= List of assets owned by NBCUniversal =

This is a list of assets owned by American mass media conglomerate NBCUniversal (which plans to be spun-off from its parent company Comcast in 2027):

== Universal Entertainment ==
=== Universal Filmed Entertainment Group ===
- Universal Pictures
  - Illumination
  - Focus Features
  - Universal Pictures Home Entertainment
    - Universal 1440 Entertainment
      - Universal Animation Studios
    - Universal Home Entertainment Productions
    - Universal Sony Pictures Home Entertainment Australia (joint venture with Sony Pictures Home Entertainment)
    - Universal Playback
- DreamWorks Animation
  - DreamWorks Classics
    - Big Idea Entertainment
    - Harvey Entertainment (in name-only unit)
  - DreamWorks Animation Television
  - DreamWorks Theatricals
  - DreamWorks New Media
  - DreamWorks Press
- United International Pictures
- Amblin Partners (minority stake; joint venture with Reliance Entertainment, Lionsgate Studios, and Damai Entertainment Holdings)
  - DreamWorks Pictures
  - Amblin Entertainment
  - Amblin Television
- Blumhouse Productions (minority stake with Jason Blum and James Wan)
  - Atomic Monster
  - BH Tilt (with Neon)
  - BlumHansonAllen Films
  - Blumhouse Books
  - Blumhouse Games
  - Blumhouse International
  - Blumhouse Television
  - Haunted Movies
- Working Title Films
  - Working Title Television
- Deloitte, Media & Entertainment, minority stake.
- Universal Pictures International Entertainment
  - NBCUniversal Entertainment Japan
  - Back Lot Music

=== Universal Television Entertainment Group ===
- Universal Television
  - EMKA, Ltd.
  - Open 4 Business Productions
  - SNL Studios (joint venture with Lorne Michaels)
- Universal Television Alternative Studio
- DreamWorks Animation Television
- Universal Global Television
  - Carnival Films (UK)
  - Heyday Television (joint venture with Heyday Films) (UK)
  - Lark Productions (Canada)
  - Universal Television Alternative Studio UK (UK)
  - NBCUniversal Formats
- NBCUniversal Global Distribution

== Universal Destinations & Experiences ==
=== Parks and Resorts ===
- Universal Studios Hollywood
- Universal Orlando Resort
- Universal Studios Japan
- Universal CityWalk
- Universal Studios Singapore
- Universal Creative
- Universal Beijing Resort
- Universal Kids Resort
- Universal United Kingdom

=== Universal Products & Experiences ===
- ShopUniversal.com

== NBCUniversal Media Group ==
- National Broadcasting Company
  - NBC Studios
- Bravo
- NBC Sports
  - NBC Olympics, LLC
  - NBCSN
  - Telemundo Deportes
- MLB Network (5.44%) joint venture with Major League Baseball and other providers
- NHL Network (15.6%) joint venture with National Hockey League
- SNY (8%) joint venture with Sterling Equities and Charter Communications
- NBCUniversal Syndication Studios
- International Media Distribution
- EMKA, Ltd.
- NBCUniversal Local
  - Affiliate Relations
  - LXTV
  - NBC Arthouse
  - NBC Owned Television Stations
    - KNBC 4 – Los Angeles
    - KNSD 39 (cable 7) – San Diego
    - KNTV 11 – San Jose/San Francisco
    - KXAS 5 – Dallas/Fort Worth
    - NBC Puerto Rico (WKAQ 2.3) – San Juan
    - WBTS 15 (cable 10) – Boston
    - WCAU 10 – Philadelphia
    - WMAQ 5 – Chicago
    - WNBC 4 – New York
    - WRC 4 – Washington
    - WTVJ 6 – Miami
    - WVIT 30 – Hartford
    - Cozi TV
    - NBC True CRMZ
  - NBC Sports Regional Networks
    - NBC Sports Bay Area (45%)
    - NBC Sports California
    - NBC Sports Boston
    - NBC Sports Philadelphia (75%)
  - Telemundo Station Group
    - TeleXitos
    - KASA 2 – Santa Fe/Albuquerque
      - Rebroadcasters KUPT 2, KUPT 16 and KRTN 39
    - KBLR 39 – Las Vegas
    - KCSO 33 – Sacramento
      - Repeaters KMMW 33 and KMUM 33
    - KDEN-TV 25 – Longmont, Colorado (Denver)
    - KHRR 40 – Tucson
    - KNSO 51 – Fresno
    - KSTS 48 – San Jose/San Francisco
    - KTAZ 39 – Phoenix
    - KTDO 48 – El Paso
    - KTMD 47 – Houston
    - KTMW 20 (cable 10) – Salt Lake City
      - Repeaters KEJT 50 and KULX 10
    - KUAN 48 (cable 20) – San Diego
    - KVDA 60 – San Antonio
    - KVEA 52 – Los Angeles
    - KXTX 39 – Dallas/Fort Worth
    - WDMR 14 – Springfield, Massachusetts
    - WKAQ 2 – Puerto Rico
    - WNEU 60 – Boston/Merrimack
    - WNJU 47 – Linden, New Jersey (New York)
    - WRDM 19 – Hartford
    - WRMD 49 – Tampa
    - WRTD 54 – Raleigh
    - WSCV 51 – Miami
    - WSNS 44 – Chicago
    - WTMO 31 – Orlando
    - WWDT 43 – Fort Myers
    - WWSI 62 – Philadelphia
    - WYCN 8 – Providence
      - Translator WRIW 51
    - WZDC 44 – Washington
    - WZTD 45 – Richmond
  - Skycastle Entertainment

=== Telemundo Enterprises ===
- Telemundo
  - Noticias Telemundo
- Universo
- Telemundo Studios
  - Telemundo International Studios
  - Telemundo Streaming Studios
  - Telemundo of Puerto Rico Studios
  - Telemundo Films
  - Underground Producciones

=== NBCUniversal International Networks ===
- Universal TV
  - Universal TV (Australia)
  - Universal TV (Latin America) (operated and distributed by Ole Distribution)
  - Universal TV (Brazil) (joint venture with Globo (50%), distributed by Globo)
  - Universal TV (New Zealand)
  - Universal TV (Sub-Saharan Africa)
- Universal+ (Latin America)
  - Universal Premiere (also available in Brazil)
  - Universal Cinema
  - Universal Comedy
  - Universal Crime
  - Universal Reality (also available in Brazil)
- 13th Street
  - 13ème Rue (France)
  - Calle 13 (Spain and Portugal)
  - 13 Ulica (Poland)
- Diva
  - Diva (Romania)
  - Diva (Balkans)
- DreamWorks Channel
- E! (Europe) (licensed from Versant)
- SciFi
  - Sci Fi (Balkans) (licensed from Versant)
  - SciFi (France)
  - Sci Fi (Poland) (licensed from Versant)
  - Syfy (Portugal) (licensed from Versant)
  - Syfy (Spain) (licensed from Versant)
- Studio Universal
  - Studio Universal (Latin America) (operated and distributed by Ole Distribution)
  - Studio Universal (Brazil) (joint venture with Globo (50%), distributed by Globo)
  - Studio Universal (Philippines)
  - Studio Universal (Sub-Saharan Africa)
- Telemundo Internacional
  - Telemundo Africa

=== NBCUniversal Direct-to-Consumer and Digital Enterprises ===
- Stakes:
  - Snap Inc.
  - BuzzFeed
  - Vox Media
- Hayu
- Peacock

=== NBCUniversal News Group ===
- NBC News
  - NBCNews.com
  - NBCUniversal Archives
  - NBC News Studios
  - NBC News Channel
  - NBC News Now

== Sky Group ==
- Challenge
- Sky Arts
- Sky Atlantic
- Sky Cinema
- Sky Comedy
- Sky Crime
- Sky Documentaries
- Sky Kids
- Sky Mix
- Sky Nature
- Sky News
  - Sky News Radio
- Sky One
- Sky Sci-Fi
- Sky Sports
  - Sky Sports F1
  - Sky Sports News
  - Sky Sports Racing (Joint venture with Arena Racing Company)
- Sky Box Office
  - Sky Sports Box Office
- Sky 3D
- Sky Witness
- Movies 24
  - Movies 24+
- A&E Networks UK (A&E Television Networks (UK) Ltd/BSkyB History Ltd)
  - Blaze
  - Crime + Investigation
  - Sky History
  - Sky History2
- Paramount UK Partnership (Paramount Pictures UK/Sky Group)
  - Comedy Central
  - Comedy Central Extra
- SkyShowtime (joint venture with Showtime Networks)
- Sky Subscriber Services
- Sky In-Home Services
- Sky Home Communications
- Sports Internet Group
- British Interactive Broadcasting Holdings
- Aura Sports
- Aura Play
- Sky UK
  - Sky Ireland
  - Now (Sky)
  - Sky Broadband
  - The Cloud
  - DTV Services Ltd (Minority stake with Arqiva, BBC, ITV plc and Channel Four Television Corporation) (60% stake)
    - Freeview
  - Sky Go
  - Freesat from Sky
- Sky Italia
  - Sky Uno
  - Sky Serie
  - Sky Atlantic
  - Sky Cinema
  - Sky Crime
  - Sky Arte
  - Sky Investigation
  - Sky Sport
  - Sky TG24
  - Sky TG24 Primo Piano
  - Sky Meteo 24
  - Sky Nature
  - Vision Distribution (joint venture with Cattleya, Wildside, Lucisano Media Group, Palomar and Indiana Production)
    - Vision Distribution International
- Sky Q
- Amstrad
- Sky Studios
  - Jupiter Entertainment
  - Skybound Stories (Joint venture with Skybound Entertainment)
  - Ginx TV Ltd (Joint venture with ITV plc)
    - Ginx TV
  - Love Productions

== Former assets ==
=== Divested ===
- Studio Distribution Services (joint venture with Warner Bros. Home Entertainment) – sold to Conectiv Supply Chain Solutions on August 4, 2026.
- Sky Deutschland (Sold to RTL Group on June 1, 2026)
  - 13th Street
  - Sky One
  - Sky Replay
  - Sky Atlantic
  - Sky Cinema
  - Sky Krimi
  - Sky Sport
  - Sky Crime
  - Sky Documentaries
  - Sky Nature
  - Sky Sci-Fi (Germany)
  - Sky Showcase
  - Universal TV (Germany)
  - Sky Switzerland
- Versant (Spin off of NBCUniversal's cable network assets; completed on January 2, 2026)
  - CNBC
    - CNBC World
    - CNBC Africa
    - CNBC Asia
    - CNBC Europe
    - CNBC Arabia
    - CNBC TV18 (joint venture with Network 18)
    - CNBC Awaaz (joint venture with Network 18)
    - Nikkei CNBC (joint venture with The Nikkei and TV Tokyo)
    - Class CNBC (joint venture with Class Editori and Mediaset)
  - E!
    - E! (Europe)
    - E! (Canada)
    - E! (Latin America)
    - E! (Brazil)
  - Fandango Media (75%; joint venture with Warner Bros. Discovery)
    - Fandango
    - Fandango at Home
    - INDY Cinema Group
    - MovieTickets.com
    - Rotten Tomatoes
      - Rotten Tomatoes Movieclips
  - Golf Channel
    - GolfNow
  - MS NOW, formerly MSNBC
  - Oxygen
    - Oxygen (Canada)
  - SportsEngine
  - Syfy
  - USA Network
    - USA Sports
    - USA Network (Canada)
    - USA Network (Latin America/Brazil) (joint venture with Canais Globo (50%), distributed by Canais Globo)
    - USA Network (Brazil)
- A&E Networks (15.8%, with The Walt Disney Company and Hearst)
  - A&E
  - Crime & Investigation Network
  - FYI (formerly The Biography Channel)
  - The History Network
    - History en Español
    - Military History Channel
  - Lifetime
    - LMN (formerly Lifetime Movie Network)
    - LRW (formerly Lifetime Real Women)
- Bad Wolf Ltd (minority stake, with Access Entertainment and HBO), sold to Sony Pictures Television
- TV One: 50% joint venture with Radio One, which acquired NBCU's stake in 2015
- The Weather Company – with private equity firms Bain Capital and The Blackstone Group: Originally a parent company of The Weather Channel. In January 2016, it was acquired by IBM.
- The Weather Channel – with private equity firms Bain Capital and The Blackstone Group: sold to Entertainment Studios.
- Pearl Studio (formerly known as Oriental DreamWorks) (45%, with China Media Capital, Shanghai Media Group and Shanghai Alliance Investment): NBCUniversal sold its stake in the studio in 2018 to CMC for restructuring and possibly problems with Chinese antitrust investigation.
- AwesomenessTV – sold to Paramount Global (now Paramount Skydance)
- Craftsy (formerly Bluprint): now owned by TN Marketing
- Euronews (25%) – Comcast sold its stake to other stakeholders
- NECN, Sold remaining assets to Charter's Specturm News Division in 2026
- NBC Sports Washington
  - NBC Sports Washington+
- SBS CNBC: sold to SBS Media Holdings in 2021
- ShopNBC
- Sky News Arabia (50%) – sold its stake to Abu Dhabi Media Investment Corporation (Government of the United Arab Emirates) in 2026
- Sundance Channel
- TV One (50% joint venture with Radio One)
- Hulu (33.3%)
  - Hulu Documentary Films

=== Dormant or shuttered ===
==== NBCUniversal ====
- Showmax (30%, joint venture with MultiChoice (70%), latter of which is owned by Canal+ S.A.) - Shut down and replaced by Canal+
- Anime Selects
- AZN Television: TV channel focused on Asian and Asian-American culture; formerly known as International Channel from its foundation in 1996 to 2005; shut down in 2008
- Bullwinkle Studios (50%, joint venture with Jay Ward Productions): Dissolved February 2022 following transfer of Jay Ward Productions library to WildBrain; NBCUniversal retains rights to all Bullwinkle Studios-era co-productions.
- Chiller
  - Chiller Films
- Chocolate Media
- Cloo
- Comcast/Charter Sports Southeast (with Charter Communications), shut down due to the loss of SEC rights to ESPN's SEC Network
- The Comcast Network
- Comcast Sports Southwest
- Esquire Network
- DreamWorks Animation Home Entertainment - folded into Universal Pictures Home Entertainment
- DailyCandy
- iVillage
- Seeso
- Shift
- Chapman Entertainment: acquired by DreamWorks Animation in 2013
- FilmDistrict: folded into Focus Features in 2014
  - High Top Releasing
- Focus World
- Fearnet (with Lions Gate Entertainment and Sony Pictures Entertainment)
- G4 (88% with Dish Network): first incarnation was closed down on December 31, 2014; meanwhile, second incarnation of the channel which operated by sister company Comcast Spectacor was closed down on November 18, 2022.
- Lucky Giant (United Kingdom)
- Matchbox Pictures (Australia) - shuttered in February 2026
- MountainWest Sports Network (controlling stake)
- NBC Sports Chicago (20%)
- NBC Sports Gold – Shut down; content moved to Peacock
- NBC Sports Northwest
- NBC Sports Radio
- NBC Universal Digital Studio - shuttered on July 1, 2011.
- NBC Weather Plus
- NewSport
- Olympic Channel
- Pacific Data Images
- Peacock Productions
  - TOMORROW
- PictureBox Films
- SportsChannel
- Station Venture Holdings (79.62% with LIN Media)
- Style Network (Australia)
- Television Without Pity: ceased its operations on May 31, 2014; relaunched under Tribune Media in 2016 later closed in 2017
- Tony Ayres Productions (Australia)
- Trio
- Universal Gaming and Digital Platforms - folded into Universal Brand Development (now Universal Products & Experiences)
- Universal Kids - shut down on March 6, 2025
- Universal Parks & Resorts Merchandise Group – merged into Universal Brand Development (now Universal Products & Experiences)
- Universal Sports Network (8% with InterMedia Partners)
- Universal Studios Partnership – merged into Universal Consumer Products Group in May 2009
- Wilshire Studios, reality studios, formerly E! Studio
- MCA TV
  - MTE
- Gramercy Pictures
- Universal Eight
- Universal TV UK & Ireland
- Universal Channel (Asia)
- Universal Channel Greece
- Universal Channel Japan
- Universal Channel Poland
- Universal Channel Turkey
- USA Home Entertainment
- 13th Street Australia
- Diva TV
- Diva (Asia)
- Diva Universal Bulgaria
- Diva Universal Italia
- Diva Universal Russia
- E! (Asia)
- E! Australia & New Zealand
- KidsCo (51% with Corus Entertainment)
- Hallmark Channel International
- Qubo (with Ion Media Networks, Scholastic Entertainment, Classic Media and Corus Entertainment): A children's programming block launched on September 9, 2006. NBC and Telemundo discontinued their Qubo blocks in 2012 after Comcast acquired NBCUniversal. Following the acquisition of Ion Media by the E. W. Scripps Company on January 7, 2021, the Qubo Channel ceased operations on February 28, 2021.
- Premium Movie Partnership (with Sony Pictures Entertainment, CBS Corporation, News Corporation and Liberty Global)
  - Showtime Australian movie channels
  - Showcase
  - Showtime Greats
- Steel
- TV1 General Entertainment Partnership (with Sony Pictures Television and CBS Studios International)
  - TV1
  - SF
- Wet 'n Wild Orlando: closed on December 31, 2016 and replaced by Volcano Bay.

==== Sky ====
- Bravo
- Bravo 2
- Channel One
- Sky Living Loves
- Sky Max
- Sky Real Lives
- Sky Replay
- Sky Scottish
- Sky Showcase
- Sky Soap
- Sky Vision: Folded into NBCUniversal Global Distribution
- Trouble

== See also ==
- Lists of corporate assets
- List of libraries owned by Comcast
