= Syfy (Netherlands) =

Syfy Universal
- Country: Netherlands
- Broadcast area: Netherlands; Belgium
- Network: NBCUniversal International Networks

Programming
- Picture format: 576i (16:9 SDTV); 1080i (HDTV)

Ownership
- Owner: NBCUniversal
- Sister channels: 13th Street Universal; CNBC Europe; DreamWorks Channel; E! Euronews; Sky News

History
- Launched: 1 October 1996; 29 years ago (as Sci-Fi Channel); 30 May 2007; 18 years ago (re-launch)
- Closed: 1 July 2016; 9 years ago
- Former names: Sci-Fi Channel (1996-1998, 2007-2010)

Links
- Website: www.syfy.nl

Syfy was a Dutch-language pay television channel service specialising in science fiction, fantasy, and horror shows and movies. The channel launched in 2007 as a sister channel to the US Sci Fi Channel, with a similar programming line-up. Syfy operated as a channel service of Universal Networks International, a division of NBCUniversal.

Sci-Fi Channel had previously been available in Benelux in the 1990s. Failing to attract audiences, the channel withdrew from the Benelux and Scandinavia at the end of 1998, focusing on their UK service instead.

An HD-simulcast started through UPC Netherlands on 1 May 2013.

It officially ceased broadcasting on 1 July 2016.

== Programming ==
=== Final Programming ===
- Dark Matter
- Haven
- The Librarians
- Warehouse 13

=== Final Programming ===
- Angel
- Battlestar Galactica
- Dark Angel
- Destination Truth
- Doctor Who (Series 7)
- Eureka
- Firefly
- Flash Gordon
- Painkiller Jane
- Paranormal Witness
- Primeval
- Primeval: New World
- Raines
- Roswell
- Sanctuary
- Sliders
- Star Trek
- Star Trek: Enterprise
- Star Trek: The Next Generation
- Stargate Atlantis
- Stargate Universe
- The X-Files
- Tin Man
- Torchwood
- Tremors
