= Syfy (international) =

International television channel variants of Syfy

- Syfy’s current logo used since 2017
- Network: NBCUniversal International Networks

Programming
- Picture format: 1080i HDTV (downscaled to 16:9 576i for the SDTV feed)

Ownership
- Owner: NBCUniversal International Networks (Note: Branding licensed from Versant until 1 October 2026.)
- Sister channels: Bravo; DreamWorks Channel; Universal TV

History
- Closed: 1 October 2026 (international)
- Replaced by: SciFi (international)
- Former names: Sci-Fi Channel

Links
- Website: Official website

Channel logo, 2010—2017

Syfy, in some countries named Sci Fi and stylized as SYFY, is a pay channel brand owned and operated by NBCUniversal International Networks that broadcasts in-house and acquired science fiction, fantasy, horror, supernatural and paranormal programming. Originally named the "Sci-Fi Channel" and first launched in the United States on September 24, 1992, it expanded to the United Kingdom 3 years later, followed by the Netherlands and Belgium a year after that, i.e. 1996.

The name Syfy was officially adopted on July 7, 2009, and most were renamed Syfy Universal during the early 2010s. Sci Fi Channels in Poland, Serbia, Slovenia and future Sci Fi Channels in Greece, Malta and the now defunct Sci Fi Channel in Romania, became Sci Fi Universal due to syfy having a profane meaning in Polish. In 2017, the channel got rebranded and the Universal suffix was already dropped.

== Global Syfy or Sci Fi channels ==
Channel	Country or region	Launch date
Syfy	United States	1992

=== Former channels ===
Channel	Country or region	Launch year	Shutdown year
Syfy (UK & Ireland)	United Kingdom and Ireland	1 October 1995	26 July 2022 (Channel rebrands as Sky Sci-Fi)
Syfy (Germany)	Germany and Switzerland	1 September 2003	27 January 2026 (channel rebrands as Sky Sci-Fi)
Syfy (France)	France	2 December 2005	17 March 2026 (channel rebrands as SciFi)
Syfy (Spain)	Spain and Andorra	1 June 2006	1 October 2026 (channel rebrands as SciFi)
Sci Fi (Poland)	Poland	1 December 2007	1 October 2026 (channel rebrands as SciFi)
Syfy (Portugal)	Portugal	6 December 2008	1 October 2026 (channel rebrands as SciFi)
Sci Fi (Balkans)	Serbia, Slovenia, Bosnia and Herzegovina, Croatia, and Montenegro	1 October 2009	1 October 2026 (channel rebrands as SciFi)
Syfy (Netherlands)	Netherlands and Belgium	1 October 1996 – 1998 as Sci-Fi Channel, re-launched on 30 March 2007	1 July 2016
SF (Australia) (part ownership)	Australia	1 December 2006	31 December 2013, replaced by Syfy in 2014
Syfy (Latin America)	Latin America	1995 (block on USA Network)	November 2001 (block on USA Network)
Syfy (Latin America)	Latin America	1 April 2007	1 October 2023 (replaced by USA Network (second iteration))
Syfy (Italy) (as a block on Steel)	Italy	19 January 2008	1 January 2013
Sci Fi (Japan)	Japan	1 April 2008	31 March 2010
Sci Fi Universal (Romania)	Romania	18 April 2008	31 December 2011
Syfy (Russia)	Russia	30 May 2008	28 February 2013
Syfy (Asia)	Asia	1 July 2008	1 July 2017
Syfy (Australia) (wholly owned)	Australia	1 January 2014, replaced SF	31 December 2019 (replaced by Fox Sci-Fi)
Syfy (MENA)	Middle East and North Africa	6 July 2016	2019

== See also ==
- CTV Sci-Fi Channel, a Canadian television channel that shows most of Sci-Fi Channel/Syfy's programming
