= Scifi (disambiguation) =

Scifi is short for science fiction, a genre of speculative fiction, typically dealing with imaginative concepts such as advanced science and technology, spaceflight, time travel, and extraterrestrial life.

Scifi, Sci-fi, SciFi, Sci Fi or Syfy may also refer to:

== Film ==
- Sci-Fi (G.I. Joe), character from G.I. Joe: A Real American Hero
- Science fiction film, a genre

== Music ==
- Sci-Fi (album), a recording by Christian McBride
- "Sci-Fi", a 2022 song by Kanye West from Donda 2

== Television ==
=== Television channels ===
- AXN Sci Fi, a European movie channel
- MTV3 Scifi, a defunct Finnish television channel
- Sci Fi Universal (Poland), a TV channel
- Syfy (UK and Ireland), a TV channel
- Syfy, an American TV channel
- Syfy Universal, a family of TV stations
  - Syfy Universal (France), a TV channel
  - Syfy Universal (Germany), a TV channel

=== Other ===
- Sci-Fi Friday Night, a science fiction programming block on Iowa Public Television
