= Diva (TV network) =

Woman-based entertainment channel

Diva, formerly Diva Universal, is a woman-based entertainment channel owned by Universal Networks International.

== Diva Universal channels around the world ==
Channel	Launch year	Shutdown year
Diva Universal (Russian TV channel)	17 September 2010	1° January 2016
Diva Universal (Bulgarian TV channel)	17 September 2010	1° January 2016
Diva (Asian TV channel)	19 September 2010	31 December 2019
Diva (Romanian TV channel)	3 October 2010	
Diva Universal (Italian TV channel)	1° April 2011	30 June 2015
Diva (Balkan TV channel)	1° September 2016	

== See also ==
- Syfy Universal
- 13th Street Universal
- Universal Channel
- Studio Universal
- Diva TV
- Hallmark Channel (International)
- Hallmark Channel
