= Universal Channel (Poland) =

Defunct poland television channel

- Country: Poland
- Broadcast area: Poland
- Headquarters: Warsaw, Poland

Programming
- Languages: Polish; English
- Picture format: 576i (16:9 SDTV); 1080i (HDTV)

Ownership
- Owner: NBCUniversal
- Sister channels: 13 Ulica; E! Entertainment; Sci Fi

History
- Launched: 1 December 2007; 17 years ago
- Closed: 1 January 2018; 7 years ago

Universal Channel was a Polish pay-tv-channel owned by NBCUniversal. It launched on 1 December 2007 and It was available on the platforms n, Cyfra+, Cyfrowy Polsat and cable networks UPC Polska, Multimedia Polska, Digital Vectra and Toya. After the merger of n and CYFRA+ to Nc+ the channel was removed from the offer of the new platform. On 12 March 2014 it returned to nc+ again.

NBCUniversal announced on 6 June 2017 that the channel's closure on 1 September 2017 is "part of a strategic rebalance of its channels’ portfolio in the market". However, the channel continued broadcasting until 1 January 2018.

== Programming ==
=== Final Programming ===
- Aquarius
- Blue Bloods
- Castle
- The Last Cop
- Rookie Blue

=== Former Programming ===
- A Touch of Frost
- Air Force One Is Down
- Arrow
- Band of Brothers
- Baywatch
- Californication
- Columbo
- CSI: Miami
- Dexter
- Diagnosis Murder
- The Disappearance
- The District
- Futurama
- The Good Wife
- Hawaii Five-0
- JAG
- John from Cincinnati
- Law & Order
- The Librarians
- The Mentalist
- Monk
- Psych
- Ring of Fire
- Royal Pains
- Scandal
- Sleeper Cell
- The Sopranos
- Stalker
- Stargate
- Stargate Universe
- Walker, Texas Ranger
