= Versant =

American media company, spin-off from Comcast

Versant Media Group, Inc.

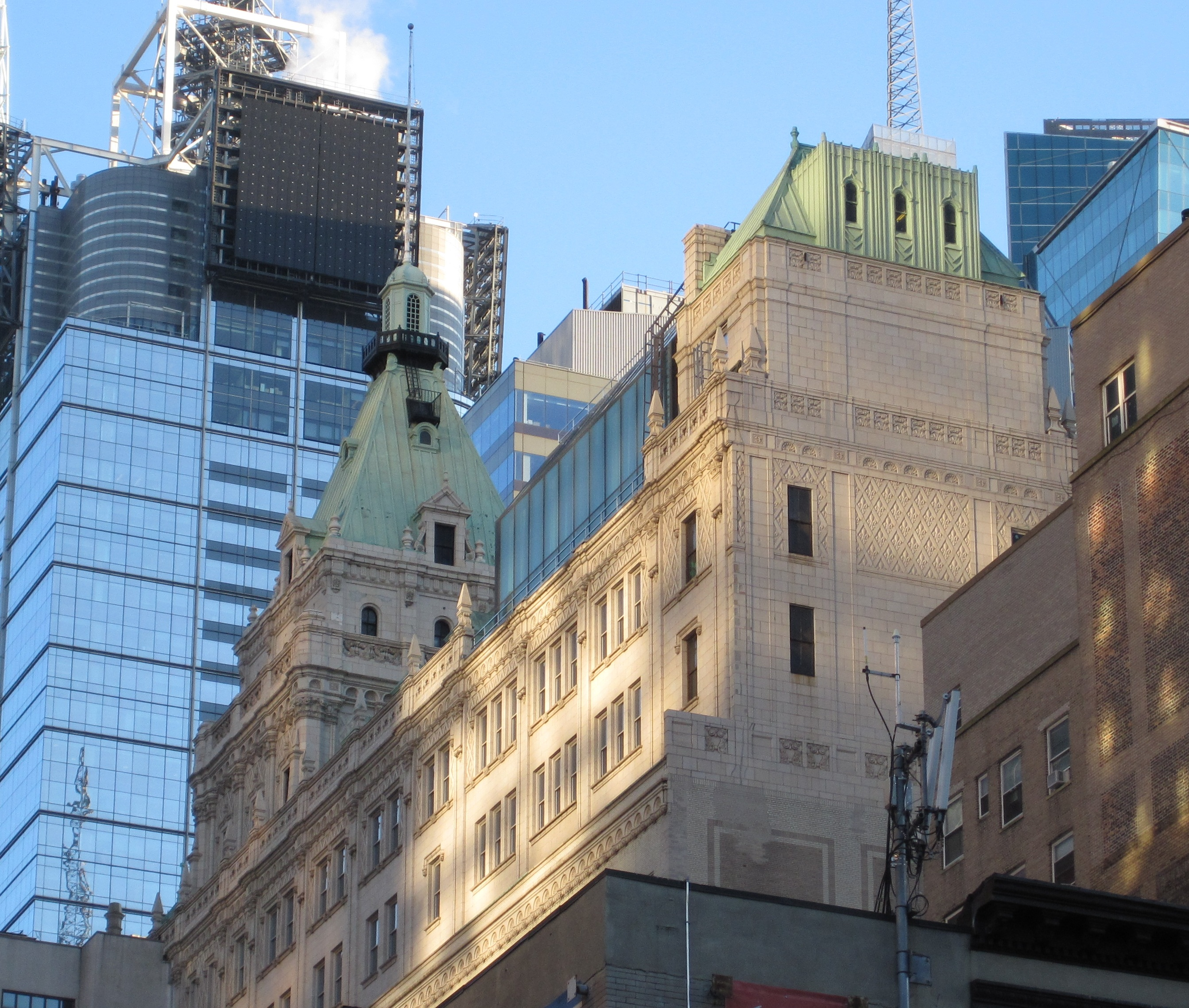
- Headquarters at 229 West 43rd Street in New York City
- Trade name: Versant
- Type: Public
- Traded as: Nasdaq: VSNT (Class A); S&P 600 component
- Industry: Media
- Predecessor: NBCUniversal Cable Entertainment
- Founded: January 2, 2026; 10 months ago
- Headquarters: New York City, United States
- Area served: United States; Worldwide (via CNBC)
- Key people: Mark Lazarus (CEO); David Novak (chairman)
- Brands: USA Network; Syfy; Oxygen; E!; MS NOW; CNBC; Golf Channel
- Services: Broadcasting; Television
- Revenue: ▼US$6.69 billion (2025)
- Net income: ▼US$930 million (2025)
- Owner: Brian L. Roberts (1% equity interest, 33% voting power)
- Number of employees: 4,418 (2026)
- Subsidiaries: Fandango Media (75%); StockStory; Free TV Networks
- Website: versantmedia.com

Versant Media Group, Inc., doing business as Versant (/ˈvɜːrsənt/), is an American multinational mass media and technology company. Versant is headquartered at 229 West 43rd Street in Midtown Manhattan in New York City, while technical operations and master control for its networks are housed at CNBC's world headquarters in Englewood Cliffs, New Jersey.

The company began operations on January 2, 2026, as a spin-off from Comcast subsidiary NBCUniversal, consisting of cable networks such as USA Network, MS NOW, CNBC, Golf Channel, E!, Syfy, and Oxygen, their related digital properties such as GolfNow, Fandango, and Rotten Tomatoes, as well as digital multicast television network operator Free TV Networks. Versant shares were distributed to Comcast shareholders, with Brian L. Roberts continuing to hold a 33% voting share.

== History ==
=== Announcement and lead-up ===
On October 31, 2024, Comcast president Michael J. Cavanagh disclosed that the company was exploring a plan to spin off NBCUniversal's cable networks. He explained that "like many of our peers in media, we're experiencing the effects of the transition of our video businesses and have been studying the best path forward for these assets," and that such a spin-off would "position them to take advantage of opportunities in the media landscape and create value for our shareholders."

On November 20, 2024, Comcast announced its intent to spin off most of NBCUniversal's cable networks and selected digital properties into a new publicly traded company controlled by Comcast shareholders. The spin-off aimed to separate the linear cable television networks and digital properties from NBCUniversal's flagship content film production, distribution, and financing (Universal Filmed Entertainment Group); television production (Universal Studio Group); broadcasting (NBC and Telemundo); streaming (Peacock, Universal+ and Hayu); and themed entertainment (Universal Destinations & Experiences) businesses, while providing them with the ability to make their own further investments and acquisitions. The spin-off would include assets such as USA Network, MSNBC, CNBC, Golf Channel, and E!, among others, as well as digital properties such as a 75% stake in Fandango Media, and SportsEngine (a technology platform for youth sports organizations, then part of NBC Sports Digital). Bravo and Universal Kids were excluded from the spin-off, with the former remaining under NBCUniversal due to it being a major provider of original content for Peacock, while the latter closed on March 6, 2025. The international linear networks were also kept.

Initially referred to under the interim name "SpinCo," on May 6, 2025, it was announced that the company would be called Versant, a name developed by Catchword. Lazarus explained that Versant will be treated as a holding company and "house of brands"; a larger focus will be placed upon its individual properties rather than Versant being a public-facing brand, and decisions on digital operations (such as streaming) will be left to each network. Versant is also aiming to invest in non-media businesses that have synergies with its media properties, with Lazarus citing existing examples such as Golf Channel's ownership of the reservations platform GolfNow.

Questions were raised over how the spin-off would impact the synergies between Versant and the legacy divisions being retained by NBCUniversal, such as whether they would still be able to leverage resources from the NBC News and NBC Sports divisions or use the NBC name. Under its new president, Rebecca Kutler, MSNBC began expanding its newsgathering resources and Washington staff so it could operate with autonomy from NBC News. Versant will lease space for CNBC and MSNBC's Washington, D.C., bureaus at NBC's existing facility at 400 North Capitol. NBCUniversal will also provide advertising sales for Versant channels for two years after the completion of the spin-off, and the Versant channels participated in NBCUniversal's 2026 upfronts.

NBC Sports president Rick Cordella stated that the division would "fulfill every obligation" it currently has with the Versant channels; in August 2025, NBCUniversal and Versant renewed their rights to United States Golf Association (USGA) championships from 2027 through 2032, with USA Network and Golf Channel continuing to serve as the cable television home of the events post-split. It was the first major media rights deal negotiated by Comcast to incorporate Versant. Alongside its continued sublicensing of NBC Sports programming, it was later announced that Versant would also establish a separate USA Sports division to encompass Golf Channel and sports broadcasts on USA Network.

In June 2025, Versant leased space at 229 West 43rd Street in Times Square to serve as its headquarters. While the building was originally intended to be an interim location, Lazarus later announced that the company would lease additional space and make it its permanent headquarters, citing the building's central location and "operational effectiveness".

In October 2025, both CNBC and MSNBC began the process of formally separating themselves from NBC News. As part of the spin-off, the two channels and Golf Channel also underwent rebrandings to remove the overt use of NBC trademarks, such as the NBC name or the peacock logo, with MSNBC renamed "MS NOW" (a backronym of "My Source [for] News, Opinion, [and the] World"; a name that contained "MS", reflecting the network's original part-owner Microsoft, was chosen to maintain brand awareness, as "MS" had also been used as a shorthand name for the channel), CNBC adopted a new wordmark logo (it was able to keep "NBC" in its name due to the name originally being an initialism for "Consumer News and Business Channel", although Versant was still required to obtain a trademark license from NBCUniversal), and Golf Channel reinstated a version of its original logo.

In November 2025, AccuWeather announced an agreement to provide weather data and coverage for MS NOW and CNBC, including weather forecasts during their respective morning shows, Morning Joe and Squawk Box, and collaborating on coverage of weather events. The same month, Versant officially launched USA Sports to cover programming across its channels, including USA Network and Golf Channel. As not all of NBC Sports properties would be shared with USA Sports or vice versa, NBCUniversal would relaunch NBCSN in order to maintain a linear television outlet for NBC Sports (with the channel primarily simulcasting Peacock's sports properties).

=== Post spin-off (2026–present) ===
On December 3, 2025, the divestment was approved by Comcast's board of directors; Comcast began to distribute Versant shares to its shareholders beginning from mid-December, and the distribution was completed on January 2, 2026. The new company officially began trading on the Nasdaq on January 5, 2026. On December 4, 2025, Versant also announced that it would acquire digital multicast television network and FAST operator Free TV Networks (in a transaction that was completed on January 14, 2026), as well as Indy Cinema Group—a provider of cloud computing services for the cinema industry (via Fandango Media). Free TV Networks founder Jonathan Katz joined the company as an executive to continue overseeing the networks.

Later in December 2025, Versant renewed Golf Channel's content partnership with golfer Rory McIlroy (which primarily focuses on its GolfPass streaming service), and announced a new joint venture with the golfer known as Firethorn Productions, which will "produce original content and experiences that celebrate Rory's world and the modern golf lifestyle".

In January 2026, Versant announced its first content library sale, placing streaming rights to E!'s Keeping Up with the Kardashians with Hulu. While Versant retained on-air rights to 280 original episodes and a variety of specials and spinoffs, the deal unified streaming access to the first 14 years of Kardashian reality shows with the more recent The Kardashians series that has streamed on Hulu since 2022.

In April 2026, Versant announced that it would acquire the AI-based financial analytics platform StockStory for an undisclosed amount; it will primarily be integrated with CNBC.

Versant announced the sale of SportsEngine to PlayMetrics on May 1, 2026. On June 2, 2026, Versant invested in microdrama distributor GammaTime. On July 6, 2026, Versant announced that it would acquire the sports simulator manufacturer Full Swing for $530 million; the company will operate as part of Versant's Digital Platforms and Ventures division, and as part of the Golf Channel unit. The Full Swing acquisition was completed on August 3, 2026.

In July 2026, Versant entered early talks into acquiring film discussion platform Letterboxd, alongside Sony, Netflix and Paramount.

Versant reported second-quarter revenue of $1.644 billion and net income of $211 million on August 6, 2026. Revenue from Versant’s Platforms segment increased 9.3% year over year in the second quarter of 2026, excluding the impact of SportsEngine.

In October 2026, when asked if Comcast's plans to also spin off NBCUniversal could lead to a potential deal to merge Versant's assets back into the company, Lazarus stated that "our cash flow is really strong, and I think we will find our path, whether it's on our own transformation or alongside someone else, but no, that wouldn’t be the plan to necessarily go back to them." He also ruled out interest in acquiring Skydance cable networks if any of them were to be put up for sale, explaining that "buying more cable assets on a large scale would prolong our life but not necessarily make our life better because we still have the secular decline."

== Assets ==
=== Current ===
Versant houses the following assets:

- Television Media
  - CNBC
    - CNBC-e (joint-venture with İlbak Holding)
    - CNBC Asia
    - CNBC Europe
    - CNBC World
    - CNBC TV18 (joint-venture with Network18 Group)
      - CNBC Awaaz
      - CNBC Bajar
      - CNBC Bangles
      - CNBC Tamilan
    - Class CNBC (joint-venture with Class Editori and Mediaset) (Versant owns 20%)
    - Nikkei CNBC (joint-venture with Nikkei, Inc. and TV Tokyo)
  - E!
    - E! (Latin America) (majority joint-venture with Ole Communications, distributed by Ole Distribution and licensed to NBCUniversal International Networks)
  - Free TV Networks
    - 365BLK
    - Busted
    - Defy (joint-venture with A+E Global Media)
    - Outlaw
  - Golf Channel
    - GolfPass
    - Firethorn Productions
  - MS NOW
    - MS NOW Films
  - Oxygen
  - Syfy
  - USA Network
    - USA Sports
    - USA Network Latin America (majority joint-venture with Ole Communications, distributed by Ole Distribution and licensed to NBCUniversal International Networks)
    - USA Network Brazil (joint-venture with Globo (50%); distributed by Globo and licensed to NBCUniversal International Networks)
- Digital Platforms and Ventures
  - GolfNow
  - Fandango Media (75%; with Skydance)
    - Fandango (movie ticketing platform)
    - Fandango (streaming service)
    - INDY Cinema Group
    - MovieTickets.com
    - Rotten Tomatoes
      - Rotten Tomatoes Movieclips
  - Full Swing
  - StockStory

=== Licensed ===
- CNBC
  - CNBC Africa (licensed to Africa Business News)
  - CNBC Arabia (licensed to Middle East Business News)
  - CNBC Indonesia (licensed to Trans Media)
  - Times Brasil (licensed to Times Brasil/Attention Economics)
- E!
  - E! (Canada) (licensed to Bell Media)
  - E! (Europe) (licensed to NBCUniversal International Networks)
- Oxygen
  - Oxygen (Canada) (licensed to Bell Media)
- Syfy
- USA Network
  - USA Network (Canada) (licensed to Bell Media)

=== Former ===
==== Divested ====
- SportsEngine (sold to PlayMetrics on May 1, 2026)

==== Defunct ====
- Sci Fi (Balkans) (licensed to NBCUniversal International Networks)
- SciFi (France) (licensed to NBCUniversal International Networks)
- Syfy (Spain) (licensed to NBCUniversal International Networks)
- Sci Fi (Poland) (licensed to NBCUniversal International Networks)
- Syfy (Portugal) (licensed to NBCUniversal International Networks)

== See also ==
- List of conglomerates
- People Incorporated
