= Sci Fi Universal (Romania) =

Romanian variant of the Syfy television channel

Sci Fi Universal Romania
- Country: Romania
- Broadcast area: Romania

Programming
- Languages: English; Romanian (subtitles only)

Ownership
- Owner: NBCUniversal International Networks (NBCUniversal)

History
- Launched: April 18, 2008
- Closed: December 31, 2011

Links
- Website: Official website

Sci Fi Universal was a Romanian cable and satellite television channel and the local variant of Syfy under its former name "Sci Fi Channel" that was operated by NBCUniversal International Networks from 18 April 2008 until the end of 2011.

== Programming ==
- Angel
- Battlestar Galactica
- Buffy the Vampire Slayer
- Charmed
- Dark Angel
- Eureka
- Fact or Faked: Paranormal Files
- Firefly
- Flash Gordon
- Futurama
- Ghost Hunters
- Haven
- Legend of the Seeker
- Quantum Leap
- Stargate Atlantis
- Stargate SG-1
- Stargate Universe
- Star Trek
- Star Trek: Enterprise
- Warehouse 13
- Who Wants to Be a Superhero?
- The X-Files
