= E! (Europe) =

European television channel

- Broadcast area: Europe
- Headquarters: Amsterdam, Netherlands

Programming
- Picture format: 1080i HDTV (downscaled to 16:9 576i for the SDTV feed)

Ownership
- Owner: NBCUniversal International Networks (Note: Branding licensed from Versant.)
- Sister channels: DreamWorks Channel; Syfy; Universal TV

History
- Launched: 2 December 2002
- Closed: 31 August 2012; 14 years ago (Italy); 1 May 2015; 11 years ago (Russia); 31 December 2022; 3 years ago (Germany); 31 December 2023; 2 years ago (UK and Ireland); 6 October 2025; 13 months ago (Africa); 17 March 2026; 7 months ago (France)

Links
- Website: Official Website

Availability

Streaming media
- Ziggo GO (Netherlands): ZiggoGO TV

E! is a European pay television channel, operated by E! Entertainment Europe B.V. and owned by NBCUniversal International Networks. It features entertainment-related programming, reality television and Hollywood gossip and news. E! currently has an audience reach of 600 million homes internationally.

== History ==
=== E! in Europe before 2004 ===
E! Entertainment Television was founded by Larry Namer and Alan Mruvka in the United States.

The network launched on 31 July 1987 as Movietime, a service that aired movie trailers, entertainment news, event and awards coverage, and interviews as an early example of a national barker channel. Three years later, in June 1990, Movietime was renamed E! Entertainment Television to emphasise its widening coverage of the celebrity–industrial complex, contemporary film, television and music, daily Hollywood gossip, and fashion.

In the Fall of 1999, Zone Vision launched E! Entertainment in Poland, under a licensing agreement on the Polish digital platform Wizja TV, with Zone's Studio Company providing localized content. The channel was shut down by 2002.

=== E! enters Europe ===
In 2002, E! launched in Europe with its headquarters situated in Amsterdam in the Netherlands. One of the first countries E! broadcast in was Germany, where it telecast daily. In the Summer of 2006, E! began localizing in France, Italy, and the UK.

At the end of 2011, E! launched in HD in Eastern Europe. Followed by a launch in the UK and in Ireland on 8 October 2012, Germany on 30 April 2013 and other European countries.

=== Universal Channel and E!’s Closure in Russia ===
On 30 April 2015, E! was closed during technical problems, along with Universal Channel.

=== E! in the UK and Ireland ===
E! in the UK and Ireland was a lifestyle channel with E! America's content like E! News and Live from the Red Carpet dropped. The promos/trailers for E! have also ceased. The channel closed on 31 December 2023.

E! has localised versions of the same channel, including:

- E! (Balkans)
- E! (Benelux)
- E! (Greece and Cyprus)
- E! (Israel)
- E! (Poland)
- E! (Portugal)
- E! (Romania)
- E! (Scandinavia)
- E! (Serbia)
- E! (Slovenia)

Closed channels:

- E! (Africa) (became Bravo (Africa) on 6 October 2025)
- E! (France) (became Bravo (France) on 17 March 2026)
- E! (Germany)
- E! (Italy)
- E! (Russia)
- E! (UK and Ireland)

== See also ==
- E!
- E! (Australia and New Zealand)
- E! (Asian TV channel)
- E! (Canadian TV channel)
