= SciFi (France) =

- Country: France
- Broadcast area: France; Belgium; Luxembourg; Monaco; Switzerland; Madagascar

Programming
- Language: French
- Picture format: 576i (16:9 SDTV); 1080i (HDTV)

Ownership
- Owner: NBCUniversal International Networks
- Sister channels: 13ème Rue; Bravo; DreamWorks Channel

History
- Launched: 2 December 2005; 20 years ago
- Former names: Syfy

Links
- Website: https://scifi.fr

SciFi is a French-speaking 24-hour science fiction entertainment channel. It was formerly named Syfy which was based on the US version of the same name, until 2026. The channel launched on 2 December 2005, under the branding of SciFi. It became the fourth "Sci Fi Channel" alongside channels in the United States, UK and Germany. The channel was rebranded Syfy on 5 January 2010, as part of global rebrand. Some years later, it was changed for SYFY on 29 August 2017, as part of another global rebrand. In 17 March 2026, their name again was reverted back to SciFi.

== History ==
Sci-Fi started as a programming block on 13ème Rue in 1999. Sci-Fi launched as a channel in France on 2 December 2005.

Sci-fi was rebranded as Syfy on 5 January 2010, with the suffix Universal in the beginning. The channel rebranding coincides with NBC Universal Global Networks rebranding campaign which initially started in the US in July 2009.

Syfy created the pop-up channel La Chaîne de la Fin du Monde to mark the announcement of the End of the World scheduled on 21 December 2012, it broadcast on Canalsat from 21 November to December 2012.

Syfy was reverted back to its original name SciFi on 17 March 2026.

== Distribution ==
- France: Syfy is widely available in France on SFR, Bouygues Telecom, Free, Molotov TV and Amazon Prime Video.
- Belgium: Syfy is available in option on Proximus Pickx, VOO and Telenet.
- Switzerland: Syfy is available on Swisscom (Blue TV XL) and Sunrise (Premium Plus).

Syfy initially was exclusive to CanalSat in France (except on cable networks). In December 2016, SFR announced that it had signed an exclusivity agreement with NBCUniversal and resumed exclusive distribution of Syfy, 13ème Rue and E!, available until then in the Canal offers (which are as well distributed via the ISP boxes such as Freebox of Free).

In March 2017, the channels have arrived at SFR. They were removed of Canal on 26 September 2017, in Metropolitan France. In Overseas France and Africa, Canal+ still distribute the channels, while SFR also added them where it operated.

With the end of the exclusivity on SFR, the Universal+ service along with Syfy, 13ème Rue, E!, and the new DreamWorks channel, were launched on 17 November 2022 on SFR, and in December on Bouygues Telecom and Prime Video Channels. Universal+ along with Syfy was also added to Molotov TV on 18 October 2023, and Free in January 2024. However, the channels did not return on Canal+ in mainland France.

== See also ==
- List of Syfy (France) programs
