= Diva Universal (Italian TV channel) =

Italian TV channel

- Country: Italy
- Broadcast area: Italy

Programming
- Language: Italian

Ownership
- Owner: Universal Networks International Italy

History
- Launched: 1 September 1997
- Closed: 30 June 2015
- Former names: Hallmark Channel (1997-2011)

Links
- Website: http://www.divauniversal.it/

Diva Universal was an Italian television channel owned by Universal Networks International Italia, and broadcast on SKY Italia Channel 128 (Entertainment package).

It launched on 1 September 1997 as Hallmark Channel. On 31 March 2011, the channel was rebranded to Diva Universal.

Hallmark Channel logo used 2004-2011

Hallmark Channel was owned by the privately backed Sparrowhawk Media Group, until late 2007 when the company was bought by NBCUniversal.

On 30 June 2015, Diva Universal Italy was permanently discontinued at midnight.

== See also ==
- Hallmark Channel
- Hallmark Channel (international)
- Universal TV (British and Irish TV channel)
