= 13ème Rue =

French television channel

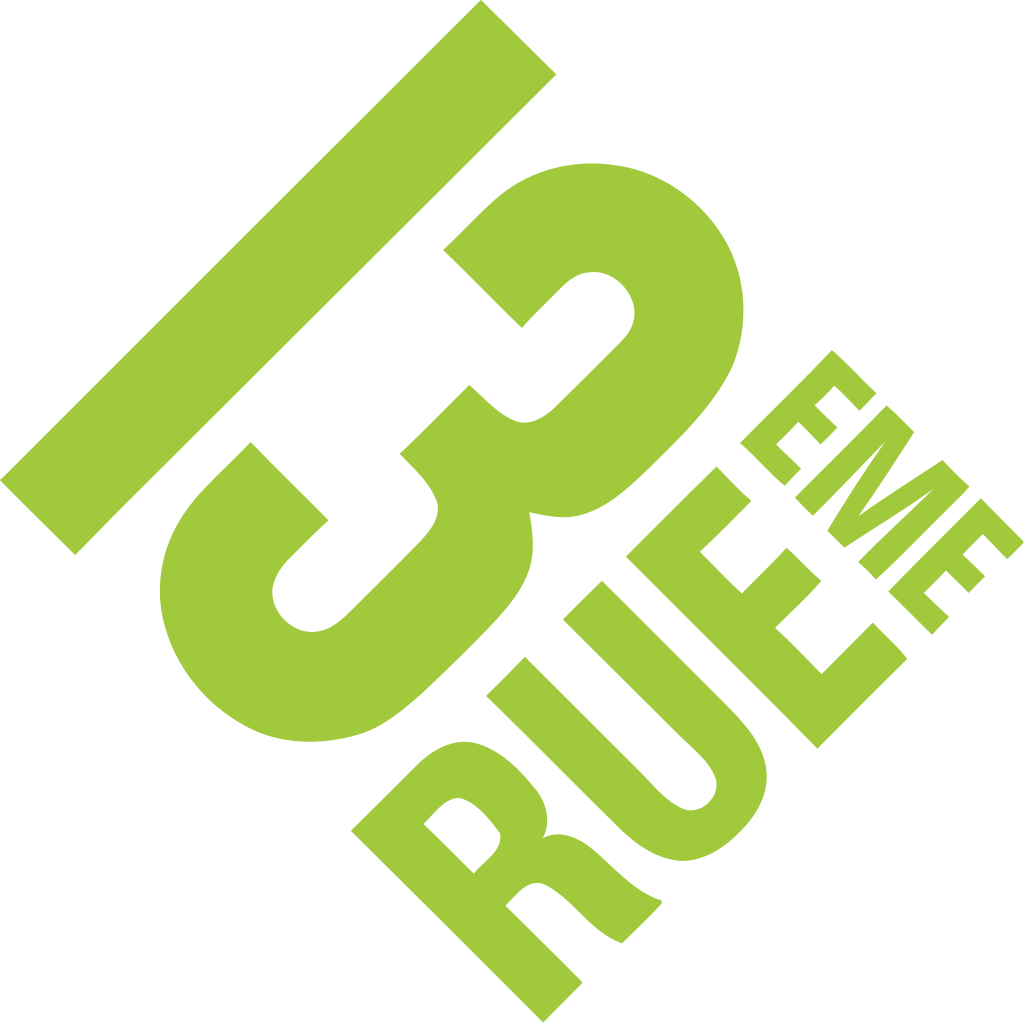
- Country: France
- Broadcast area: France; Belgium; Switzerland; Luxembourg; Monaco
- Headquarters: Saint-Cloud, France

Programming
- Language: French
- Picture format: 16:9 576i (SDTV); 16:9 1080i (HDTV)

Ownership
- Owner: Universal Networks International (NBCUniversal)
- Sister channels: SciFi; Bravo; DreamWorks Channel

History
- Launched: 13 November 1997; 28 years ago
- Former names: 13^{ème} Rue Universal (2010-2012)

Links
- Website: www.13emerue.fr

13^{ème} Rue is a television channel specialising in action and suspense shows and movies. It is owned by NBCUniversal.

== History ==
Logo in early 2010s (the mention "Universal" was removed)

The channel began broadcasting on 13 November 1997 at 20:13 on Canal Satellite channel 13, after several days of broadcasting hook-ups. After a welcome trailer, the broadcast of the first episodes of two unpublished series New York Undercover and American Gothic began.

On November 12, 2007, 13e Rue HD began broadcasting. Since 2 September 2013, 13e Rue broadcasts in 16:9.

== Programming ==
- 100 Code
- Against the Wall
- Aquarius
- Bates Motel
- Battlestar Galactica
- Burn Notice
- Candice Renoir
- Cape Town
- Catching Milat
- Chance
- Cherif
- Chicago Fire
- Chicago Justice
- CHiPS
- Chosen
- Condor
- Coyote
- Cracked
- Departure
- Dig
- EZ Streets
- F/X: The Series
- Fairly Legal
- Ghost Stories
- Hannibal
- High Incident
- In Plain Sight
- Joan of Arcadia
- Karen Sisco
- Kindred: The Embraced
- Knight Rider
- Kojak
- L.A. Heat
- Law & Order
- Law & Order: Criminal Intent
- Law & Order: Los Angeles
- Law & Order: Special Victims Unit
- Law & Order: Organized Crime
- Law & Order: Trial by Jury
- Law & Order True Crime
- Life
- Lucifer
- Magnum
- Mammon
- Mannix
- Miami Vice
- Midnight Caller
- Midsomer Murders
- Missing
- Modus
- Motive
- Mr. & Mrs. Smith
- My Life is Murder
- Mysterious Ways
- Navarro
- New York Undercover
- Night Visions
- Perversions of Science
- Played
- Players
- Psych
- Quantum Leap
- ReGenesis
- Rookie Blue
- She Spies
- Shoot the Messenger
- Shooter
- Sliders
- State of Affairs
- Tales from the Crypt
- Tequila and Bonetti
- The A-Team
- The Burning Zone
- The Bridge
- The Chicago Code
- The Fall
- The Family
- The Hunger
- The Listener
- The Outer Limits
- The Shield
- The Twilight Zone
- Third Watch
- True Justice
- Veronica Mars
- Wicked City
- Zen

== Audience share ==
In 2011, 13ème Rue receives 0.6% audience on cable, ADSL and satellite. 13ème Rue is the first cable and satellite channel in terms of viewing time per viewer and is maintained in the five most watched channels, all targets combined.

On Canalsat, 13ème Rue achieved 1.1% audience.

== Distribution ==
In December 2016, SFR announced that it had signed an exclusivity agreement with NBCUniversal and resumed exclusive distribution of Syfy and 13ème Rue, available exclusively on Canal offers.

Since then, the channels have arrived at SFR, and were removed of Canal on 26 September 2017. Canal+ replaced 13e Rue by Polar+.
