= Telemundo Africa =

African subscription television channel

- Country: South Africa
- Broadcast area: Sub-Saharan Africa

Programming
- Languages: English; Portuguese
- Picture format: 16:9

Ownership
- Owner: NBCUniversal International Networks
- Sister channels: Universal Channel; Bravo; Studio Universal

History
- Launched: 12 August 2013

Links
- Website: www.facebook.com/TelemundoAfrica/

Telemundo Africa is an African cable television channel broadcast on 12 August 2013 by DStv in more than 48 countries in sub-Saharan Africa. Owned by NBCUniversal International Networks, the channel programming is dedicated to the Spanish-language telenovelas produced by Telemundo Television Studios. The channel is available in English and Portuguese.

== Overview ==
Telemundo Africa is only available for the African market, with Spanish-language programming dubbing in English for the countries of South Africa and Sub-Saharan Africa, and in Portuguese for Angola and Mozambique. The dubbing in Portuguese is done in Miami by the studios The Kitchen and Universal Cinergia Dubbing. The dubbing in English is done in South Africa by MultiChoice. When the channel began its broadcasts in August 2013, it began to show the telenovelas Aurora, Rosa diamante, Mi corazón insiste en Lola Volcán and La casa de al lado.

From April 2021, the channel started airing all their shows 7 days a week similar to other channels such as Zee World, Star Life and Novela Magic.

In June 2023, Nurses was removed from the channel amidst the final season due to Cameroon and Uganda implementation of anti-gay laws requiring TV broadcasters not to promote homosexual content or risk having their licence revoked or face possible jail time.
