= Telemundo of Puerto Rico Studios =

Subsidiary

Coordinates: 18°25′20″N 66°4′10″W

Telemundo of Puerto Rico Studios, LLC is a division of NBCUniversal Telemundo Enterprises, a division of NBCUniversal, a subsidiary of Comcast. It develops original programming in Spanish for station WKAQ-TV in Puerto Rico.

== History ==
On June 21, 2007, Telemundo of Puerto Rico Studios was created to produce TV programming for viewing in Puerto Rico and internationally. On September 4, 2007, the first project began with a 35-episode season of Decisiones.

Decisiones is a successful TV unitary show. Telemundo has produced more than 500 episodes in 3 countries: Mexico, U.S. (Miami, Florida), and Colombia. Decisiones began on the island, with support of the production team of Decisiones at Telemundo Network. The studios are located at the Telemundo of Puerto Rico facilities in Hato Rey, San Juan, Puerto Rico.

On November 7, 2007, the production hosted a Gala Premier at the Centro de Bellas Artes Luis A Ferré in San Juan. The event was attended by representatives from the government, press, clients, actors and the general public. The production showed clips from the first 9 episodes and the first show's first segment.

Decisiones Puerto Rico, as it was called for local distribution, began on Monday, November the 12, 2007, on Telemundo WKAQ-TV.

The studio hosted the 2023 Baloncesto Superior Nacional Femenino draft.
