= GolfNow =

Online booking platform for golf courses

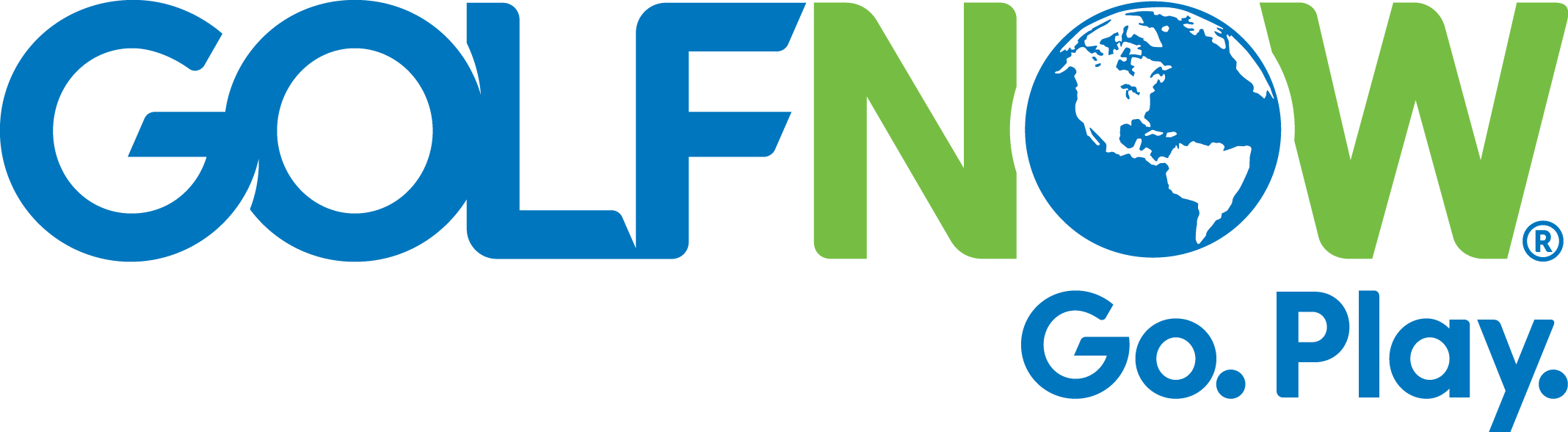
- Company type: Subsidiary
- Founded: 2001
- Headquarters: Orlando, FL
- Area served: North America; Ireland; United Kingdom
- Owner: Versant
- Industry: Golf reservation services
- Employees: 600
- Parent: USA Sports (through Golf Channel)
- Registration: Not required
- Current status: Active

GolfNow is an online booking service for tee times at golf courses. Originally established in 2001 by Cypress Golf Solutions in Scottsdale, Arizona, US, it was acquired by Comcast via its Golf Channel unit in March 2008. Since 2025, it has been owned by Versant, a former subsidiary of Comcast prior to its spin-off to their shareholders in 2026.

== History ==
The GolfNow.com domain name was initially used by Chris Ryan and Dr. Tom Giannulli, in Houston, Texas, in 1999, with the intent to build the first online golf reservation system. Under Ryan's leadership, the company went on to develop and operate the initial Golfnow.com website until 2001. Funding issues and sluggish adoption of their reservation platform in the era of dial-up modems, forced the company to pivot to a more content driven transaction model. Cypress Golf Solutions, which was founded in Scottsdale by Brett Darrow and Frank Halpin in 2001, purchased the GolfNow.com domain name. The company expanded its GolfNow brand and operations to a larger regional area over the years, and by 2006 it was operating in 17 states at over 600 golf courses.

In March 2008, Comcast, owner of Golf Channel, purchased GolfNow. The company's operations were re-located to Golf Channel's headquarters in Orlando, Florida. In the same year, the company facilitated the booking of 2.4 million rounds.

In February 2010, Golf Channel announced the acquisition of WorldGolf network of 450+ websites. This network of websites was used to further grow GolfNow's digital booking engine and travel packages worldwide.

GolfNow extended its services outside the United States in 2011 to Ireland through GolfNow.ie. In 2013, GolfNow purchased BRS, a booking service in the United Kingdom, along with Fore! Reservations, one of the largest tee time companies in the US. In 2011, GolfNow offered to acquire EZLinks, a competing company backed by the PGA Tour. GolfNow hired a former EZLinks employee. In 2012, EZLinks filed a lawsuit over software theft through the former employee.

In October 2014, GolfNow acquired Active Network's golf division. The acquisition added 1,100 courses to GolfNow's service. In 2015, GolfNow facilitated the booking of nearly 15 million rounds.

This was GolfNow's fourth acquisition in 18 months. It acquired BRS Golf, a British tee-sheet service with 750 courses and FORE! Reservations, an American counterpart with more than 2,000 golf courses. More recently, it acquired Crescent Systems, which had 300 to 400 clients.

In November 2019, GolfNow acquired EZLinks.

== Features ==
GolfNow offers access to online booking services for over 9,000 golf courses. Users can compare prices of tee times across multiple courses, read user reviews, and book their reservation.

GolfNow also offers a mobile app; the free version offers the service's core search and booking functionality, while a subscription-based premium version adds additional features for use while playing, including a scorecard, personal statistics and an "on-course GPS" function allowing access to overhead satellite maps of holes with distance measurements.

== Impact ==
The Orlando Sentinel reported that GolfNow has had a positive impact on the business of golf courses in Orlando, noting that the service helped to encourage business during previously "off-peak" parts of the day such as the early afternoon. The general manager of Orlando's Dubsdread Golf Club felt that GolfNow had helped customers discover the course among other options in the region, crediting the service for "getting our name and our prices to those golfers who normally would not drive past 15, 20 golf courses to come play golf here". The service was also credited with having attracted existing golfers to new courses, such as the Four Seasons Resort Orlando's Tranquilo, and new clientele to existing courses. Orlando was GolfNow's fifth-largest market in 2015, having generated $14.5 million in revenue from partner courses.

There are articles and reviews to the contrary: The Oaks golf course in Kentucky posted a rebuttal to GolfNow's claims of helping the sport, but more directly, the golf courses. The Hot Deals, it claims, are chased by players only wanting to pay the least no matter what, and none of that money ever gets to the golf course. It also claims that very few, if any, customers return unless they again find a Hot Deal, which in no way helps with daily operating expenses. The Oaks has ceased to do business with GolfNow.
