= Diva TV =

- Country: United Kingdom

Programming
- Picture format: 576i (SDTV 4:3)

Ownership
- Owner: Universal Networks International (NBCUniversal)
- Sister channels: Universal Channel; Syfy; CNBC Europe; Movies 24

History
- Launched: 1 October 2007
- Closed: 14 February 2012

Links
- Website: divatv.co.uk

Diva TV was a British TV channel owned by Universal Networks International, which launched on Sky in the UK and Ireland on channel 269 at midday on 1 October 2007.

It aired shows such as The Late Show With David Letterman, The Oprah Winfrey Show, The Talk and McLeod's Daughters.

On 1 November 2011 Diva TV +1 closed on Sky channel 277. The channel had previously been available on Virgin Media channel 165 until 1 April 2010.

Diva TV closed on 14 February 2012 at midnight with its most popular programmes shifted to the Style Network. The move followed NBCUniversal's acquisition by Comcast in March 2011 and affected only the UK market.

== See also ==
- Diva Universal
