= Sci Fi (Balkans) =

- Broadcast area: Serbia, Slovenia, Bosnia and Herzegovina, Croatia, and Montenegro

Ownership
- Owner: NBCUniversal International Networks

History
- Launched: 1 October 2009

Links
- Website: scifi.rs

Sci Fi was launched on 1 October 2009, in Serbia, Slovenia, Bosnia, Croatia and Montenegro, specializing in science fiction, fantasy and horror shows and movies. It is distributed via cable, Sci Fi Channel became Sci Fi Universal on 14 October 2010.

It features a similar schedule to the Polish version of Syfy with Serbian language subtitles; because the network is hubbed out of Warsaw, it also defers to the use of the former "Sci-Fi" branding due to the "Syfy" term sounding the same as the plural word for syphilis in the Polish language.

On 1 October 2026, Sci Fi was rebrand a new logo.

== Logos ==
2009–2010

2010–2017

2017–2026

== Programming ==
=== Current ===
- Bitten
- Grimm
- Killjoys
- Travelers
- Xena: Warrior Princess

=== Former ===
- Angel
- Battlestar Galactica
- Buffy the Vampire Slayer
- Charmed
- Dark Angel
- Day of the Dead
- Dead Like Me
- Destination Truth
- Eden Of The East
- Eureka
- Firefly
- Futurama
- Flash Gordon
- Grimm
- Hercules: The Legendary Journeys
- Legacies
- Legend of the Seeker
- Legends of Tomorrow
- Limetown
- Quantum Leap
- Spides
- Stargate Atlantis
- Stargate SG-1
- Stargate Universe
- Star Trek: Enterprise
- Star Trek: The Next Generation
- Travelers
- Tru Calling
- Vagrant Queen
- Warehouse 13
- Wynonna Earp
