= Calle 13 (TV channel) =

Spanish pay television channel

- Broadcast area: Spain, Andorra
- Headquarters: Madrid, Spain

Programming
- Language: Spanish
- Picture format: 576i (16:9 SDTV); 1080i (HDTV)

Ownership
- Owner: NBCUniversal

History
- Launched: 13 September 1999; 26 years ago

Links
- Website: https://www.calle13.es/

Calle 13 is a Spanish pay television channel. Owned by Universal Studios Networks Spain, Calle 13 promotes itself as a channel of suspense and action.

Calle 13 (13th Street) was launched in 1999 and its schedule is made of TV series and movies of action, suspense, terror, mystery and science fiction, both Spanish and international, classic and modern. With the birth of sister channel Sci Fi Channel in June 2006, most of the science-fiction series Calle 13 used to show were moved to the new channel.

== Programming ==
- Alfred Hitchcock Presents
- Andromeda *
- Blood Ties
- Brimstone
- Chicago P.D.
- Chuck
- Columbo
- Departure
- El Comisario
- Grimm
- Hercules: The Legendary Journeys *
- Homicide: Life on the Street
- Hudson & Rex
- Jericho
- Law & Order
- Law & Order: Criminal Intent
- Law & Order: Los Angeles
- Law & Order: Special Victims Unit
- Law & Order: Organized Crime
- Law & Order: Trial by Jury
- Law & Order True Crime
- MacGyver
- Magnum P.I.
- Monk
- Murder, She Wrote
- Mutant X
- Nip/Tuck
- Numbers
- Person of Interest
- Policías, en el corazón de la calle
- Profiler
- Psi Factor: Chronicles of the Paranormal
- Psych
- Quantum Leap
- Rizzoli & Isles
- Rookie Blue
- seaQuest DSV *
- Serial Experiments Lain
- Star Trek: Enterprise *
- Starhunter
- The 4400
- The Closer
- The Dead Zone *
- The Event
- The Equalizer
- Third Watch
- Xena: Warrior Princess *
- Witchblade *

* Now on SYFY Universal

== Sister channels ==
Syfy Universal (also known as Syfy, formerly Sci Fi Channel) is a Spanish pay television channel that was launched on 1 June 2006 and specialises in science fiction, fantasy, and horror shows and movies.

== Other versions ==
This channel is also available in:

- 13^{ème} Rue is the French version, was launched on November 13, 1997
- 13th Street is the German version
- 13th Street Universal (Benelux) is the version for the Benelux
