= Syfy (Spain) =

Spanish television channel

- Country: Spain
- Broadcast area: Spain, Andorra
- Headquarters: Madrid, Spain

Programming
- Language: Spanish
- Picture format: 576i (16:9 SDTV); 1080i (HDTV)

Ownership
- Owner: NBCUniversal International Networks
- Sister channels: Calle 13

History
- Launched: 1 June 2006; 20 years ago
- Closed: October 1, 2026
- Replaced by: SciFi

Links
- Website: www.syfy.es

Syfy (formerly Sci-Fi) is a Spanish digital satellite/cable television channel. It was launched on 1 June 2006 and specializes in science fiction, fantasy, and horror shows and movies.

Owned by Universal Networks International, it is the fifth extension of the Syfy brand. The programming consists of a mixture of U.S. Syfy first-run shows like Haven and Defiance, current shows like Beauty & the Beast and archive shows such as Smallville and Charmed, as well as science-fiction and fantasy-themed movies, reality shows and scientific divulgation programs (Universo Syfy).

The channel will rebrand as SciFi on 1 October 2026.

== Programming ==
=== Current programming ===
- The Ark
- Day of the Dead
- The Outpost
- Outlander
- Reginald The Vampire
- Scorpion
- Warehouse 13

=== Former programming ===
- The 100
- Aftermath
- Alias
- Alphas
- Andromeda
- American Gothic
- Arrow
- Babylon 5
- Battlestar Galactica
- Beauty & the Beast
- Being Human
- Bionic Woman
- Blade: The Series
- Buffy the Vampire Slayer
- Bugs
- Camelot
- The Cape
- Caprica
- Charmed
- Childhood's End
- Dark Matter
- Dark Skies
- Day Break
- The Dead Zone
- Dead Like Me
- Defiance
- Destination Truth
- Doctor Who
- Dominion
- Earth 2
- Eureka
- Fact or Faked: Paranormal Files
- The Fades
- Farscape
- Flash Gordon
- Frank Herbert's Dune
- Galactica
- Ghost Whisperer
- Godzilla: The Series
- Grimm
- Halcyon
- Haunted Collector
- Haven
- Hercules: The Legendary Journeys
- Heroes
- Heroes Reborn
- The Incredible Hulk
- The Invisible Man
- Killjoys
- Knight Rider (1982 TV series)
- Knight Rider (2008 TV series)
- Kyle XY
- Legend of the Seeker
- Legend Quest
- The Librarians
- Lois & Clark: The New Adventures of Superman
- The Magicians
- Men in Black: The Series
- Merlin
- Miracles
- Mutant X
- Mysterious Ways
- The Outer Limits
- Painkiller Jane
- Paranormal Witness
- Playr
- Primeval: New World
- Quantum Leap
- Revolution
- Riese: Kingdom Falling
- Roswell
- Sanctuary
- School Spirits
- SeaQuest DSV
- The Secret Circle
- The Sentinel
- Seven Days
- Sliders
- Smallville
- The Spooktacular New Adventures of Casper
- Star Trek: Enterprise
- Stargate Atlantis
- Stargate SG-1
- Stargate Universe
- Tremors
- Tripping the Rift
- Unnatural History
- Young Hercules
- Xena: Warrior Princess
- Witchblade

Some of these shows where formerly shown by sister channel Calle 13.
