= Diva (Romanian TV channel) =

Romanian TV channel

- Country: Romania
- Broadcast area: Romania

Programming
- Languages: Romanian; English

Ownership
- Owner: NBCUniversal International Networks

History
- Launched: 3 October 2010

Links
- Website: https://www.divaromania.tv/

Diva is a Romanian television channel owned by NBCUniversal International Networks. It launched on October 3, 2010 as Diva Universal, replacing Hallmark Channel.

== Identity and logo changes ==
On September 24, 2014, Diva Universal was renamed to Diva by eliminating "Universal" from its name. And with that, the channel switched to 16:9 broadcasting.

Starting from January 2025, Diva no longer makes seasonal idents from each month, instead only a single set of idents remain throughout the rest of the months, outside Christmas. In which for the Christmas idents from October 2024, a new package was launched as a result of that.

An HD simulcast was launched on March 25, 2025.

== Series ==
- Nashville
- Judging Amy
- Rookie Blue
- Army Wives
- The Real Housewives of Orange County
- McLeod's Daughters
- Medium
- Parenthood
- Monk
- Stalker
- Chicago Fire
- Chicago Med
- The Good Wife
- Grey's Anatomy
- Bunheads
- Good Witch
- Midsomer Murders
- The Mentalist
- Family Law
- Chesapeake Shores
- Departure
- Being Erica
- Nurse Jackie
- Haven
- Eastwick
- Hawaii Five-0
- Gilmore Girls
- Castle
- The Librarians
- Sullivan's Crossing
- Nurses
- HeartBeat
- Professor T.
- Hudson & Rex
- Magnum P.I.
- The Detail
- Mercy
- Desperate Housewives
- Almost Paradise
- Emma Fielding Mysteries
- Murders in...
- Coroner
- Signed, Sealed, Delivered
- Law & Order
- El rostro de la venganza
- Agatha Christie's Marple
- Hooten The Lady
- Private Eyes
- No Brother of Mine
- Una Maid en Manhatten
- Cold Case
- Elementary
