= 13th Street (TV channel) =

Television station

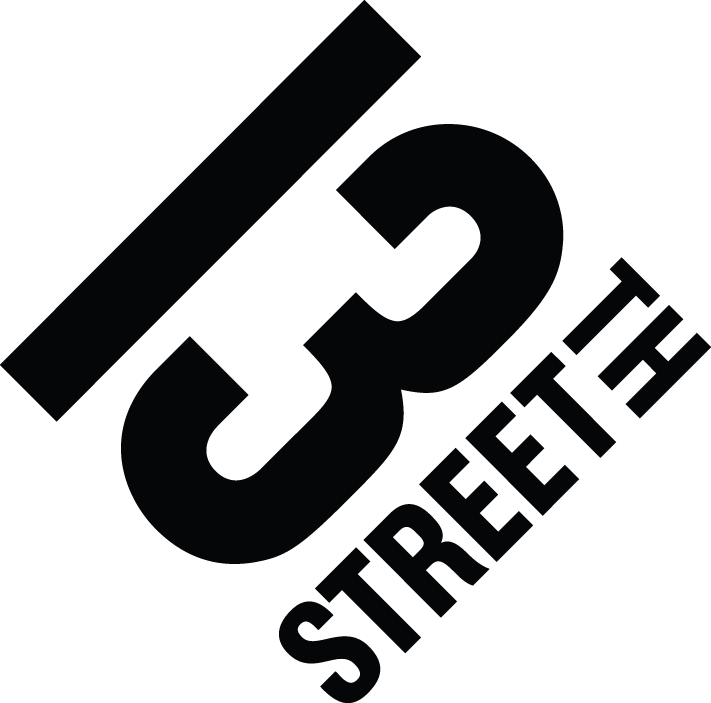
- Network: NBCUniversal International Networks

Programming
- Picture format: 1080i HDTV (downscaled to 16:9 480i/576i for the SDTV feeds)

Ownership
- Owner: NBCUniversal
- Sister channels: DreamWorks Channel; Bravo; Universal TV; Sky News

History
- Launched: 30 November 1997; 28 years ago (France); 1 May 1998; 28 years ago (Germany); 13 September 1999; 27 years ago (Spain); 5 January 2005; 21 years ago (Russia); 30 May 2007; 19 years ago (Netherlands); 15 November 2009; 17 years ago (Australia); 13 September 2010; 16 years ago (Poland)
- Closed: 1 July 2016; 10 years ago (Netherlands & Flanders); 31 December 2019; 6 years ago (Australia)

Channel logo introduced in 2010

13th Street (France: 13^{ème} Rue, Spain: Calle 13 and Poland: 13 Ulica) is a television channel specializing in action, suspense and police procedural programs and movies, mainly from the Universal Pictures and Television libraries. It is owned by NBCUniversal and was inaugurated in France in 1997, quickly adding local versions across Europe and Australia.

The channel changed its name to 13th Street Universal in the early 2010s like ’’Syfy Universal’’. The additional "Universal" notation was dropped after and the channel had a rebranding in March 2017.

== 13th Street around the world ==
Channel	Country or region	Launch date
13ème Rue	France	November 30, 1997
13th Street (German TV channel)	Germany	May 1, 1998
Calle 13	Spain	September 13, 1999
13 Ulica	Poland	September 13, 2010

=== Former channels ===
In Latin America, Calle 13/Rua 13 was a programming block of USA Network from 13 July 1999 to November 2001.

Channel	Country or region	Launch date	Shutdown date
13th Street (Dutch TV channel)	Netherlands	September 6, 2007	July 1, 2016
13th Street (Australian TV channel)	Australia	November 15, 2009	December 31, 2019

== See also ==
- 13th Street Australia
- 13^{ème} Rue France, Switzerland, and Wallonia
- 13th Street Germany, Austria, and Switzerland
- Calle 13 Spain
