= Studio Universal =

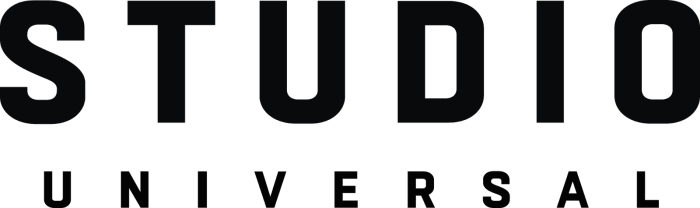
- Country: Italy, Latin America, South Africa, Philippines, Indonesia
- Broadcast area: Italy, Latin America, South Africa, Philippines, Indonesia

Programming
- Languages: Italian, Spanish, Portuguese, English
- Picture format: 1080i HDTV

Ownership
- Owner: Universal Networks International (NBCUniversal)

History
- Launched: May 21, 1998 (Italy); February 1, 2010 (Latin America); September 30, 2011 (South Africa); September 18, 2023 (Philippines); March 26, 2025 (Indonesia)
- Replaced: Hallmark Channel (Latin America)
- Closed: January 1, 2019 (Italy)

Availability

Terrestrial
- Premium Gallery: LCN 338
- Cignal (Philippines): Channel 56 (SD); Channel 216 (HD)
- SatLite (Philippines): Channel 74

Streaming media
- Blast TV (Philippines): Watch Live (requires user membership)

Studio Universal is a specialty television channel focused on films. It is owned by Universal Networks International. Programming is based on films (mainly from Universal Pictures) and related programs with interviews, insights, short films and frequent themed nights or seasons on which are shown films centred on one genre, director or actor. The Studio Universal brand was chosen as a core channel of Universal Networks International. The channel was launched on February 1, 2010 in Latin America replacing Hallmark Channel.

== History ==
Former logo in Italy used from 1998 to 2013

Former logo used from 2010 to 2015

The channel was originally launched in Italy in 1998 on satellite television platform Stream TV and continued on SKY Italia from July 31, 2003 to June 1, 2008. A carriage dispute led the channel to be replaced by MGM Channel. The Studio Universal channel resumed on May 8, 2009, on Premium Gallery, part of pay-television platform Mediaset Premium.

It was announced in November, 2008 by Steve Patscheck, director of "Universal Networks Latin America", that the channel would be launched in Latin America on February 1, 2010 replacing The Hallmark Channel in the region. Studio Universal launched in September 30, 2011 in South Africa and sub-Saharan Africa.

Studio Universal was discontinued in Italy on 31 December 2018.

In 2023, Studio Universal made its first launch in Southeast Asia thru TAP DMV's over-the-top streaming service Blast TV in the Philippines.

In 2025, it became available on Cablelink, SkyCable & SkyTV.

On August 15, 2026, Studio Universal has available on Cignal & SatLite.

== See also ==
- Studio Universal (Latin America)
