= NBCUniversal International Networks =

International networks division of NBCUniversal

NBCUniversal International Networks & Direct-to-Consumer
- Formerly: NBC Universal Global Networks (2005–2009); Universal Networks International (2009–2015)
- Type: Division
- Industry: Broadcasting
- Founded: January 5, 2005; 21 years ago
- Headquarters: New York City, New York, US; London, England, UK
- Parent: NBCUniversal (Comcast)
- Website: nbcuniversal.com

NBCUniversal International Networks & Direct-to-Consumer, formerly NBC Universal Global Networks, Universal Networks International and NBCUniversal International Networks, is the international networks division of NBCUniversal, a subsidiary of Comcast. (Until 2027)

== History ==
When NBCUniversal was formed in 2004, it owned many entertainment television channels in Europe and Latin America. These were mostly a few international versions of the Sci Fi Channel, three action and suspense series channels in Europe, the Italian Studio Universal channel and the Latin American version of the USA Network.

In 2007, NBC Universal acquired Sparrowhawk Media Group, which at the time was a British private equity-backed media company managing a collection of digital television television channels, and integrated it into NBC Universal Global Networks. The purchase more than doubled the number of international channels in NBC Universal's portfolio. Sparrowhawk's crown jewel was an international network of drama channels available on most continents under the Hallmark Channel brand, but Diva TV, Movies 24 and KidsCo channels were also available.

Altogether, the division broadcast about 70 different channels by 2009. On 5 October 2009, it was announced that the venture would be renamed Universal Networks International and focus its attention on five channel brands, all with "Universal" in their name:

- Universal Channel
- 13th Street Universal
- Syfy Universal
- Diva Universal
- Studio Universal

The overhaul started in late 2009 and progressed during 2010. Most of the international Sci Fi channels were rebranded as Syfy. The Hallmark Channel brand was also phased out in most markets during 2010. Typically, it was replaced by the Universal Channel brand in markets where that brand was not available before. In many markets where Universal Channel was already present, Hallmark Channel was replaced by Diva Universal with one each replaced by Studio Universal or 13th Street Universal.

Following the acquisition of NBC Universal by Comcast NBCUniversal and Comcast in 2011, the following channels were also operated and distributed by NBCUniversal:

- E! Entertainment Television (now simply E!) (now owned by Versant)
- Style Network (later Esquire Network) (shut down)
- The Golf Channel (now owned by Versant)

The DreamWorks Channel was placed under the NBCU International executive vice president, lifestyle and kids, Duccio Donati in August 2017. This paired the channel with E! international channels and NBCU lifestyle channel content. On 1 January 2018, NBCUniversal International Networks took over HBO Asia's role with DreamWorks Channel in Southeast Asia.

Following NBCU parent company, Comcast acquisition of Sky Group in 2018, NBCUniversal International Networks took over the sales, marketing and distribution rights to Sky News outside UK and Ireland from Fox Networks Group, which was later dissolved in 2021.

== Channels ==
=== Americas ===
- Canada
  - Bravo (operated by Rogers Sports & Media under a brand licensing agreement)
- Latin America (minority-owned by Ole Communications, networks distributed by Ole Distribution)
  - Universal TV
  - Universal+
    - Universal Premiere (also available in Brazil)
    - Universal Cinema
    - Universal Comedy
    - Universal Crime
    - Universal Reality (also available in Brazil)
  - Studio Universal
  - Telemundo Internacional
  - DreamWorks Channel (also available in Brazil)
- NBCUniversal International Networks & Direct-to-Consumer Brasil (joint-venture with Globo, which also handles distribution)
    - Universal TV Brazil
    - Universal+ Brazil
    - Studio Universal Brazil
    - DreamWorks Channel Brazil

=== Asia-Pacific ===
- South Korea
  - DreamWorks Channel
- Southeast Asia
  - DreamWorks Channel
  - Studio Universal (Philippines only)
  - Telemundo (licensed to Viva Communications)
- Australia and New Zealand
  - 7Bravo (Australia only)
  - Bravo (New Zealand only)
  - Universal TV
    - Australia
    - New Zealand
  - DreamWorks Channel (Australia only)

=== EMEA ===
- 13th Street

==== France ====
In December 2016, SFR got an exclusivity agreement with NBCUniversal for channels and films (on Altice Studio)

- 13ème Rue Universal
- Bravo
- DreamWorks Channel
- SciFi

==== Netherlands ====
- DreamWorks Channel

==== Poland ====
- 13 Ulica
- Sci Fi

==== Portugal ====
- SciFi

==== Romania ====
- Diva

==== Serbia, Montenegro, Albania, Bosnia and Herzegovina, Croatia, Slovenia, and Macedonia ====
- Diva Adria
- Sci Fi

==== Spain ====
- Calle 13
- DreamWorks Channel
- SciFi

==== Middle East and North Africa ====
- DreamWorks Channel

==== Sub-Saharan Africa ====
- Bravo
- Universal TV Africa
- Studio Universal Africa
- Telemundo Africa
- DreamWorks Channel

== High-definition ==
On the January 26, 2009, Sci Fi became the first of the NBC Universal Global Network channels to begin broadcasting in high definition within the UK. It would provide a simulcast of the Sci Fi Channel exclusively on Sky+HD channel 214 and air UK HD premieres such as Eli Stone and Flash Gordon.

== Video on demand ==
NBCUniversal International introduced Hayu in March 2016 in the United Kingdom. The subscription video on demand service offers reality programs such as Keeping Up with the Kardashians and The Real Housewives.
