= Sci Fi (Poland) =

Polish variant of the Sci Fi channel, now Syfy

- Broadcast area: Poland

Programming
- Picture format: 576i (16:9 SDTV)

Ownership
- Owner: NBCUniversal International Networks

History
- Launched: 1 December 2007; 18 years ago

Links
- Website: Official website

Sci Fi is a Polish cable and satellite television channel and the local variant of the Sci Fi channel (now Syfy) owned and operated by the international networks division of NBCUniversal and launched on 1 December 2007. Unlike its sister international variants, the Polish channel has maintained use of the brand spelled "Sci Fi" because in Polish the word syfy is the plural of the colloquial term syf (clipped from syfilis) 'syphilis'.

On 1 October 2026, Sci Fi was rebrand a new logo.

== Programming ==
=== Current ===
- Bitten
- Grimm
- Killjoys
- Travelers
- Xena: Warrior Princess

=== Former ===
- Angel
- Battlestar Galactica
- Anuman
- Buffy the Vampire Slayer
- Charmed
- Dark Angel
- Day of the Dead
- Dead Like Me
- Destination Truth
- Eden of the East
- Eureka
- Firefly
- Futurama
- Flash Gordon
- Ghost Hunters International
- Grimm
- Hercules: The Legendary Journeys
- Legacies
- Legend of the Seeker
- Legends of Tomorrow
- Limetown
- Quantum Leap
- Sliders
- Spides
- Stargate Atlantis
- Stargate SG-1
- Stargate Universe
- Star Trek: Enterprise
- Star Trek: The Next Generation
- Travelers
- Tru Calling
- Vagrant Queen
- Warehouse 13
- Wynonna Earp
- The X-Files
- Sci Fi Universal original programmes

== Logos ==
2007–2010

2010–2017

2017–2026
