= DreamWorks Channel =

International children's television channel

- Broadcast area: Worldwide (except North America)

Programming
- Languages: List: Arabic; Cantonese; Dutch; English; Filipino; French; Indonesian; Korean; Malay; Mandarin; Portuguese; Spanish; Thai; Vietnamese
- Picture format: 1080i HDTV
- Timeshift service: DreamWorks Channel +1

Ownership
- Owner: NBCUniversal (Comcast)
- Parent: NBCUniversal International Networks
- Sister channels: List: 13th Street; Bravo; Sky News; Studio Universal; Universal TV

History
- Launched: 1 August 2015; 11 years ago

Links
- Website: Official website

DreamWorks Channel, commonly known as DreamWorks, is a pay television network owned and operated by the international networks division of NBCUniversal, a subsidiary of Comcast. First launched in Southeast Asia on 1 August 2015, it expanded to the rest of Asia as well as Europe, Africa and Oceania. Its programming is mainly sourced from DreamWorks Animation.

In the United States, DreamWorks Animation's shows were instead aired on Universal Kids, which launched on 9 September 2017 as a rebranding of Sprout before shutting down on 6 March 2025, with the streaming rights to DreamWorks Animation's programming in the country provided by NBCUniversal's streaming service Peacock in the United States as well as on Netflix internationally.

== History ==
=== As a standalone television channel ===
DreamWorks Animation announced plans to launch its own television channel on 9 December 2014 starting in Asia, with plans to launch in over 19 countries starting in the second half of 2015. Singapore-based broadcaster HBO Asia provided marketing, sales and technical services for the channel in Southeast Asia. The studio's first foray into television channel operations in any part of the world was represented with the launch of its first dedicated channel on 1 August 2015 in Thailand through a joint venture through with CTH.

A Middle East and North Africa feed of the channel launched on 1 August 2016 in partnership with the beIN Channels Network.

The channel was placed under now-former NBCU International executive vice president of their children's and lifestyle programming, Duccio Donati, in August 2017, following the NBCU's owner Comcast's acquisition of DreamWorks Animation. This paired the channel with E! international channels and NBCU Lifestyle Channel content. On 1 January 2018, NBCUniversal International Networks replaced HBO Asia's role with DreamWorks Channel in Southeast Asia.

The channel launched on KPN in the Netherlands on 23 July 2019.

The channel launched as a one-month pop-up channel in Australia through Foxtel on channel 700 throughout June 2020 and returned as a regular 24/7 network the following year.

The Sub-Saharan African feed of the channel originally launched on StarTimes on 3 August 2020, but closed on 17 February 2022 and was replaced by Nickelodeon on StarTimes ON in July 2022. MultiChoice and NBCUIN jointly announced on 8 March 2022 that the channel would launch on DStv a week later on 18 March. On its launch, the channel broadcast on the channel number slot previously held by Disney XD which was shut down on 1 October 2020 and supplement eToonz alongside PBS Kids. The Sub-Saharan African channel was available on the DStv Compact, DStv Compact Plus and DStv Premium subscription packages in South Africa and on the DStv Premium and DStv Compact Plus subscription packages in the rest of Africa, although the channel was made available on the lower-tiered DStv Family and DStv Access subscription packages until 18 April to promote The Bad Guys. From 27 June to 15 July 2022, the channel was made available on DStv Family alongside Disney Channel to promote Illumination's Minions: The Rise of Gru. It is currently available on the DStv Compact Plus and DStv Premium packages, with the channel only available on DStv's other packages; DStv Compact, DStv Family and DStv Access, during Christmas and summer time.

The Philippines feed of the channel launched on Cignal on 11 September 2021, with aired productions dubbed in the Filipino language. It was also launched on SkyCable in mid-November that same year, though SkyCable uses its original English feed instead. Like the Sub-Saharan African DStv channel feed, it replaced the country's channel feed of Disney Channel, which shut down on the same date as the Southeast Asian Disney Channel feeds on 1 October. SkyCable removed the channel on 1 September 2024 due to contract expiration.

A Latin American feed launched on 1 April 2022.

The Malaysia feed of the channel launched on Astro on 15 January 2023 initially on Channel 622 (HD) until 31 January 2023. In its first two weeks, the channel broadcast as a free trial period for customers before becoming part of an Astro's children's package starting on 1 February 2023. On the same day, the channel moved to Channel 612 (HD) as a replacement for TA-DAA! which closed on 1 February 2023.

=== Universal+ launch with DreamWorks ===
The channel and Universal+ launched in Spain with two television providers Movistar+ and Orange on 21 February 2021.

The Indian feed of the channel was launched in English via Jio TV on 25 November 2021. (Note: The network primarily distributes NBCUniversal film and television content, with every dedicated content hub for each of their brands under Universal+ after the launch in Spain.)

DreamWorks Channel's programming are currently available to stream on Universal+ which launched as an on-demand service in South Africa on DStv Catch Up and DStv Stream on 14 October 2022.

The channel was launched along with Universal+ in France on SFR on 17 November 2022 on Prime Video Channels on 6 December 2022 and on Bouygues Telecom on 8 December 2022.

== Programming ==
The content on the channel mainly consists of productions from the libraries of DreamWorks Animation Television and DreamWorks Classics including some of DreamWorks Animation's content originally produced for Netflix; films and specials from DreamWorks Animation, Illumination and sometimes from third parties only broadcasts in the international versions.

=== Programming blocks ===
- DreamWorks Jr. - This block is composed of shows targeting preschool-age children every morning and is compared to various preschool blocks in the United States, including Paramount Skydance's Nick Jr. and Channel 5's Milkshake! in the UK, The Walt Disney Company's Disney Jr. and Warner Bros. Discovery's Cartoonito. Programs currently seen in this block include Guess with Jess and Raa Raa the Noisy Lion

== Versions ==
Market	Type	Launch date	Universal+ included? (Note: Unless otherwise indicated, "Yes" means Universal+ programming has been available since February 22, 2021, and the launch of DreamWorks Channel in the indicated country/territory.)	source
Thailand (in English)	Channel	1 August 2015	No	
Thailand (in Thai)	Channel	1 September 2015	No	
Malaysia	Channel	10 September 2015	No	
Indonesia	Channel	2 March 2016	No	
Singapore	Channel	3 March 2016	No	
Hong Kong (in English and Cantonese)	Channel	1 April 2016	No	
Macau (in English and Cantonese)	Channel	1 April 2016	No	
South Korea	Channel	3 May 2016	No	
South Korea	SVOD	3 May 2016	No	
Middle East & North Africa	Channel	1 August 2016	No	
Maldives	Channel	2 August 2018	No	
Netherlands	Channel	23 July 2019	No	
Vietnam	Channel	1 April 2020	No	
Australia (pop-up channel)	Channel	1 June 2020	No	
Sub-Saharan Africa (original)	Channel	3 August 2020	No	
Spain	Channel	22 February 2021	Yes	
Hong Kong (in Mandarin)	Channel	17 June 2021	No	
Macau (in Mandarin)	Channel	17 June 2021	No	
Australia (24/7 channel)	Channel	1 July 2021	No	
Philippines (in Filipino)	Channel	11 September 2021	No	
Thailand (TrueVisions relaunch)	Channel	1 October 2021	No	
Philippines (in English)	Channel	15 November 2021	No	
India	Channel	25 November 2021	Yes	
Sub-Saharan Africa (relaunch)	Channel	18 March 2022	Yes	
Latin America	Channel	1 April 2022	Yes	
France	Channel	21 November 2022	Yes	

== See also ==
- Peacock, through which some Universal Kids contents are hosted
- Universal Kids, this network's defunct American equivalent, formerly Sprout.
- Sky Kids, this network's British equivalent, owned by Comcast's Sky Group.
