= NBCUniversal =

Global media and entertainment conglomerate

NBCUniversal Media, LLC
- Logo used since January 5, 2026, after Comcast spun-off most of NBCUniversal's cable assets. Wordmark designed by Wolff Olins used since 2011.

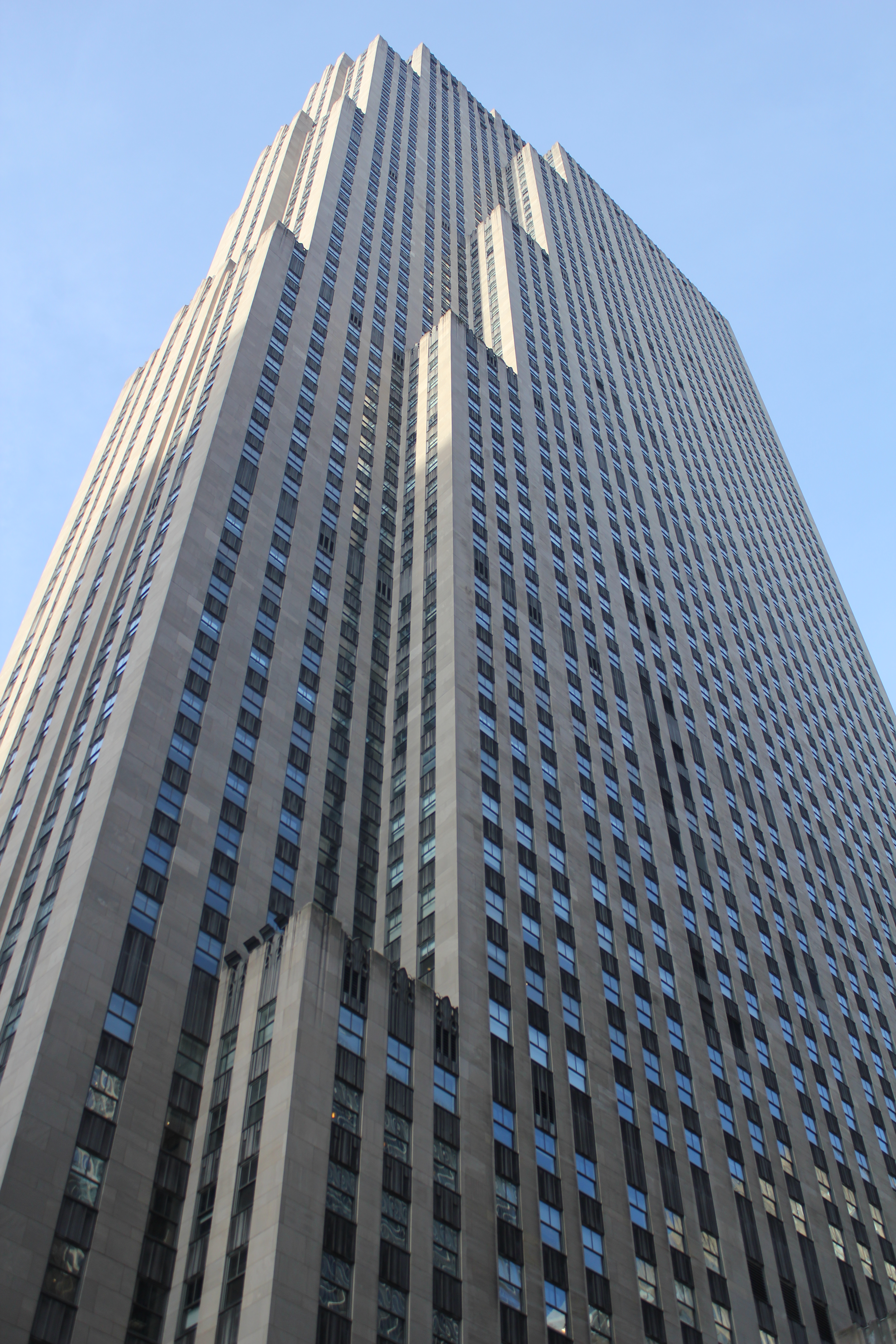
- NBCUniversal's headquarters at the Comcast Building (former RCA Building at 30 Rockefeller Plaza) in New York City
- Trade name: NBCUniversal
- Formerly: National Broadcasting Company, Inc. (1926–2004); NBC Universal, Inc. (2004–2011)
- Type: Subsidiary
- Industry: Media; Entertainment
- Predecessors: Vivendi Universal Entertainment
- Founded: May 11, 2004; 22 years ago
- Headquarters: Comcast Building, New York City, United States
- Area served: Worldwide
- Key people: Mike Cavanagh (Co-CEO, Comcast); Adam Miller (COO); Christopher Halpin (CFO)
- Products: Amusement parks; Films; Music; Television shows; Video games; Web portals
- Brands: List: Amblin Partners (20%); Bravo; Cozi TV; DreamWorks Animation; Focus Features; Hayu; Illumination; NBC; NBC News; NBC News Now; Olympics on NBC; NBC Sports; NBCSN; Peacock; Sky; Telemundo; Universal Beijing; Universal Animation Studios; Universal Global Television; Universal Orlando; Universal Pictures; Universal Pictures Home Entertainment; Universal Studios Hollywood; Universal Studios Japan; Universal Studios Singapore; Universal Television; Universal Television Alternative Studio
- Services: Broadcasting; Licensing; Publishing; Streaming; Television
- Revenue: ▲US$39.2 billion (2022)
- Number of employees: 35,000 (2020)
- Parent: General Electric (80%, 2004–2011; 49%, 2011–2013); Vivendi (20%, 2004–2011); Comcast (51%, 2011–2013; 100%, 2013–present)
- Divisions: NBCUniversal Media Group; NBCUniversal News Group; Universal Entertainment; Universal Destinations & Experiences
- Website: nbcuniversal.com

NBCUniversal Media, LLC (doing business as NBCUniversal or Comcast NBCUniversal since 2013 and abbreviated as NBCU) is an international multinational mass media and entertainment conglomerate that is a subsidiary of Comcast and headquartered at 30 Rockefeller Plaza in Midtown Manhattan in New York City. It is mostly involved in the media and entertainment industry, named for its two most significant divisions: the National Broadcasting Company (NBC)—one of the United States' Big Three television networks—and Universal Pictures, one of the major film studios.

It also holds a portfolio of domestic and international properties, including Bravo, Cozi TV, Telemundo, Universo, and the streaming service Peacock. Via its Universal Destinations & Experiences division, NBCUniversal is also the third-largest operator of amusement parks in the world.

NBCUniversal was created on May 11, 2004, as NBC Universal, Inc. on November 8, 2004, when Vivendi Universal sold 80% of Vivendi Universal Entertainment (Universal Pictures) to General Electric, NBC's then-owner. The sale gave Vivendi a 20% stake in NBC Universal, while GE held the remaining 80%. Comcast attained 51% and thereby control of the newly reformed NBCUniversal in 2011, by acquiring shares from GE, with GE buying out Vivendi's stake. Since 2013, the company has been wholly owned by Comcast, which bought the remaining 49% of the company from GE. Since November 2018, Sky Group, which was formed through the acquisition of Sky Italia and Sky Deutschland in 2014, is also under Comcast's control.

== History ==
Evolution of Comcast
- 1909: Independent Moving Pictures was founded by Carl Laemmle as the predecessor to Universal
- 1912: Universal Studios Hollywood was founded after Independent Moving merged with several smaller film studios
- 1915: Universal City, California, was established as the entertainment district for the Universal Studios Lot.
- 1924: MCA Inc. was founded by Jules Stein as a talent agency to book musicians
- 1926: RCA Corporation launched the NBC Radio Network, and by 1939, NBC began broadcasting on television.
- 1934: Decca Records America was established and would later grow to become Universal Music Group
- 1946: William Goetz and Leo Spitz began managing Universal Pictures, after merging International Pictures
- 1952: Decca Records America acquired a controlling stake in Universal Pictures
- 1958: MCA acquired the Universal Studios film lot and later purchased Decca Records America, and Universal Pictures in 1962
- 1963: Comcast was founded as American Cable Systems by Ralph J. Roberts
- 1973: Decca Records America is retired as a brand and renamed to MCA Records
- 1986: General Electric acquired RCA Corp and dissolved the company while retaining ownership of NBC
- 1990: Panasonic acquired a Controlling interest in MCA, but sold it to Seagram within five years after growing costs
- 1998: MCA Records acquired Polygram N.V. from Philips and was renamed to Universal Music Group
- 2000: Seagram Entertainment was sold to Vivendi and merged with StudioCanal to become Vivendi Universal
- 2002: NBC acquired Telemundo while Comcast acquired AT&T Broadband
- 2004: Vivendi Universal was consolidated with General Electric's wholly owned NBC to form NBCUniversal, while Universal Music Group was separated
- 2013: Comcast closed its acquisition of NBCUniversal from General Electric
- 2018: Sky Group was acquired from 21st Century Fox after a bidding war
- 2020: Peacock was launched
- 2026: Majority of NBCU's cable networks were spun off into another company named Versant, while Comcast later announced it would spin-off NBCUniversal and Sky into a separate company

=== Background ===
NBC and Universal Television had a long-term partnership dating back to 1950, when Universal Television's earliest ancestor, Revue Studios, produced a number of shows for NBC, although Revue would have hits on other networks as well. This partnership continued throughout a number of name changes and changes of ownership.

=== Television ===
NBC Universal Television has its modern roots in a series of expansions undertaken by NBC, whose full legal name was National Broadcasting Company, Inc. In the late 1980s, NBC began pursuing a strategy of diversification, including the formation of two NBC-owned cable-television networks: CNBC and America's Talking. NBC also had partial ownership of several regional sports channels and other cable channels such as American Movie Classics and Court TV (until 2007).

In 1995, NBC began operating NBC Desktop Video, a financial news service that delivered live video to personal computers. The following year, NBC announced an agreement with Microsoft to create an all-news cable television channel, MSNBC (using its subscriber base from America's Talking network). A separate joint venture with Microsoft included establishing a news website, MSNBC.com (now NBCNews.com).

In 1998, NBC partnered with Dow Jones & Co. The two companies combined their financial news channels outside the United States. The new networks included NBC Europe, CNBC Europe, NBC Asia, CNBC Asia, NBC Africa, and CNBC Africa.

In 1999, NBC took a 32% stake in the Paxson group, operator of PAX TV. Five years later, NBC decided to sell its interest in PAX TV and end its relationship with PAX owner, Paxson Communications.

In 2001, NBC acquired the US Spanish-language broadcaster Telemundo, which includes the bilingual Mun2 Television for $1.98 billion. That same year NBC acquired the cable channel Bravo.

==== Combining with Universal ====
Logo used from 2004 to 2011

In 2004, amid a major financial crisis caused by over-expansion, Universal Studios' parent company, Vivendi Universal Entertainment (a division of the French company Vivendi, which also owned Blizzard Entertainment), decided to sell an 80% stake in itself to NBC's parent company, General Electric (GE). The sale and resulting merger formed NBC Universal. The new company was 80% owned by GE, and 20% owned by Vivendi. The Universal Music Group was not included in the deal and is not part of NBC Universal.

On August 2, 2004, the television divisions of NBC and Universal Television were combined to form NBC Universal Television. Entertainment shows produced by the new group included The Tonight Show with Jay Leno, Late Night with Jimmy Fallon, and Saturday Night Live.

With the re-incorporation of National Broadcasting Company, Inc. to NBC Universal, Inc., Vivendi Universal Entertainment LLLP would be re-incorporated to Universal City Studios Productions LLLP (which would take on the "business name" of "NBCUniversal Television Distribution").

The formation of NBC Universal saw the establishment of NBC Universal Cable, which oversaw the distribution, marketing, and advertisement sales for thirteen channels. It also owned a 50% stake in Canal+ and a 15% stake in A+E Networks until 2012.

==== Global expansion ====
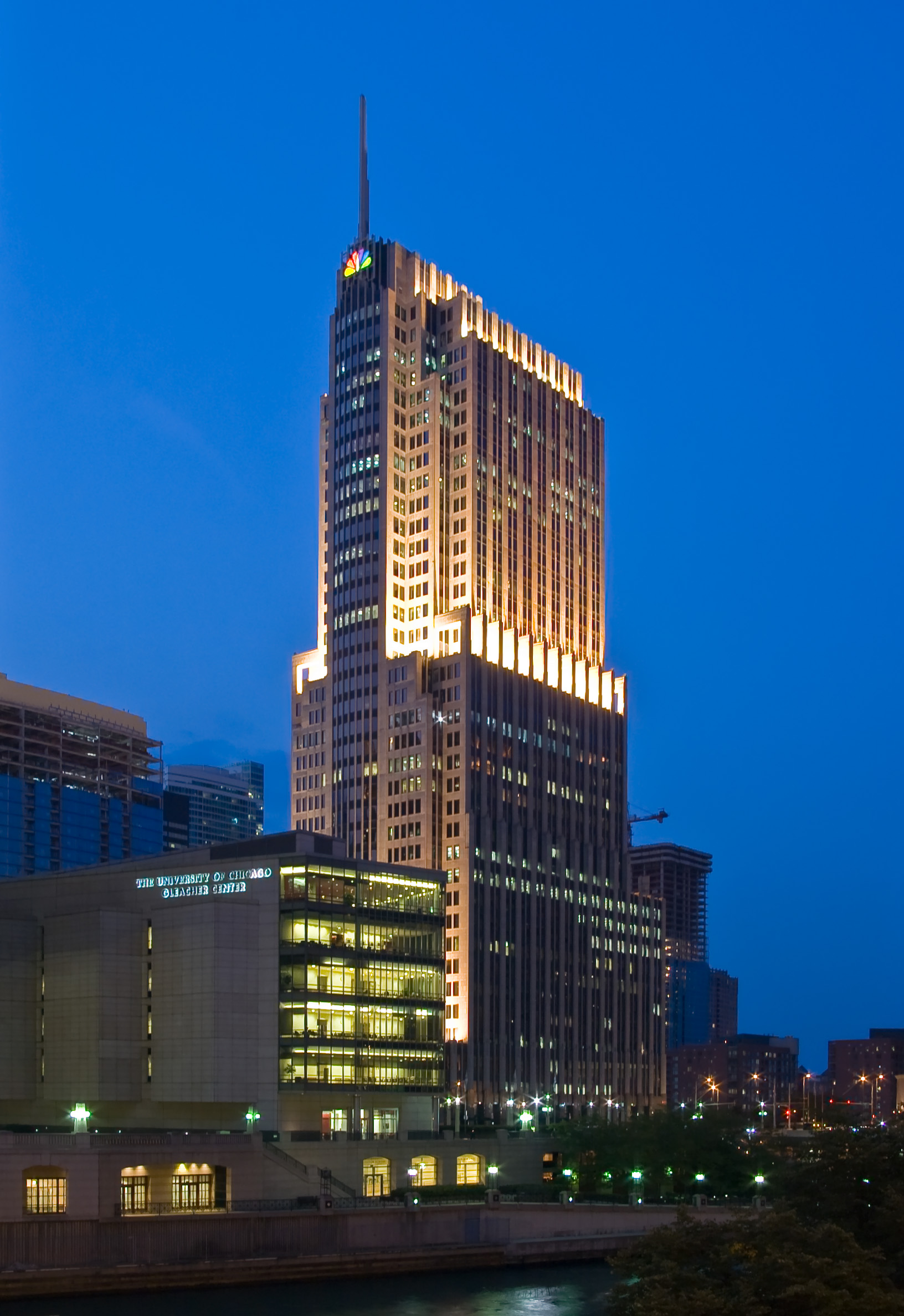
NBC Tower in Chicago, the base of the Company's and WMAQ-TV's Midwest operations

In the early 1990s, NBC began its expansion throughout Europe by creating CNBC Europe and its long-time successful NBC Europe Superstation by broadcasting NBC Giga throughout Germany and the rest of the European Union. NBC Europe helped to develop the Leipzig-based Games Convention, the largest European video game exposition with more than 100,000 visitors each year.

In 2005, NBC Universal joined HANA, the High-Definition Audio-Video Network Alliance to help establish standards in consumer electronics interoperability. Later that year, NBC Universal announced a partnership with Apple Computer to offer shows from all the NBC Universal TV networks on Apple's iTunes Store.

In January 2006, NBC Universal launched a new cable channel, Sleuth, later rebranded as Cloo. One year after Sleuth's debut, NBC Universal announced that the company would launch a horror-themed cable channel, Chiller, on March 1, 2007.

On June 14, 2007, NBC Universal Television Studio was renamed Universal Media Studios. The company explained that the reason for the name change was because "the new name fully describes the company's mission to be the premier content provider for television and digital platforms, spanning all television parts and creative genres."

In August 2007, NBC Universal purchased Sparrowhawk Media Group and renamed it NBC Universal Global Networks. This acquisition gave NBC Universal all Hallmark channels outside the United States, plus the English channels Diva TV, Movies 24, Hallmark Channel and KidsCo. Later that fall, the company also acquired the Oxygen network in a separate $925 million deal. The sale was completed one month later.

In the summer of 2008, NBC Universal, Blackstone Group and Bain Capital announced their intention to buy The Weather Channel from Landmark Communications. The deal closed on September 12, 2008. Shortly after the acquisition was completed, NBC announced that its existing TV weather network, NBC Weather Plus, would be shut down by December 31, 2008.

In July 2008, Universal Cable Productions split off from Universal Media Studios and moved into NBCUniversal's NBCU Cable Entertainment division.

The summer of 2008 marked NBC Universal's first venture into the United Kingdom with the acquisition of English television production company Carnival Films.

On November 12, 2008, NBC Universal acquired 80.1% of Geneon Entertainment from Dentsu in Japan, merging it with Universal Pictures Japan to form a new company, Geneon Universal Entertainment Japan.

On March 16, 2009, NBC Universal-owned cable channel Sci Fi announced that it would be changing its name to Syfy, replacing a generic term with a proprietary brand name that was able to be trademarked. The re-branding and name change took place on July 7, 2009.

On August 27, 2009, A&E Television Networks (A&E) merged with Lifetime Entertainment Services (Lifetime), giving NBC Universal an equal share of both Lifetime and A&E with The Walt Disney Company and Hearst.

On October 20, 2010, NBC Universal-owned horror/suspense-themed cable channel Chiller announced a major rebranding campaign incorporating a new logo and on-air look that launched on Wednesday, October 27, 2010. Syfy and Chiller President Dave Howe said, "We have very ambitious plans to grow this network as a brand." The channel would shut down in 2017.

=== Ownership by Comcast (2011–present) ===
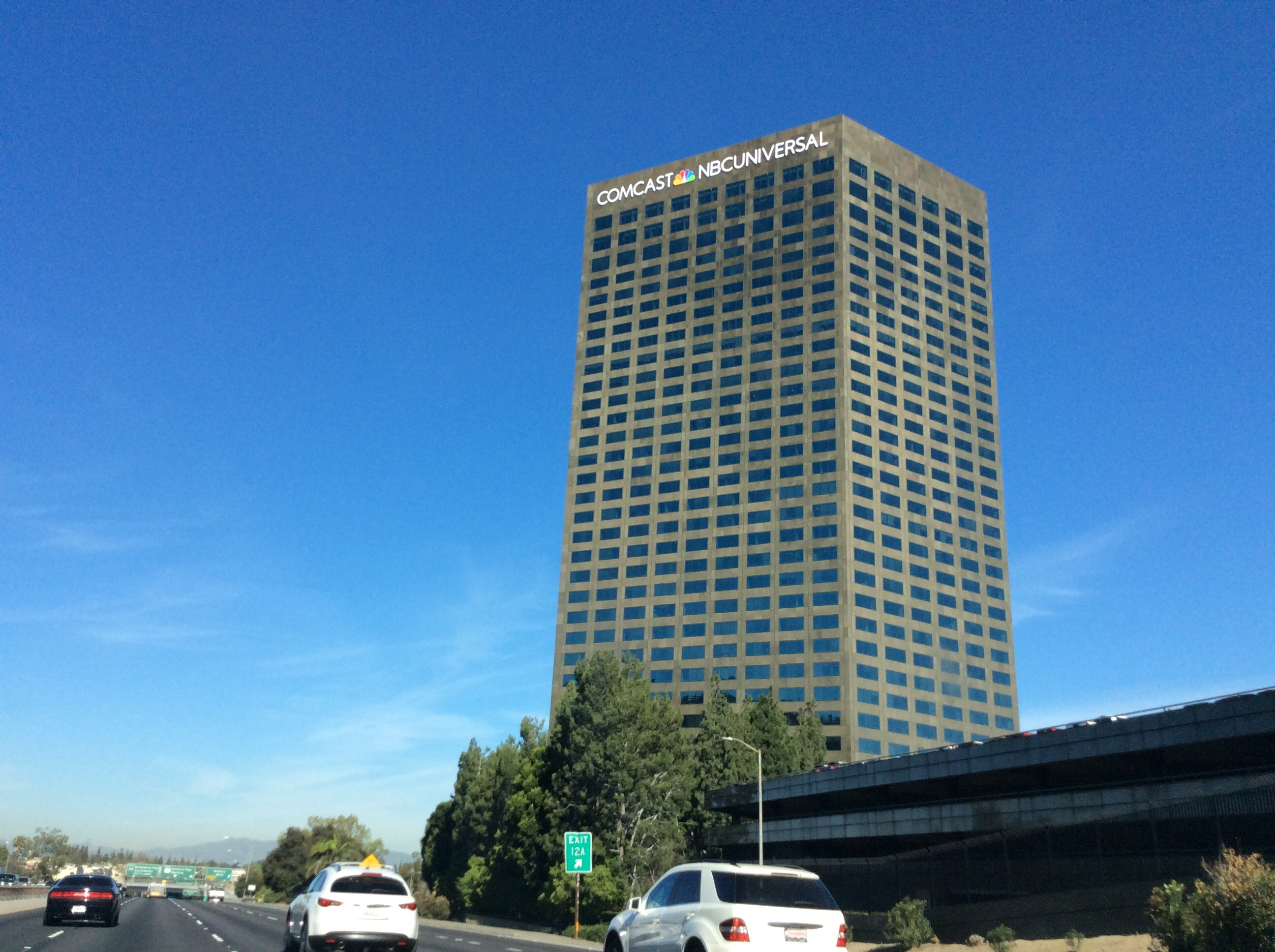
10 Universal City Plaza (in Los Angeles County) in 2015 after Comcast acquired GE's remaining stake in NBCUniversal. Notice the wording on the top of the building changed. The Comcast headquarters can be seen at Universal Studios Hollywood.

Alternate logo used from 2013 to 2024 to promote Comcast's ownership of NBCU

On December 3, 2009, after months of rumors, a deal was formally announced in which Comcast would buy a stake in NBC Universal from GE for $6.5 billion after the spin-off of certain businesses, pending regulatory approval. Under the agreement, NBC Universal would be controlled with a 51% stake by Comcast and GE would retain the remaining 49%. The deal includes a provision under which Comcast must contribute $7.5 billion in programming, including regional sports networks and cable channels such as Golf Channel, Versus, and E! Entertainment Television. GE used some of the funds, $5.8 billion, to buy out Vivendi's 20% minority stake in NBC Universal. Under the terms of the deal, Comcast reserved the right to buy out GE's share at certain times, and GE reserved the right to force the sale of its stake within the first seven years. Vivendi completed the initial transaction on September 27, 2010, selling a $2 billion stake to GE (approximately 7.66%).

U.S. regulators approved the proposed sale on January 18, 2011, with conditions. Comcast would have to give up NBC control over online video site Hulu and ensure NBC Universal programming is available to competing cable operators. The company unveiled a new logo designed by Wolff Olins, which replaced a logo featuring the NBC peacock and an invocation of the Universal Pictures globe, with a wordmark. The company also began to stylize its name in CamelCase as "NBCUniversal" rather than "NBC Universal", to reflect the unity of its two main divisions.

Logo used from 2011 to 2026

On January 26, 2011, Vivendi sold the remaining 20% of NBC Universal to GE, giving GE complete control of the company ahead of the completion of the sale of 51% of the company to Comcast on January 28, 2011. Comcast and GE formed the joint venture holding company NBCUniversal, LLC. NBC Universal, Inc. became a unit of Comcast and adopted the name NBCUniversal Media, LLC, on January 29, 2011.

Comcast had planned to buy out GE's 49% stake over the following seven years, but ownership of NBCUniversal remained split at 51–49% for two years, until the announcement on February 12, 2013, that Comcast intended to complete the $16.7 billion purchase ahead of time all immediately. The sale was completed on March 19, 2013.

The corporation, on July 19, 2012, formed the NBCUniversal News Group with the NBC News, CNBC, and MSNBC divisions. That same year, Comcast sold its stake in A&E Networks to Disney and Hearst, making the company a 50-50 joint venture.

In February 2013, NBCUniversal merged its two cable divisions, NBCUniversal Cable Entertainment & Cable Studios and NBCUniversal Entertainment & Digital Networks and Integrated Media, into one unit while moving out Telemundo and Mun2 to a new division, NBCUniversal Hispanic Enterprises and Content. The move also created the corporate-level position of executive vice president in charge of digital ventures. In July, the company placed NBC TV Stations and Telemundo's O&Os stations into a new division, NBCUniversal Owned Television Stations, with New England Cable News being transferred into NBC TV Stations.

On April 28, 2016, two days after The Wall Street Journal reported that NBCUniversal's parent-company Comcast was in talks with then-CEO Jeffrey Katzenberg about an acquisition following failed 2014 merger talks with Hasbro and SoftBank, NBCUniversal officially announced to acquire DreamWorks Animation for a total of $3.8 billion. Universal Pictures took over the distribution for DreamWorks Animation films after its deal with 20th Century Fox expired, following the release of Captain Underpants: The First Epic Movie in 2017. The sale was approved by board members, but was subject to regulatory approval. On June 21, 2016, the acquisition was approved by the United States Department of Justice. On August 22, 2016, the acquisition was completed with DreamWorks Animation now completely owned by Universal Pictures. That allowed Universal rights to both DreamWorks Animation and Illumination films beginning in 2019. DWA's first film to be distributed by Universal was How to Train Your Dragon: The Hidden World. The company later sold its stake in A&E to Disney and Hearst, making it a 50-50 joint venture.

On February 15, 2017, NBCUniversal acquired a minority stake in Amblin Partners, strengthening the relationship between Universal and Amblin, and reuniting a minority percentage of the live-action DreamWorks Pictures label with its former DreamWorks Animation division.

On February 28, 2017, NBCUniversal announced that it would acquire the remaining 49% stake in the Universal Studios Japan theme park that it did not own.

On May 1, 2017, NBCUniversal announced that Sprout would be relaunched as Universal Kids on September 9, 2017. Universal Kids would later cease operations on March 6, 2025.

==== Attempted buyout of 21st Century Fox assets and subsequent acquisition of Sky ====
On November 16, 2017, NBCUniversal's parent company Comcast made a bid to acquire 21st Century Fox's filmed entertainment, cable entertainment, and international assets, ten days after The Walt Disney Company (at the time, owners of rival network ABC, cable sports channel ESPN and theme parks Disneyland and Walt Disney World) was reported to be negotiating with Fox for the same assets. The deal contained key assets such as the 20th Century Fox film and television studios (Universal Pictures and Universal Television's respective rivals), a 30% stake in Hulu, television assets FX Networks, National Geographic Channel, and international television operations such as Star India, while excluding the Fox Broadcasting Company, the Fox News Channel, Fox Television Stations, Fox Business Network, Fox Sports 1 and 2, Fox Deportes, and the Big Ten Network, all of which were spun off into the "New Fox" company (later known as the Fox Corporation) run by the Murdoch family.

However, on December 11, 2017, Comcast officially dropped the bid, saying that "We never got the level of engagement needed to make a definitive offer." On December 14, 2017, Disney officially confirmed its acquisition of the most 21st Century Fox assets, which was granted approval from the United States Department of Justice Antitrust Division on June 27, 2018, and approved by stockholders from both companies one month later.

On April 25, 2018, Comcast launched its takeover offer for Sky plc at £12.50 per-share, or approximately £22.1 billion. 21st Century Fox owned a significant stake in Sky and was trying to take full control of it itself, ahead of its own acquisition by The Walt Disney Company. NBCUniversal CEO Steve Burke stated that purchasing Sky would roughly double its presence in English-speaking markets, and allow for synergies between the respective networks and studios of NBCUniversal and Sky. On June 5, 2018, Culture Secretary Matt Hancock cleared both 21st Century Fox and Comcast's respective offers to acquire Sky plc. Fox's offer was contingent on the divestiture of Sky News. On June 15, 2018, the European Commission gave antitrust clearance to Comcast's offer to purchase Sky, citing that in terms of its current assets in Europe, there would be limited impact on competition. Comcast included a 10-year commitment to the operations and funding of Sky News. On July 11, 2018, Fox increased its bid for Sky to £14.00 per-share, valuing it at £24.5 billion. Comcast subsequently counterbid just hours later with an offer at £14.75 per-share, valued at £26 billion.

On September 20, 2018, the Panel on Takeovers and Mergers ordered that a blind auction be held "in order to provide an orderly framework for the resolution of this competitive situation". In this process, Fox, followed by Comcast, made new cash-only bids for Sky. After these first two rounds of bidding, there would be a third round where both companies could make new offers. However, the third round of bidding would only be binding if both companies make a bid. Comcast won the auction with a bid of £17.28 per-share, beating Fox's bid of £15.67. Sky plc had until October 11, 2018, to formally accept this offer.

Following its auction victory, Comcast began to acquire Sky shares from the open market. On September 26, 2018, Fox subsequently announced its intent to sell all of its shares in Sky plc to Comcast for £12 billion. On October 4, 2018, Fox completed the sale of its shares, giving Comcast a 76.8% controlling stake at the time. On October 12, 2018, Comcast announced it will compulsorily acquire the rest of Sky after its bid gained acceptances from 95.3% of the broadcaster's shareholders with the company being delisted by early 2019. Sky was delisted on November 7, 2018, after Comcast acquired all remaining shares.

While NBCUniversal and Sky still operate mainly as separate entities within Comcast, following the Sky takeover Comcast has begun the process of integrating some of NBCUniversal's international operations with parts of Sky. Among other moves, NBCUniversal's pay television channels in the United Kingdom will be folded with Sky's, and Sky Deutschland will become the parent company of NBCU's German networks.

==== Launch of Peacock, further restructuring ====
On January 14, 2019, NBCUniversal announced that it would launch an over-the-top streaming service to compete with Netflix, CBS All Access, Amazon Prime Video, Hulu, Apple TV+, HBO Max, and Disney+. A reorganization of the major direct reporting division was made. Bonnie Hammer was appointed chairman of NBCUniversal Direct-to-Consumer and Digital Enterprises via the streaming services and the Digital Enterprises unit. Her former unit, NBCUniversal Cable Entertainment Group, was given to Mark Lazarus as chairman, NBCUniversal Broadcast, Cable, Sports and News. Universal Filmed Entertainment Group chairman Jeff Shell added NBC Entertainment, Telemundo and international channels as chairman of NBCUniversal Film and Entertainment. On September 17, 2019, NBCUniversal announced the service would be called Peacock and launched on July 15, 2020. In 2026, Comcast executives told investors that Peacock had grown a customer base of more than 46 million paid subscribers.

NBCUniversal Content Studios was formed in October 2019 with Hammer as chairman and George Cheeks as vice chairman, who was co-chairman of NBC Entertainment. This new unit consists of Universal Television and Universal Content Productions. Hammer was replaced as chairman of the Direct-to-Consumer and Digital Enterprises unit by Comcast executive Matt Strauss, while Paul Telegdy would become sole chairman of NBC Entertainment and continue reporting to Shell.

On February 25, 2020, Comcast announced it would purchase Xumo from the Panasonic/Viant joint venture for an undisclosed sum. The acquisition of the service—which will continue to operate as an independent business, albeit within Comcast's cable television division—stems mainly from Xumo's partnerships with smart TV manufacturers (including LG, Panasonic, and Vizio), which would allow Comcast to use Xumo's placement to market or showcase Xfinity and other Comcast services as well as use its technology to develop additional streaming platforms. The company plans to add content from the NBCUniversal programming library and the company's various television networks as well as use it to upsell Peacock, akin to ViacomCBS's utilization of Pluto TV.

In February 2020, it was reported that NBCUniversal had entered talks into acquiring Vudu from Walmart. On April 20, 2020, Fandango (jointly owned by Comcast and WarnerMedia) announced that it would be acquiring Vudu. The acquisition was completed on July 6, 2020.

In September 2022, NBCUniversal announced it had moved Universal Filmed Entertainment Group's consumer products division Universal Brand Development to Universal Parks & Resorts and had it merged with the latter's merchandise unit Universal Parks & Resorts Merchandise Group to form a single unified global consumer products business and focused on theme park experiences division for NBCUniversal's franchises renamed the former to Universal Products & Experiences, with Universal Brand Development president Vince Klaseus had led the rebranded division.

In 2023, following the firing of CEO Jeff Shell, NBCUniversal announced that corporate management will be led by a leadership team while Michael J. Cavanagh continues to oversee Comcast as a whole.

==== Versant spin-off and proposed divestiture from Comcast ====
On November 20, 2024, Comcast announced that it would spin off most of its cable networks and selected digital properties into a new publicly traded company controlled by its shareholders, to be led by Mark Lazarus. Initially referred to under the interim name "SpinCo", the company's name was announced as Versant on May 6, 2025. Versant will consist of properties such as USA Network, CNBC, MSNBC, E!, Golf Channel, Oxygen, and Syfy, as well as digital properties such as Fandango Media and SportsEngine; the aim of the spin-off is to separate them from NBCUniversal's flagship businesses, while providing them with the ability to make their own further investments and acquisitions. Bravo remains under the NBCUniversal umbrella, due to the network being a major provider of content to Peacock, while Telemundo's own cable operations remain unchanged. Universal Kids was also excluded from the spinoff, and was closed on March 6, 2025.

In October 2025, both CNBC and MSNBC began the process of formally separating themselves from NBC News, with the latter also undergoing a rebranding as "MS NOW" to remove the NBC name. The spin-off was completed in January 2026.

In December 2025, Comcast placed a bid to acquire the Warner Bros. studio unit from Warner Bros. Discovery in a cash-and-stock deal, under which the company would have been merged into NBCU. Comcast was initially beaten out by Netflix, Inc., but Paramount Skydance subsequently launched a hostile bid for the entirety of WBD that its shareholders would later accept in lieu of the Netflix offer. At the UBS media conference on December 8, Comcast co-CEO Mike Cavanagh admitted that their bid was "light on cash" compared to Netflix and Paramount's bids, and that "we didn't expect that we had a high likelihood of prevailing with a deal that made sense to us."

On March 13, 2026, NBCUniversal Syndication Studios announced that it would cancel all of its remaining first-run syndicated programming (including Access Hollywood, Karamo, and The Steve Wilkos Show; The Kelly Clarkson Show had also been cancelled ahead of the announcement) and exit the market, citing market changes prompted by the "programming preferences of local stations". NBCUniversal will continue to syndicate off-network reruns of its library programming.

On June 29, 2026, Comcast announced plans to spin off its media businesses, including NBCUniversal and Sky, as a new publicly-traded company under the NBCUniversal name, to be led by Cavanagh, within one year's time. The split will leave Comcast as purely a telecommunications company; it will initially maintain a 19.9% interest in NBCUniversal following the split. Cavanagh stated that the split would give NBCUniversal "the focus and opportunity and platform to invest behind the growth opportunities that it has in its own businesses, and the spaces around these businesses that offer growth, and where the business has the right to play", while Roberts stated that being an independent company would allow NBCUniversal more flexibility in partnering with third-parties.

==== Speculated acquisition by Netflix, Inc. ====
In the November 12, 2026 edition of Variety, Terry Dugan, entertainment finance co-head of law firm Moore & Van Allen, speculated that, in the aftermath of Paramount Skydance acquiring Warner Bros. Discovery & the subsequent re-branding to Skydance Corporation, and with Netflix, Inc.'s top-line growth dropping to 11.8% (the lowest level in three years) and subscribers in the U.S. spending less time with Netflix than they used to, as a way to jump-start it's growth, the major streamer could acquire NBCUniversal. He says smaller players, like Lionsgate, A24 or Neon on the movie side, or Starz or AMC Global Media on the TV side, simply wouldn’t be big enough to move the needle for Netflix in terms of boosting viewing on the service.

== Production partnerships ==
On December 16, 2015, Steven Spielberg, Jeffrey Skoll of Participant Media, Anil Ambani of Reliance Anil Dhirubhai Ambani Group, and Darren Throop of Entertainment One founded Amblin Partners, which would primarily focus on producing and distributing films and television using the DreamWorks Pictures, Amblin Entertainment, and Participant Media brands. Upon forming, Amblin Partners announced a five-year distribution deal with Universal Pictures, covering marketing and distribution via Universal or Focus Features. The Girl on the Train was the first film released under the deal, following the expiration of DreamWorks' distribution deal with Walt Disney Studios Motion Pictures with the release of The Light Between Oceans in August 2016.

A 2014 deal brought exclusive first look production and distribution rights to Universal for Blumhouse films.

Tina Fey joined the writing staff of Saturday Night Live in 1997, later becoming head writer and Weekend Update co-anchor. Her work as creator and star of the series 30 Rock from 2006 to 2013 included commentary on, and predictions about, Comcast's acquisition of NBCUniversal. Her production company's collaborations with NBCUniversal have included original series Unbreakable Kimmy Schmidt, Girls5Eva, The Fall and Rise of Reggie Dinkins, and the television adaptation of the Elle Cosimano novel Finlay Donovan Is Killing It.

Transitioning from his comedy work into a new role as a horror film director, Jordan Peele partnered with Universal Pictures to release his first two films, Get Out and Us. An extended exclusive deal in 2019 resulted in the release of Nope and a forthcoming fourth feature film. Peele's partnership with Universal also includes an initiative to cultivate emerging filmmakers.

A 2021 deal brought director Christopher Nolan to Universal, where he reportedly received full creative control on his 2023 feature film Oppenheimer. In late 2024, trade publications confirmed casting for a new, highly secretive project, which would later be revealed to be an adaption of The Odyssey with a release in the summer of 2026.

Over more than forty years, Dick Wolf has produced more than 2,000 hours of television with NBCUniversal and its predecessor companies, including the Law & Order, FBI, and One Chicago franchises.

== Sports broadcasting and streaming ==
NBCUniversal's predecessor companies created some of the earliest examples of filmed or broadcast sports coverage. According to cinema archivists, Universal Newsreel produced one of the first filmed reports of a collegiate football game (Army 26 - Boston 0, in October 1929). Experimental television station W2XBS, which would later become WNBC-TV, used a single television camera to broadcast the first televised college baseball game, between Columbia and Princeton.

- Since 2023, NBC has carried a Big Ten Conference football package on NBC and Peacock, under a rights agreement that extends to 2030.
- NBC is the broadcast home of the U.S. Open and other USGA championships, under an agreement extended through 2032.
- MLB baseball broadcasts returned to NBC and Peacock during the 2026 season under a three-year agreement.
- Under media rights agreements from 2025 through 2031, NBC carries the closing stretch of the NASCAR Cup Series season, including the playoffs and the championship race.
- In 2011, NBC Sports gained coverage of Sunday night NFL games and a share in the rotation of network homes for the Super Bowl.
- A 2024 deal returned NBA games to NBC (the network aired the league's games from 1954-1962 and from 1990-2002) and introduced regular streaming professional basketball coverage to Peacock.
- NBC has carried Notre Dame home football games since 1991, with the partnership extended through the 2029 season.
- In 2014, NBC secured U.S. broadcast and streaming rights for the Olympic Games through 2032. A 2025 deal extended the rights through 2036.
- A 2013 deal, later extended, guaranteed NBCUniversal exclusive broadcast, cable, and streaming rights to Premier League football matches through 2028.

== Current leadership ==
- Mike Cavanagh, co-CEO, Comcast
- Cesar Conde, chairman, NBCUniversal News Group
- Christopher Halpin, chief financial officer
- Kimberley D. Harris, executive vice president of Comcast and general counsel of NBCUniversal
- Donna Langley, chairman, NBCUniversal Entertainment
- Adam Miller, chief operating officer
- Craig Robinson, executive vice president and chief inclusion officer
- Matt Strauss, chairman, NBCUniversal Media Group
- Mark Woodbury, chairman and CEO, Universal Destinations & Experiences

== Libraries ==
=== NBCUniversal Film & Entertainment ===
- Universal Filmed Entertainment Group
  - Universal Pictures film library
    - Universal International Studios
      - Carnival Films
    - Universal 1440 Entertainment
    - DreamWorks Animation
      - DreamWorks Classics
        - UPA library (excluding the 1997 Mr. Magoo film, owned by Disney)
          - Several Godzilla films (under license from Toho)
        - The Harvey Entertainment Company library
          - Harvey Comics
          - Famous Studios/Paramount Cartoon Studios library (post–October 1950 and pre–March 1962) (under license from Paramount Pictures)
        - Noddy
        - Olivia
        - Felix the Cat
        - Where's Waldo?
        - Roger Ramjet
        - My Life Me
        - Voltron (under license from World Events Productions)
        - Worldwide distribution rights to OOglies (excluding UK television rights)
        - Worldwide distribution rights to Tracy Beaker Returns (excluding UK television rights)
        - Non-French licensing and distribution rights to The Owl & Co
        - Tribune Content Agency library
        - Western Publishing/Golden Books/Gold Key Comics/Golden Book Video library
          - Broadway Video's former family entertainment library
            - Tomorrow Entertainment library (pre-1974)
              - Rankin/Bass Productions (pre–September 1974)
            - Total Television library (excluding the 2007 Underdog film, owned by Disney)
          - Shari Lewis' two PBS series (Lamb Chop's Play-Along and The Charlie Horse Music Pizza)
        - CST Entertainment
        - Big Idea Entertainment
        - Entertainment Rights
          - Carrington Productions International
          - Link Entertainment
          - Filmation (excluding third-party licensed properties)
            - He-Man (1983 TV series and related specials and films) and She-Ra (1985 TV series and 2019 TV series; under license from Mattel)
          - Woodland Animations
          - Tell-Tale Productions (excluding the rights to Tweenies, owned by BBC Studios)
          - Sleepy Kids
          - Maddocks Animation
          - Other programs formerly under Entertainment Rights that were produced by other production companies
        - Chapman Entertainment
    - Universal Animation Studios
    - Illumination library
    - Focus Features film library
      - Good Machine
      - Gramercy Pictures
      - October Films
      - USA Films
      - Universal Focus/Universal Classics
      - Savoy Pictures
      - Focus World
      - Rogue Pictures (pre-2010)
    - Working Title Films
      - WT^{2} Productions
    - PolyGram Filmed Entertainment film library (post-March 1996)
    - Castle Films/Universal 8
    - Amblin Partners film library
      - Amblin Entertainment (only films released by Universal Pictures)
      - DreamWorks Pictures film library (post-2016)
    - Blumhouse Productions film library (minority stake; only films co-produced with Universal Pictures)
    - Back Lot Music discography
    - United International Pictures
    - Walter Lantz Productions library (excluding pre-1929 Oswald the Lucky Rabbit films, owned by Disney)
- Peacock original films

=== NBCUniversal Media Group ===
- NBCUniversal Studio Group
  - Universal Television library
    - Revue Studios
    - MCA TV
      - MTE
    - Multimedia Entertainment
    - Studios USA Television
    - PolyGram Television (post-1996)
    - USA Cable Entertainment
    - Wolf Entertainment
    - Universal International Studios
      - Heyday Television (joint venture with Heyday Films)
      - Chocolate Media
      - Lark Productions
      - Lucky Giant
      - Monkey Kingdom
      - Matchbox Pictures
      - Carnival Films
    - EMKA, Ltd.
      - Paramount Pictures film library (post-1928 and pre-1950) (under license from Paramount Pictures) (excluding Dr. Jekyll and Mr. Hyde, owned by Warner Bros. via Turner Entertainment Co., The Story of Temple Drake, owned by Disney via 20th Century Studios, and six Paramount films (The Buccaneer, The Miracle of Morgan's Creek, Sorry, Wrong Number, Bride of Vengeance, Rope of Sand and My Friend Irma), owned by Paramount itself)
    - Working Title Television
    - Telemundo originals
      - Telemundo of Puerto Rico Studios
      - Telemundo Studios
        - Telemundo Global Studios
        - Telemundo Streaming Studios
      - Underground Producciones
      - Telemundo Films
    - Amblin Television (excluding co-productions with other companies)
      - DreamWorks Television (post-2008) (excluding co-productions with other companies)
    - NBC Studios (In the House and The Fresh Prince of Bel-Air are distributed by Warner Bros. Television Studios due to a pre-NBCU syndication deal)
      - NBC Enterprises
      - SNL Studios (joint venture with Lorne Michaels)
    - NBC Entertainment
    - NBC International
    - DreamWorks Animation Television
    - Universal Content Productions
    - Universal Television Alternative Studio
- NBCUniversal News Group
  - NBC News
    - NBC News Studios
    - NBC News International
    - Peacock Productions
- Hayu originals
- Peacock originals
- Bravo originals
- Universal Kids originals
- G4 Media
  - Style/Esquire Network originals
  - Chiller originals
  - Cloo originals
    - Trio originals (post-2000)
  - Fearnet originals (excluding series produced by Sony Pictures Television and Lionsgate Television)
- Seeso originals
- Sky Vision

== See also ==
- List of conglomerates
