= WWBC =

- Cocoa, Florida; United States
- Broadcast area: Space Coast
- Frequency: 1510 kHz
- Branding: The Christian Voice of Brevard

Programming
- Format: Religious

Ownership
- Owner: Astro Enterprises, Inc.
- Operator: Kim Kassis
- Sister stations: WMIE-FM

History
- First air date: July 11, 1964
- Call sign meaning: "Wonderful World of Brevard County"

Technical information
- Licensing authority: FCC
- Facility ID: 3071
- Class: D
- Power: 50,000 watts days only; 25,000 watts critical hours
- Transmitter coordinates: 28°21′13″N 80°46′44.2″W
- Translator: See § Translators

Links
- Public license information: Public file; LMS
- Website: 1510wwbc.com

WWBC (1510 kHz) is a commercial AM radio station licensed to Cocoa, Florida, United States, and serving the Space Coast. It airs a Christian talk and teaching radio format and is owned by Astro Enterprises, Inc.

By day, WWBC is powered at 50,000 watts. WWBC is a daytimer, required to go off the air at night to avoid interference to other stations; during critical hours, the station is powered at 25,000 watts. It uses a directional antenna at all times. Programming is heard around the clock on three FM translator stations at 94.7, 99.9 and 100.7 MHz.

== History ==
The Blue Crystal Broadcasting Corporation, owned by William Earman, received a construction permit on January 27, 1964, to build a new daytime-only radio station on 1510 kHz in Cocoa. The station signed on July 11, with the transmitter mounted in the water in the Indian River at the Island Point Marina, and studios on Forrest Avenue. The station broadcast a pop music format.

Two years after building the station, Earman sold WWBC in order to become general manager of the Cocoa Chamber of Commerce. The new owners, Astro Enterprises, mostly consisted of employees of another station in town. Under Astro, WWBC began broadcasting a country music format. Ownership in Astro Enterprises completely turned over in 1975, when the company was sold to a group headed by Raymond A. Kassis of Baltimore. The station had already carried some religious programs, but under Kassis, a born-again Christian, WWBC shifted to a primarily religious format, airing local and national fare, along with some country music.

Kassis announced in 1977 his intention to apply for television channel 52 for a station focused on family programming. His bid opened the door for other applicants to file; one, Good Life Broadcasting, proposing a similar service, prompted Kassis to claim that the competitor had "blundered" by "taking a brother to court". The two parties would settle in late 1980, with The Good Life winning a construction permit for WTGL. Kassis would later start the National Christian Network from facilities shared with WWBC in Cocoa, which were also rented for use as an uplink facility by Sheridan Broadcasting Networks.

Four years after the Kassis purchase, the station was approved to increase daytime power to 1,000 watts. On December 2, 1984, Kassis started WMIE-FM 91.5, a noncommercial station also with a Christian format and oriented to the Black community.

WWBC was required to relocate its transmitter from the Island Point site when it was sold to condominium developers in the early 2000s. The new transmitter location was the former location of defunct WKKO (860 AM).

Kassis died in 2016. The intellectual unit of WMEL, which had moved among several stations in the Melbourne–Cocoa area, began broadcasting for a time on WWBC and its translators on November 1, 2016, as John Harper leased out the station.

== Translators ==
Broadcast translators for WWBC
Call sign	Frequency	City of license	FID	ERP (W)	HAAT	Class	FCC info
W234BI	94.7 FM	Cocoa, Florida	156428	125	76 m (249 ft)	D	LMS
W260CL	99.9 FM	Cocoa, Florida	146519	250	56 m (184 ft)	D	LMS
W264AS	100.7 FM	Melbourne, Florida	144128	250	141 m (463 ft)	D	LMS
