= American Christian Television System =

American religious television network

- Country: United States
- Broadcast area: National

Programming
- Language: English
- Picture format: 480i (SDTV)

Ownership
- Owner: Southern Baptist Convention

History
- Launched: May 15, 1984
- Closed: 2003
- Replaced by: FamilyNet, Hallmark Channel

The American Christian Television System (ACTS) was an American religious television network that was founded by the Southern Baptist Convention (SBC). Plans for the network involved a distribution reach through a combination of low-power and full-power broadcast television stations, most of which were to be built, and carriage on cable television providers.

Religious denominations had long been recipients of free air time from broadcast stations. This was often because stations had a need to fulfill "public interest" obligations in order to maintain their licenses. It was estimated that by the mid-1970s, the Southern Baptist Convention received approximately $10 million in donations annually in the form of 2,500 free weekly broadcasts. The programming that religious networks produced included (in addition to services and teaching) family-oriented entertainment programs and occasionally cartoons, such as JOT. ACTS would expand on these, originally intending on drawing its programming almost exclusively from in-house sources. ACTS was the first television network established by a Protestant denomination.

ACTS launched in 1984 as a non-commercial service, but was converted into a for-profit network in 1988. In 1992, ACTS began sharing channel space with a similarly formatted cable network, the Vision Interfaith Satellite Network, with the two being co-branded under the name VISN-ACTS. The unified channel later evolved into the Faith & Values Channel and Odyssey, before eventually relaunching (with minimal religious content) as the Hallmark Channel in 2001 following its purchase by Crown Media Holdings. ACTS ceased operations in 2003.

== History ==
ACTS was initially organized in December 1980, and was formed as a subsidiary of the Southern Baptist Radio and Television Commission (RTVC) and the Southern Baptist Sunday School Board. ACTS was to be a nonprofit venture, and also disallowed any form of on-air solicitation. The network was the brainchild of former SBC president Jimmy R. Allen. Allen had been elected to the post of president of the RTVC immediately following the end of his tenure as convention president. One of his primary goals in the post was to help local churches use radio and television effectively and to "explore the ways and means of accelerating a more direct primetime witness through television."

The plan for establishing the network revolved around building 100 or more low power (LPTV) and a small number of full-power stations throughout the United States. Each low-power station was to cost up to $150,000 to build and have a broadcast range of 10 to 15 miles from each station's transmitter site. In addition, it was planned that the network would eventually be carried by 1,000 cable systems. ACTS was projected to have a potential audience reach of 7 million households by the fall of 1984, and anywhere between 14 and 40 million at the end of 1985. However, some of the SBCs LPTV plans were held back when the Federal Communications Commission (FCC) changed some of the regulations regarding the licensing of such stations. At the time of its launch, the network would consist of 23 broadcast television stations and distribution on 200 cable systems. The Spacenet One satellite was selected for distribution of the signal; it launched in the spring of 1984.

The American Christian Television System launched on May 15, 1984, and was dedicated in June at the Southern Baptist Convention. By that time, the network had been granted 75 LPTV station licenses. At launch, ACTS consisted of two channels, ACTS and the Baptist Telecommunications Network (BTN). BTN was oriented toward churches, while the programming of ACTS was aimed at the general public. The programming mix of ACTS was planned to consist of about 75% family-oriented entertainment programs and 25% direct teaching and preaching. Daily programming was to be recycled in loops, up to 16 hours each day of its program content would consist of reruns.

The 1980s saw a rapid expansion in the number of cable channels vying for limited space on cable systems; this included a number of religious channels. Channels of this type which had already been established at the time that ACTS was formed included the National Christian Network, the PTL Satellite Network, the Christian Broadcasting Network, and the Trinity Broadcasting Network. By 1984, even more networks had been formed, including the Eternal Word Television Network and National Jewish Television; each of these competed for limited headend space on cable providers, a situation made more complicated by the fact that some companies would only carry one religious network. By 1986, the network had achieved a potential viewer reach of 2.6 million television households. It had also acquired $8.5 million in debt, leading to a restructuring of the organization. Internal SBC documentation admitted that the planning had been overly optimistic, and the operational and programming expenses were beyond what could be sustained.

The SBC sold ACTS in 1988 to a newly formed company called Friends of ACTS, Inc., based in San Antonio, Texas. While the SBC retained ultimate control over the channel, the new arrangement offered several advantages. Friends of ACTS, Inc. had been formed by a group of evangelical multidenominational investors as a for-profit entity, which the network had also now become. It was hoped that the multidenominational composition would attract large cable companies, some of which had shied away from carrying the network citing concerns about the SBC's singular control over content. To some extent, this meant that conservative faith traditions such as Lutherans, Presbyterians and Methodists, as well as Catholics and Jews were represented in the network's programming. Under the terms of the agreement, the SBC would continue to provide the majority of the programming and receive a small portion of revenues from the network. The sale was valued at about $170 million. At that time, the network was reported to have an audience reach of six million viewers.

The new management immediately switched satellites to Galaxy III, a move intended to increase ACTS' viewing potential. By 1990, the network was estimated to have a reach of 9.2 million viewers, and distribution on 475 affiliate stations and cable systems. That year, Jack B. Johnson was elected president of the RTVC, replacing Jimmy R. Allen. ACTS acquired FamilyNet from Jerry Falwell in 1991. The network was programmed separately from ACTS, and was carried exclusively on broadcast stations. FamilyNet was sold off to In Touch Ministries (operated by Dr. Charles Stanley) in 2007, representing the end of the SBC's direct ventures in television.

In July 1992, ACTS entered into a merger agreement with the Vision Interfaith Satellite Network (VISN). Each network was to provide part of the programming, but maintain separate branding identities during their allocated timeslots. The Southern Baptist Church would provide eight hours of programming daily for the network, which would produce substantial savings. At the time of the merger, ACTS had a viewer reach of 8.2 million television homes and VISN 12.8 million; the combined network would reach about 20 million and allow a potential audience of 57.5 million households with at least one television set. The merger opened up large markets that ACTS had been unable to get a foothold into including New York City, Los Angeles, San Francisco and Salt Lake City. The new deal would add over 1,000 cities to ACTS' audience, and the number of cable providers carrying the channel increased from 655 to 1,374. The new network would continue to ban activities such as proselytizing, on-air fundraising, and maligning other faiths.

Now they are content to be a small part of a national religious access channel, squeezing their programming... between religious programming that may espouse teachings that Christians see as heretical.

— Ron Harris on the ACTS-VISN merger.

Even so, some Baptists expressed concerns about the merger. Some were disturbed by the composition and programming of VISN. Whereas ACTS had specific content guidelines based on the views of the SBC, VISN did not rely on any form of creed or universal statement of faith. VISN was represented by member organizations of 54 faiths including non-Christians, ranging from Muslim groups to Buddhists, to others that some conservative Baptists considered cultish. One former producer for ACTS expressed that "ACTS will be working with those many would consider to be false prophets, assisting to build a large audience for their message... I feel that they have taken a step backwards in their effort to accomplish their mission."

This was made even more problematic by the fact that local Baptist-owned resources including churches and schools were sometimes providing the downlink to local cable systems. Also, partially because the Baptist Press had been prohibited from reporting on the matter, those local affiliates were not informed about the deal until after it was signed. Still others expressed concern that the goal of VISN had been to replace and supplant ACTS.

VISN-ACTS went through several relaunches in the 1990s including its 1992 revamp as the Faith and Values Channel and the 1996 format change into the Odyssey Network, with direct religious content erosion occurring along the way. In 2001, it became the Hallmark Channel, focusing mainly on entertainment programming aimed at a family audience. Support was withdrawn in 2003, and the ACTS network ceased operations.

== See also ==
- FamilyNet
- Hallmark Channel
- Ion Television
- National Christian Network
- PTL Satellite Network
- Vision Interfaith Satellite Network
