= Space Coast Area Transit =

Public transit system serving Brevard County, Florida

- Parent: Brevard County
- Founded: 1985
- Headquarters: 401 South Varr Avenue; Cocoa, Florida
- Locale: Melbourne, Florida
- Service area: Brevard County, Florida
- Service type: bus service, paratransit, vanpool
- Routes: 16
- Stations: 2
- Chief executive: James Liesenfelt
- Website: 321transit.com

Space Coast Area Transit is the public transit system serving the communities in Brevard County, Florida.

In 2021, Space Coast Area Transit will undergo a rebranding effort with the name of the system changing to 321Transit as an homage to the countdown sequence that has launched numerous spacecraft from Cape Canaveral.

== History ==
Space Coast Area Transit was formed in 1985 as a replacement for two competing bus services in Brevard County; Brevard Transportation Authority and Consolidated Agencies Transportation System, both of which refused to cooperate with each other, and often got into territorial and service disputes.

The system budgeted $6.9 million for operations in 2010. It collected $2.1 million in passenger fees, The rest comes from federal and state grants, and contributions from two cities.

In 2014, from 1 to 2% of residents rode the bus daily.

== Route list ==
There are 21 fixed bus routes running Monday through Saturday, with most routes running on an hourly basis. The 4, 6, 9, and 21 routes run on Sundays.

- 1 Titusville / Viera
- 2 Titusville
- 3 Merritt Island
- 4 Hwy 520 Connector
- 5 Mims / Titusville
- 6 Cocoa / Rockledge
- 7 Rockledge / Viera
- 8 West Cocoa
- 9 Cape / Cocoa Beach
- 10 Central Titusville
- 11 Port St John
- 12 Titusville / UCF Orlando
- 20 Heritage / West Melbourne
- 21 Downtown Melbourne
- 22 South Palm Bay
- 23 West Palm Bay
- 24 Melbourne / Eau Gallie
- 25 Palm Bay Connector
- 26 South Beach
- 27 East Palm Bay
- 28 North Melbourne
- 29 Melbourne / Viera
- 30 South Beach Connector
- 31 Hammock Landing / Sebastian
- 32 Dial-A-Bus
- 33 Eau Gallie Art District (Temporary Route)
