= Brevard Museum of History & Natural Science =

Museum and nature center in Cocoa, Florida, USA

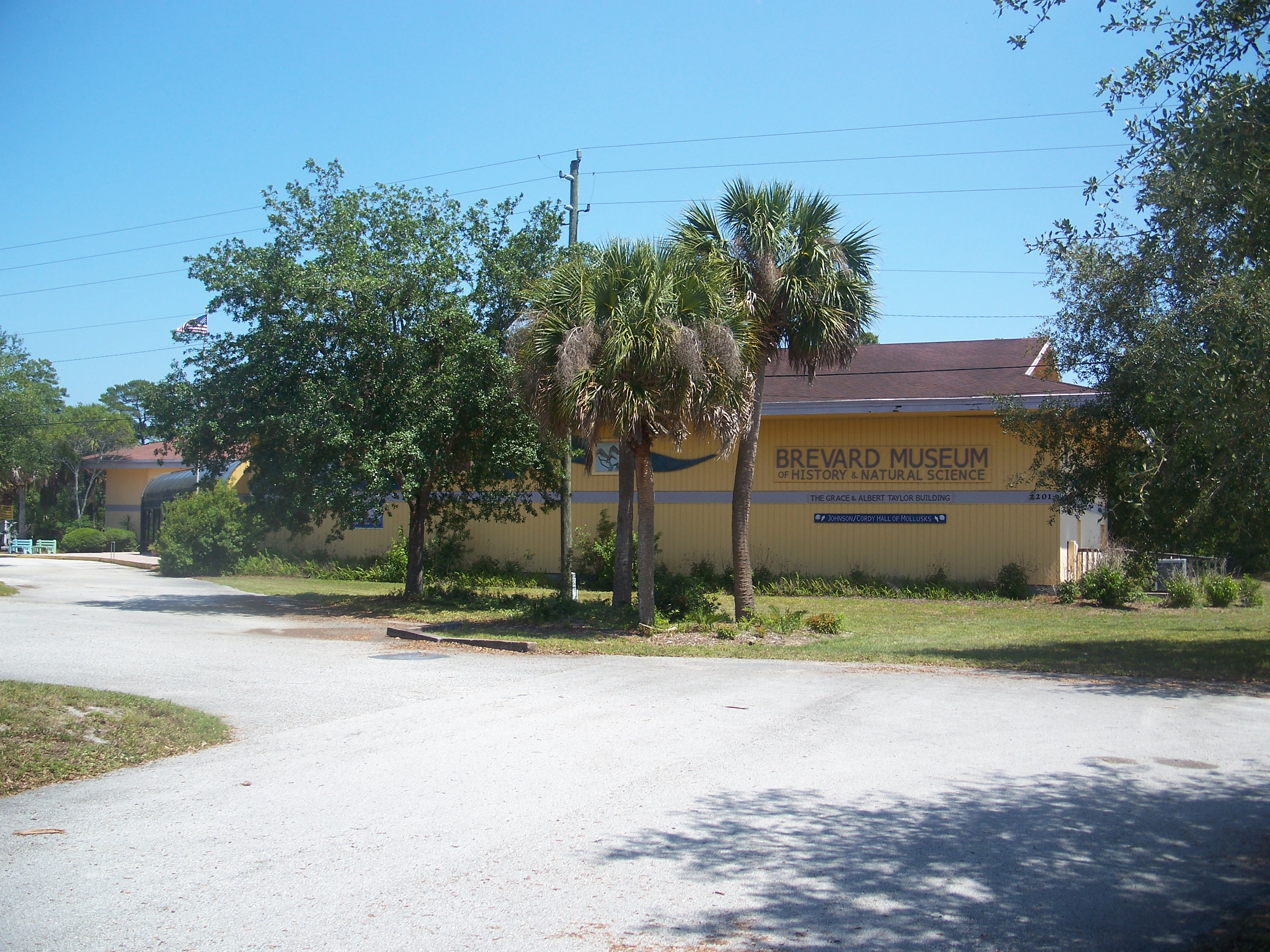

- Location within Florida
- Established: 1969 (opened to public in 1973)
- Location: 2201 Michigan Avenue; Cocoa, Florida
- Coordinates: 28.387778°N 80.763038°W
- Type: Anthropology, Archaeology, Children’s, Culture, History, Natural History, Nature Center, Park, Science
- Website: Brevard Museum of History & Natural Science

The Brevard Museum of History & Natural Science is located at 2201 Michigan Avenue, Cocoa, Florida near Eastern Florida State College and the Johnnie Johnson Nature Trails. The Johnnie Johnson hiking trails are open 7 days a week so hikers can follow the trails to the Eastern Florida State College Planetarium and Travis Park. Hikers may be able to see wildlife such as Florida gopher tortoises. The museum includes a 14,750 sq/ft facility that houses artifacts from the region and a 22-acre nature preserve. The Imaginary Station for the Little Visitors features a space capsule and a play area for youth. The museum also features a butterfly garden maintained by Master Gardeners. Visitors can view plants that attract butterflies, bees, and other pollinators.

The museum offers two wings of exhibits. The displays include a Florida timeline and rotating temporary exhibits. As of 2013, the museum had over 3,000 artifacts. Exhibits cover Brevard County history and Florida history. Topics include Indigenous Peoples of Florida, animals from the Ice Age to modern day, settlers to Brevard, Spanish ships, Florida industries, Flagler's railway, space history, and much more. Industries include the citrus industry and the turpentine industry. Visitors can view the personal effects of Albert and Grace Taylor, arrowheads, Seminole, Miccosukee, and Ais artifacts, shells, casts of prehistoric and modern animal fossils, replicas of a one-room school, general store, the Cape Canaveral lighthouse, and much more. Fossils of a Giant ground sloth and mastodon can be viewed in the exhibit featuring Ice Age animals. The museum features the remains of the "Windover Woman", the oldest human remains found on the North American continent, a re-creation of the Windover Dig, a "wet" archaeological site. The remains from the Windover archaeological site date between 7,000 and 8,000 years old.

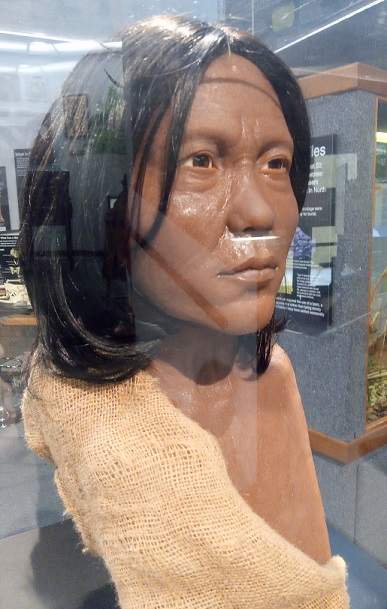
A facial reconstruction of what the Windover Woman might've looked like.

In September 2014, The Florida Historical Society became the museum's parent organization. The City of Cocoa has ownership of the museum building and property and the Florida Historical Society owned the collection in the museum until 2021 when FHS donated the collection to the City of Cocoa. The museum is also a part of Museums of Brevard (MOB) and a member of the Trail of Florida’s Indian Heritage. Currently, the Brevard Museum and Science Center (BMSC) is a 501(c)(3) nonprofit organization and admission is free to the public.

The museum also offers volunteer opportunities. Volunteers can choose to be docents in the museum or help maintain the hiking trails and educators can also book field trips by going to their website. The museum also accepts donations including monetary, in-kind assistance, and items for their collection.
