= National Christian Network =

Religious television network in the United States

- Country: United States
- Headquarters: Cocoa, Florida

Programming
- Language: English

History
- Replaced by: Liberty Broadcasting Network; FamilyNet; The Cowboy Channel

The National Christian Network was a religious television network in the United States which formed in 1979. The channel was founded by Ray A. Kassis and located in Cocoa, Florida, where it owned studios. The programming was originated from Jewish, Catholic, and Protestant groups; at the time of launch 54 separate groups had shown interest. The network was the fourth satellite-fed Christian network to be launched, and was a competitor to the Trinity Broadcasting Network, the PTL Satellite Network, and the Christian Broadcasting Network.

NCN shared the same satellite transponder with the Playboy channel. This caused a great deal of trouble for NCN, not because they shared the same transponder at different times of the day, but rather because NCN attempted to broker time on its channel to Christian programmers who were led to believe (falsely) that every cable company that was carrying Playboy was also carrying NCN. In fact most cable operators carried the Playboy feed only during the hours that Playboy was transmitting programming, and they blacked out the NCN portion.

Jerry Falwell acquired NCN in 1986, renaming it to the Liberty Broadcasting Network and moving its headquarters to Chesapeake, Virginia. At that time the network had an estimated 3 million viewers. LBN billed itself as the first "for profit inspirational network".

The Liberty Broadcasting Network was renamed to FamilyNet in June 1988, and at the same time became a for-profit entity. The network had lost about $3.2 million each year, and Falwell associate / former PTL manager Dr. Jerry Nims was brought in to head the new network.

FamilyNet was acquired by the Southern Baptist Radio and Television Commission in 1991. The SBC ran the network alongside its separately programmed American Christian Television System. In 1995 FamilyNet was available to 35 million homes through broadcast stations. The church sold FamilyNet to InTouch Ministries in 2007. In 2013, Rural Media Group purchased the network, converting the channel into the Western sports service The Cowboy Channel at the start of 2018.

== See also ==
- American Christian Television System
- The Cowboy Channel
- National Interfaith Cable Coalition
- PTL Satellite Network
