= Cocoa station =

Planned Brightline train station

Cocoa

General information
- Location: 2800 Clearlake Road; Cocoa, Florida; United States
- Coordinates: 28.39739°N 80.75202°W
- Owner: Florida East Coast Industries
- Operator: Brightline
- Line: Florida East Coast Railway
- Platforms: 1 side platform
- Tracks: 1

Construction
- Structure type: At-grade
- Parking: On-site parking garage; paid
- Cycle facilities: Racks
- Accessible: Yes

History
- Opening: 2030

Future services
Preceding station	Brightline	Following station
Orlando Terminus	Brightline	West Palm Beach toward MiamiCentral
Location

Cocoa station is a future Brightline inter-city rail infill station in Cocoa, Florida, United States. The station would be located just south of the Cocoa Curve, where Brightline's Orlando Line along State Road 528 merges with the Florida East Coast Railway main line. The station will be located on property already owned by Brightline, on the south side of the interchange between U.S. Route 1 and State Road 528. Service at this station is proposed to start by 2030.

== History ==
Brevard County had long desired a Brightline infill station since 2016. That same year, the Space Coast Transportation Planning Organization (SCTPO) identified an area of land owned by Brightline used for construction on their Orlando Branch as the best possible location for a station. The site, located at 2800 Clearlake Road, was chosen due to its possession by Brightline and its location just south of the Cocoa Curve, which already requires trains to slow down. The SCTPO, since their initial study, had been pursuing a station there since.

Brightline had initially expressed interest in adding a station on the Space Coast. Brightline indicated that Cocoa would make the most sense for a Space Coast station because of its close proximity to Port Canaveral's cruise lines as well as for positioning for future expansion to Jacksonville. In June 2023, Brightline purchased land in Titusville, with potentially having plans to develop a residential neighborhood and station in Cocoa. However, even after the West Palm Beach to Orlando segment began revenue service on September 22, 2023, Brightline had not yet formally committed to adding a station in Cocoa, as funding for it would need to be secured first.

The SCTPO would eventually be able to secure $15.5 million in federal grants to fund a station at their chosen location. On March 12, 2024, following a unanimous decision by the Cocoa City Council, an additional $5 million from the city's budget was allocated to fund the station. The city of Cocoa would also begin to coordinate with community stakeholders to present a financial proposal to Brightline detailing station funding plans, as well as continue to push for additional federal and state grants, while Brevard County Commission Chair Jason Steele also began to push for a tourism capital grant for the station. With a total of $20.5 million in funding for the station finally secured, a meeting was held between Cocoa city officials and Brightline executives later that day, leading to an announcement by Katie Mitzner, Brightline's director of public affairs, announcing that the company was finally ready to begin formalizing the station with Space Coast stakeholders and that they would begin finalizing a plan for the station. However, a timeline for construction or opening has not yet been established.

On May 8, 2024, Brevard County commissioners voted to approve a recommendation from the Brevard County Tourist Development Council for an additional $5 million grant for the station. In addition, Cocoa applied for a Consolidated Rail Infrastructure and Safety Improvements (CRISI) grant from the Federal Railroad Administration (FRA). The grant application of $47.46 million was not approved by the FRA. The city would reapply for another grant from the FRA, this time submitting a request for a $47.21 million Federal-State Partnership for Intercity Passenger Rail (FSP) grant, with the total cost of the project expected to be $83.21 million. The FRA later announced on September 22, 2025, that funding under the FSP would be reissued as the National Railroad Partnership Program, having an application deadline of February 6, 2026. The city resubmitted its request based on the new data requested by the FRA.

On August 11, 2026, the City of Cocoa and the SCTPO officially announced that approximately $57.5 million in federal funding had been secured through the National Railroad Partnership Program for the development of the station. In addition to the federal grant, approximately $37.9 million in local matching funds would be provided, bringing the projected total project cost to approximately $95.4 million. Construction of the station would begin in the coming years, with service planned for 2030.
