= Historic Derby Street Chapel =

Church building in Florida, United States

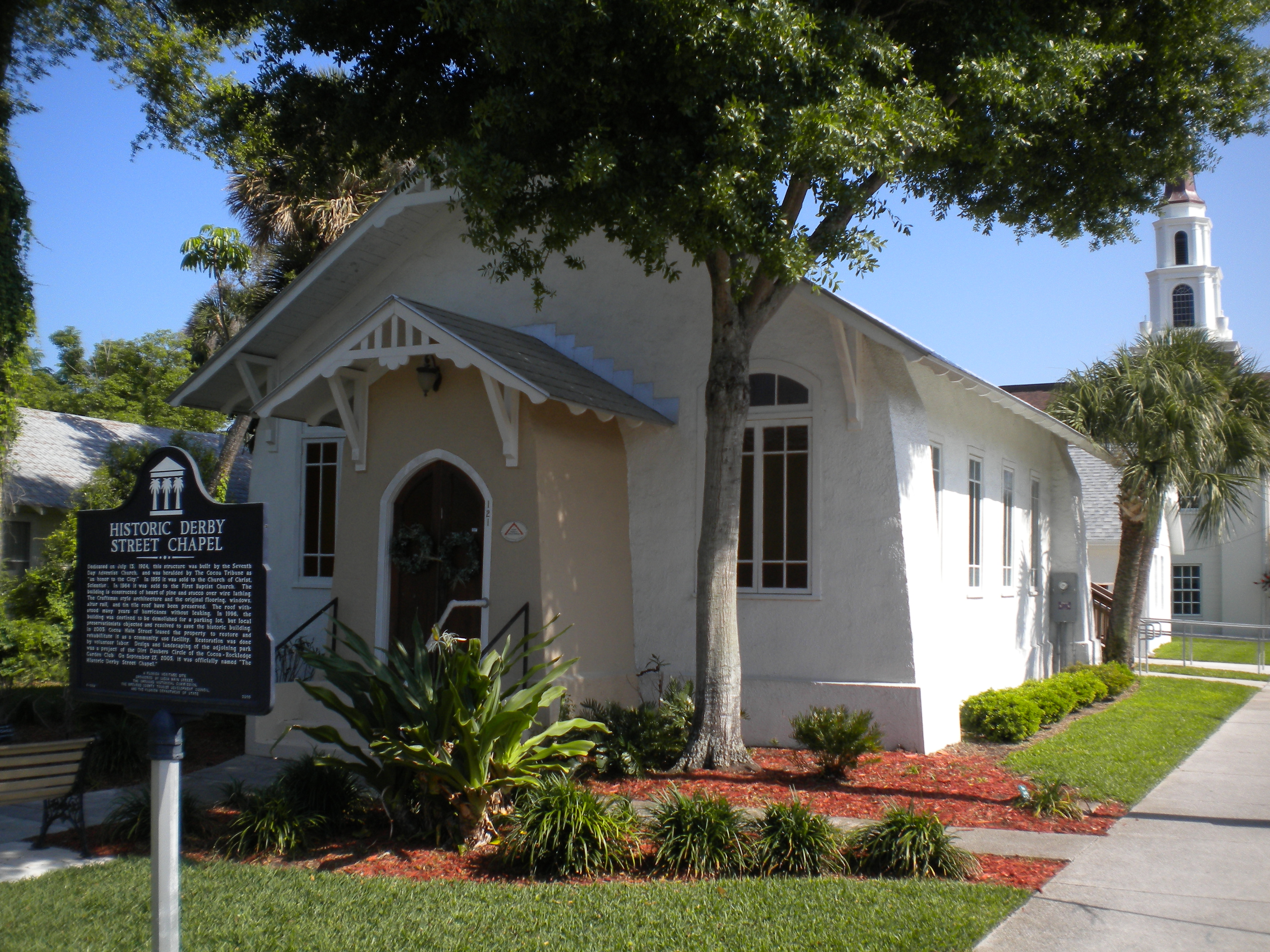
- Historic Derby Street Chapel
- Interactive map of the Historic Derby Street Chapel area

General information
- Architectural style: Craftsmen style architecture
- Location: 121 Derby Street; Cocoa, Florida, United States
- Coordinates: 28°21′02.71″N 80°43′33.78″W
- Completed: ca. 1916-1920

Technical details
- Structural system: Pine and stucco

Design and construction
- Architect: Alonzo Bruce Russell
- Engineer: Alonzo Bruce Russell

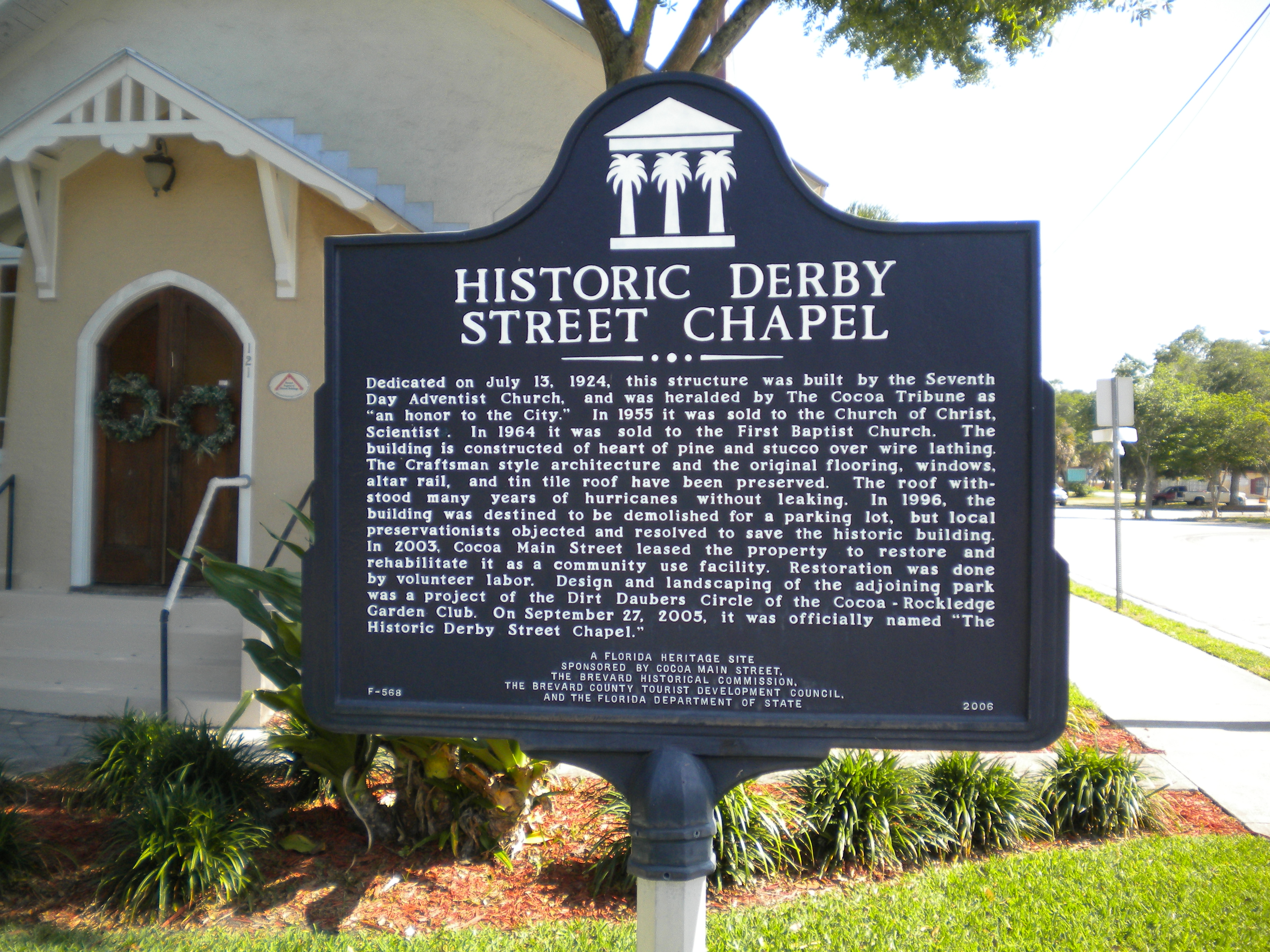
Historical marker on site

The Historic Derby Street Chapel, also known as Derby Street Chapel, is a historic church building located at 121 Derby Street in Cocoa, Brevard County, Florida. Constructed between 1916 and 1920 as a Seventh-day Adventist church, it was sold to First Church of Christ, Scientist, Cocoa, in 1955. In 1964, the Christian Science church sold it to the First Baptist Church of Cocoa, which retains ownership. Cocoa Mainstreet, which holds a 25-year lease on the property, renovated the building to meet current accessibility standards. It now serves as a venue for weddings, vow renewals, memorials, and other small events.
