= Community Woman's Club =

Community Woman’s Club
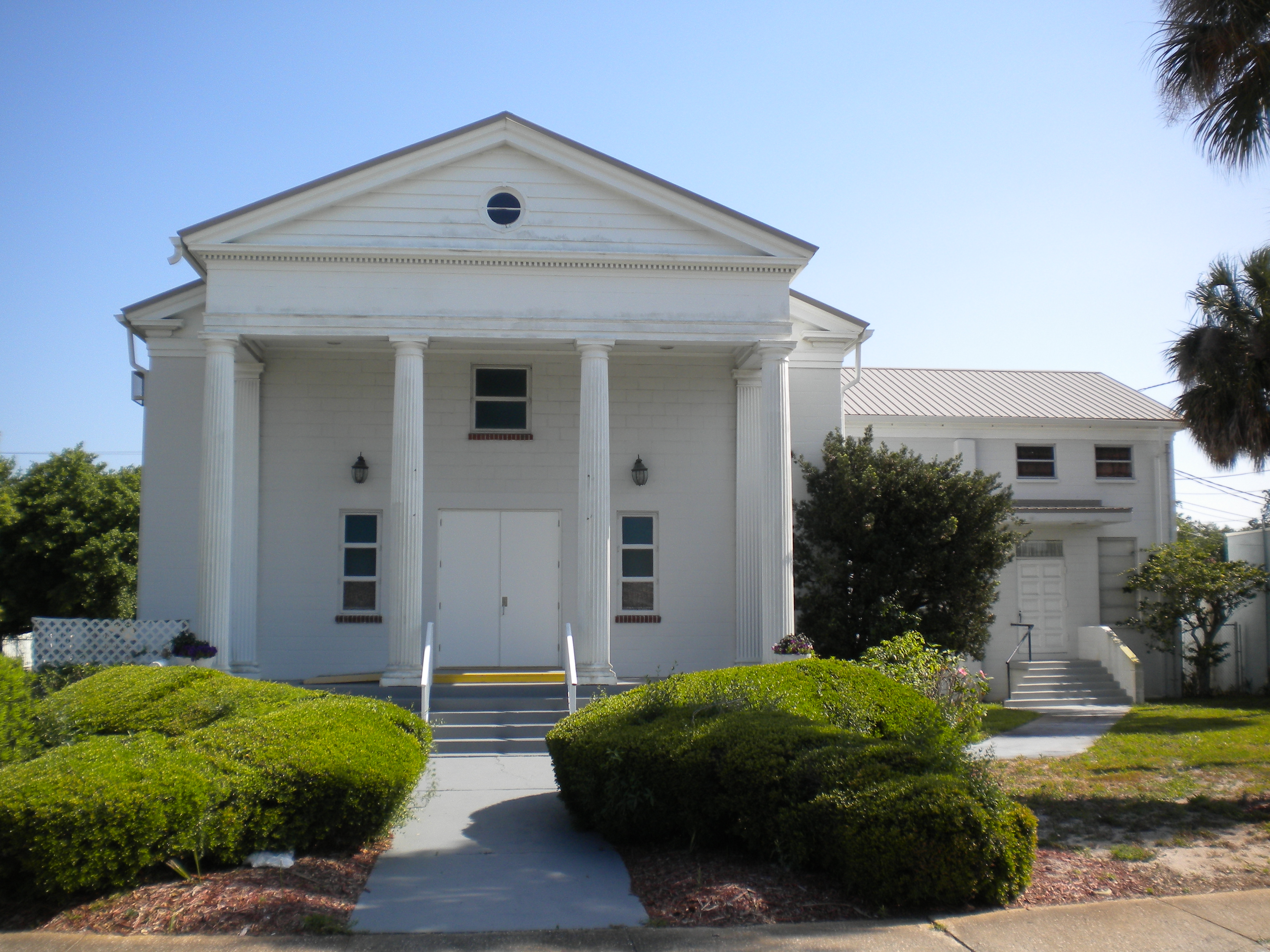
- Community Woman’s Club building
- Interactive map of the Community Woman’s Club area

General information
- Location: 5 Rosa L Jones Drive; Cocoa, Florida, United States
- Coordinates: 28.350144°N 80.726884°W
- Completed: Circa 1950

The Community Woman's Club is a historic U.S. building located at 5 Rosa L Jones Drive, Cocoa, Florida. The Central Church of Christ initially constructed the building circa 1950 and the Community Woman's Club of Cocoa purchased it on June 8, 1966. The address was originally 5 Poinsett Drive, but the name of the road changed to Rosa L Jones Drive sometime in the late 2000s. The Brevard Heritage Council placed the building in the Brevard Register of Historic Buildings.
