= Vision Interfaith Satellite Network =

- Country: United States
- Broadcast area: National

Programming
- Language(s): English
- Picture format: 480i (SDTV)

Ownership
- Owner: National Interfaith Cable Coalition

History
- Launched: July 1, 1988
- Replaced by: Faith & Values Channel; Odyssey; Hallmark Channel

Religious Television Networks, 1995
Network	(millions)
CBN / Family Channel	62.4
FamilyNet	35
Trinity Broadcasting	27
Faith & Values	24
Inspiration Network	9
Potential viewers of religious television networks, 1995.

The Vision Interfaith Satellite Network (VISN) was an American religious cable and satellite television network that was owned by the interfaith group National Interfaith Cable Coalition, in cooperation with cable operators. The channel became known as the "PBS of religion" for the inclusive nature of its programming, which was designed to "place its accent on dialogue rather than apologies."

In 1992, VISN began sharing channel space with a similarly formatted cable network, the American Christian Television System, with the two being co-branded under the name VISN-ACTS. The unified channel later evolved into the Faith & Values Channel and Odyssey, before eventually relaunching (with minimal religious content) as the Hallmark Channel in 2001 following its purchase by Crown Media Holdings. Throughout the latter portion of the 1990s, the channel hosted a continuously diminishing roster of religious programming.

== Background ==
VISN was founded in late 1987 by the National Interfaith Cable Coalition (NICC). The NICC was an interfaith foundation created to provide programming and guidance to VISN. Many of the initial members of the NICC were also members of the National Council of Churches, whose membership had experienced trouble keeping airtime for local religious programming following media deregulation in the 1980s. Startup costs for VISN were covered by several cable providers; spearheaded by Tele-Communications Inc., early financial backers of the channel included American Television & Communications, United Cable, Jones Intercable, Post-Newsweek Cable and Heritage Communications. The network was owned by the NICC and Liberty Media, a subsidiary of Tele-Communications Inc. Although the network was advertiser-supported, it disallowed on-air solicitation during its programming.

In part, the network was created as a response to the televangelist scandals of Oral Roberts, Jim Bakker and Bakker's PTL Satellite Network, and the general popularity of conservative religious television such as the Christian Broadcasting Network. Another goal of the network was to help ease the crowding of local cable networks by combining their programming onto one channel. This goal was enumerated by Robert Thomson of founding company Tele-Communications Inc., who stated that "no operator has the capacity for a separate channel for each denomination."

The Vision Interfaith Satellite Network launched on July 1, 1988. At its launch, the NICC was represented by 23 faith groups covering all branches of Christianity. In addition, certain existing channels were represented with the inaugural members of the NICC, among them, the Gospel Music Network. The group hoped to have a potential audience reach of 35 to 40 million subscribers by the network's fifth year of operation.

VISN reached 6.4 million cable television subscribers by 1990. The network continued to expand rapidly, reaching 12.8 million subscribers by 1992. By that year, VISN represented 54 faith groups including a full range of Christian denominations from Episcopalians to Latter Day Saints, to non-Christian groups such as Buddhists and Muslims. In late 1992, VISN merged with the American Christian Television System, a network owned by the Southern Baptist Radio and Television Commission. Both networks would share the same satellite transponder (and effectively, channel space), but the two networks would remain independently owned, run their own programming and maintain separate on-air identities. The ACTS network brought in 8.2 million subscribers, increasing VISN's total national coverage to about 20 million households. The combined network was branded as VISN-ACTS.

VISN-ACTS was rebranded as the Faith & Values Channel in 1993, with its programming being refocused to include more news and information content.

The cable industry wouldn't put country music, rap, rock, polka and big bands into one channel. That's exactly what they've tried to do with Faith & Values.

— Bob Higley, vice president, TBN

In 1995, originating founding sponsor Tele-Communications Inc purchased a 49% ownership stake in the channel, and began to rebuild its programming with a focus on family-oriented entertainment, eliminating all preaching programs. VISN had long been pressured by the competition created by other religious networks in cable markets. Longtime rivals included the Trinity Broadcasting Network, the Eternal Word Television Network and FamilyNet. In 1995, the Trinity Broadcasting Network called the Faith and Values Channel "a failed experiment in religious programming", stating that its overarching approach to faiths and entertainment programming hurt its efforts at attracting viewers. By 1996, the channel's programming was such that it was said to eschew its own religious label.

Citing poor growth, the channel was relaunched as the Odyssey Network in August 1996 and given the slogan "Exploring Life's Journey". At the time of the relaunch, the channel's subscriber reach potential had increased to 25.6 million households, and the NICC espoused representatives from 65 faith groups.

The network continued to have problems throughout the late 1990s. External competition from Pax TV and CBS, the need for internal harmony, and general funding issues kept the channel from acquiring the rights to high quality programs such as Touched by an Angel and Nothing Sacred. The channel sought new partners to rectify the situation, striking deals with The Jim Henson Company and Hallmark Entertainment in 1998. Odyssey's 1999 relaunch refocused the network's programming to include more family and values-oriented entertainment programming and even less direct religious content.

Odyssey was relaunched as the Hallmark Channel on August 5, 2001, featuring substantially reduced religious content. By this point, the channel was available to 30 million cable and satellite subscribers throughout the United States. The Southern Baptist Convention pulled ACTS out of the network in 2003 and withdrew from the NICC.

Faith & Values Media, a production company owned by the NICC, continues to produce content both for television and the internet. The corporation retains about 5% of the Hallmark Channel and has a long-term contract with the network. In 2007, a subsidiary of Faith & Values Media acquired the ecumenical internet discussion forum Ecunet.
