= WMIE-FM =

- Cocoa, Florida; United States
- Broadcast area: Melbourne-Titusville-Cocoa, Florida
- Frequency: 91.5 MHz
- Branding: WMIE 91.5 FM

Programming
- Format: Christian talk and teaching - Contemporary Christian music

Ownership
- Owner: National Christian Network, Inc.

History
- First air date: December 1984

Technical information
- Licensing authority: FCC
- Facility ID: 47548
- Class: C3
- ERP: 20,000 watts
- HAAT: 30 meters (98 ft)
- Transmitter coordinates: 28°21′21.00″N 80°44′47.00″W
- Translator: 102.3 W272BA (Cocoa Beach)

Links
- Public license information: Public file; LMS
- Webcast: Listen Live
- Website: WMIEfm.com

WMIE-FM (91.5 MHz) is a non-profit Christian FM radio station licensed to Cocoa, Florida, and serving the Melbourne-Titusville-Cocoa, & the Beaches, in Brevard County, Florida's radio market. The station is currently owned by National Christian Network, Inc.

WMIE-FM airs a mix of Christian talk and teaching and Contemporary Christian music. National religious leaders heard on WMIE-FM include Er. David Jeremiah, Dr. Charles Stanley, Dr. R.C. Sproul & many others, as well as local ministers.

WMIE-FM has its studios, offices and transmitter are on West King Street in Cocoa. WMIE-FM also has an FM translator in Cocoa Beach, W272BA at 102.3 MHz.

In December 1984, the station first signed on the air.
