= Hallmark Channel =

American cable television channel

- Country: United States
- Broadcast area: Nationwide
- Headquarters: Studio City, California

Programming
- Language: English
- Picture format: 1080i HDTV

Ownership
- Owner: Hallmark Cards
- Parent: Hallmark Media
- Sister channels: Hallmark Family; Hallmark Mystery

History
- Launched: September 1992; 34 years ago
- Replaced: American Christian Television System (1984–1992); Vision Interfaith Satellite Network (1988–1992)
- Former names: VISN/ACTS (1992–1993); Faith & Values Channel (1993–1996); Odyssey Network (1996–2001)

Links
- Website: www.hallmarkchannel.com

Availability

Streaming media
- Service(s): Frndly TV, FuboTV, Hulu + Live TV, Philo, Sling TV, YouTube TV

Hallmark Channel is an American cable television channel owned by Hallmark Media, a subsidiary of Hallmark Cards. The channel broadcasts family-oriented general entertainment programming, including television series and made-for-TV movies.

The channel has its origins in the religious broadcasters American Christian Television System (ACTS) and the Vision Interfaith Satellite Network (VISN). The two services timeshared on a single satellite signal, which was later rebranded as The Faith & Values Channel in 1993. After Liberty Media acquired a 49% stake in the channel in 1996, it relaunched as the Odyssey Network. As Odyssey, the channel gradually phased out religious programming in favor of family-oriented films and television series—a pivot that intensified after Hallmark Entertainment and The Jim Henson Company acquired major stakes in the channel in 1998.

In 2001, after a corporate reorganization, Odyssey rebranded as Hallmark Channel. By the 2010s, Hallmark Channel had established a focus on made-for-TV movies—particularly romance films and comedies—themed around specific seasons and holidays throughout the year. The strategy sought to create synergies with Hallmark's core greeting card business, and build upon the strength of the "Countdown to Christmas" programming event it first introduced in 2009.

In 2019, The New Yorker magazine published an article about the Hallmark Channel and its dominance over North American cable television and the cable industry using Christmas themed movies to gain popularity. As of November 2023, Hallmark Channel is available to approximately 70 million pay television households in the United States—down from its 2015 peak of 90 million households.

== History ==
The Hallmark Channel traces its history to the launch of two separate religious cable channels, the American Christian Television System (ACTS) and the Vision Interfaith Satellite Network (VISN). The two networks began alternating time on a shared transponder slot on the Galaxy III satellite in 1992. Under the original timeshare agreement, the network was branded as VISN/ACTS. Each network was provided time for its programming blocks, and would use their own logos.

VISN launched on July 1, 1988, and was founded by the National Interfaith Cable Coalition (NICC), in cooperation with several cable providers. The coalition's membership consisted of 65 different religious groups. It aired for about 16 hours a day and ran religious programs from mainline Protestant denominations such as the United Methodist Church, the Evangelical Lutheran Church in America and the United Church of Christ. In addition, Roman Catholic, The Church of Jesus Christ of Latter-day Saints, Jewish, and Islamic faiths also provided some programming. VISN aired during the morning and evening hours. ACTS commenced operations in 1984, and was owned by the Southern Baptist Convention. It aired programming from evangelical and fundamentalist non-charismatic Christian groups such as the SBC, the Christian Reformed Church, and the Association of Regular Baptist Churches, as well as well-known evangelists such as Jerry Falwell, Charles Stanley and D. James Kennedy. Both channels aired several hours a week of religious children's programs, some of which overlapped, including Sunshine Factory, Joy Junction, Davey and Goliath, and Jot.

In 1993, VISN-ACTS was relaunched as the Faith & Values Channel; it began adding a few secular programs during this time, including news, information, and lifestyle programming

=== Odyssey Network ===
In 1995, cable conglomerate Tele-Communications Inc.'s Liberty Media acquired a 49% ownership stake in the Faith & Values Channel, and took over operational control of the network. It added more secular programming to the network and reduced religious programming to about 10 hours a day. In 1996, the network was rebranded as the Odyssey Network (although on-air promotions often referred to the network simply as "Odyssey"), and launched a website, Odysseyfamily.com.

Logo as Odyssey Network from 1996 to 2001

Hallmark Entertainment and The Jim Henson Company bought significant stakes, paid partly through programming commitments, in Odyssey in late 1998; by this time, Odyssey carried a mix of religious programming and family-friendly secular shows, with a limited amount of original productions. Liberty had convinced Hallmark not to launch its own domestic channel, citing difficulty in getting carriage for a new network on existing cable systems. The NICC and Hallmark-Henson would hold equal shares while Liberty increased their stake, and the three groups shared control of the board. Hallmark and Henson would have say over chief executive selection. While adding Henson's and Hallmark's libraries, the channel could not make major programming format changes, so cable systems could not drop them. Hallmark hired former Fox Kids Network worldwide vice-chairman Margaret Loesch that year to overhaul Odyssey into a family channel (Loesch had quit Fox in late 1997, ironically after News Corporation acquired Odyssey's rival, The Family Channel, with plans to revamp that network; however, she had to wait out a non-compete clause in her contract before officially joining Odyssey).

Under the new ownership structure, Odyssey underwent a major programming revamp on April 4, 1999; the revamp decreased the amount of religious programs on the network down to an average of four hours a day, although more hours were religious on the weekend. The channel began to focus more on family-targeted entertainment programming, including classic sitcoms and variety series (such as ALF and The Muppet Show), children's programs (such as The Archie Show, Fraggle Rock, and Zoobilee Zoo), and family-oriented films and miniseries (such as the cable broadcast premiere of Hallmark and Henson's 1996 adaptation of Gulliver's Travels). The afternoon block Leonard Maltin Presents featured films from the RHI Entertainment-owned Hal Roach Studios library, while Wednesday nights featured classic Hallmark Hall of Fame productions.

Loesch explained that the three owners shared a commitment to "quality programming" and "raising the bar on television", and that the channel was being programmed in a direction reminiscent of television in the 1950s and 1960s, where broadcasters "really had quite broad fare, but you never had to ask anyone to leave the room, like your children".

=== Hallmark Channel ===
In 2000, Odyssey's ownership group was re-organized as Crown Media Holdings, with Hallmark, Chase Equity Associates, Liberty Media, and the NICC transferring their shares in Odyssey to the company. There were plans for the company to go public; Hallmark received all of Crown Media's class B shares, which were worth ten votes each, thus giving it control of Crown Media. After The Jim Henson Company was sold to German company EM.TV & Merchandising in February 2000, it sold its remaining stake in Odyssey the following month in exchange for 8% of Crown Media's stock.

In March 2001, Crown Media announced that Odyssey would rebrand as Hallmark Channel on August 6, taking advantage of the better-known Hallmark brand to encourage wider carriage. Loesch commented that some viewers had mistaken Odyssey as being a travel or science fiction channel rather than family entertainment, and that Hallmark Channel's main goal would be telling "great stories". Crown Media negotiated with the NICC to reduce the amount of religious programming Hallmark Channel would air to 14 hours per-week (as well as allow for less overtly-religious programs with broader, spiritual themes), and help fund and distribute a digital cable network for the NICC. The channel's launch programming included the miniseries The Infinite Worlds of H.G. Wells, a new slate of original movies, and acquired programming such as Tales from the Neverending Story.

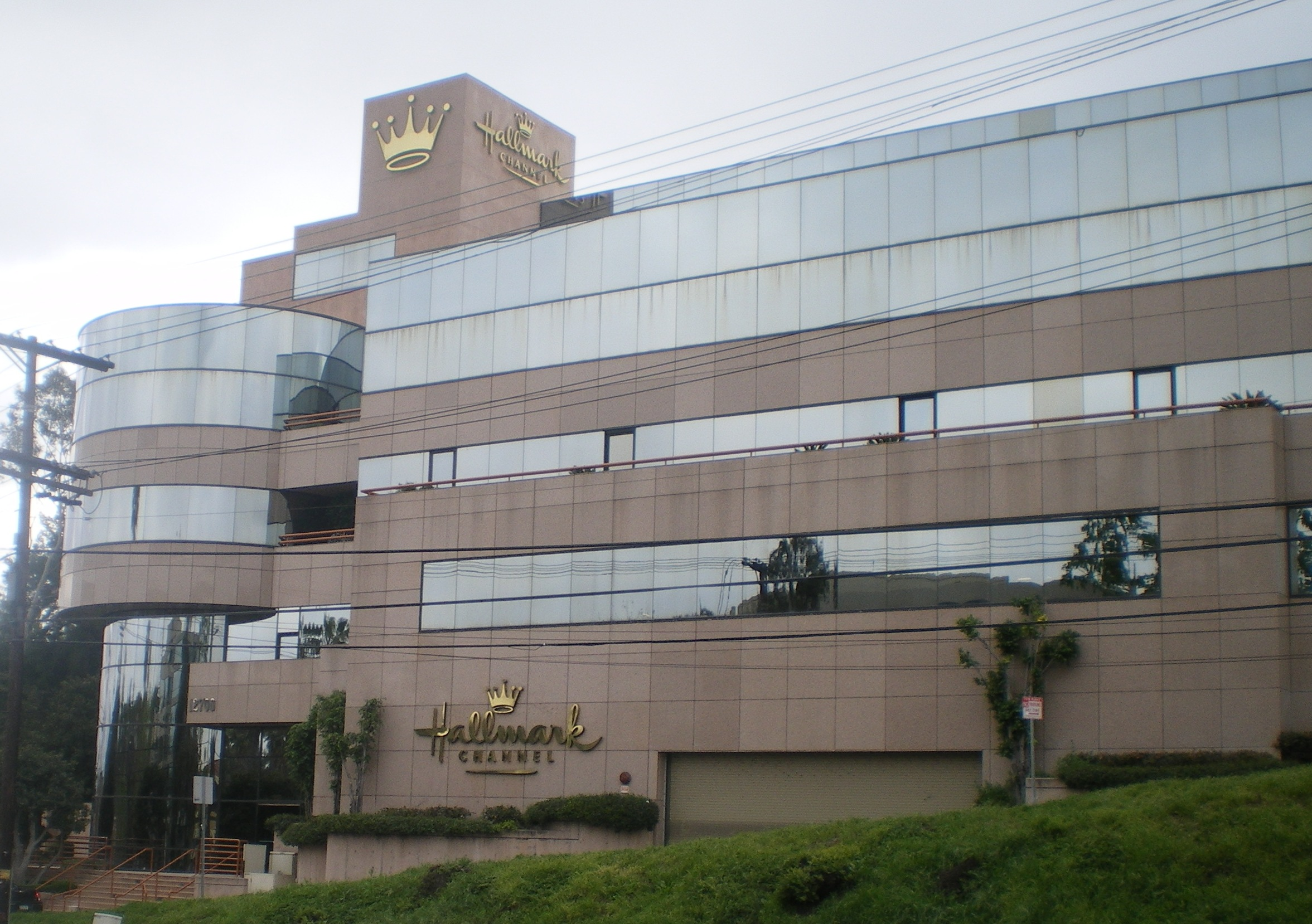
Hallmark Channel's headquarters in Studio City, California

In 2002, the Hallmark Channel premiered a weekday morning talk show, New Morning. A Sunday morning version, hosted by Naomi Judd, titled Naomi's New Morning, debuted in 2005 and lasted two years before being pulled from the schedule in early 2007. In 2004, the network launched a sister channel, Hallmark Movie Channel.

Hallmark Channels in international markets were sold for about $242 million in 2005 to Sparrowhawk Media, a private equity group backed by Providence Equity Partners and 3i. The channel in 2005 had its highest-rated year with 34% increase in viewers, being ranked seventh in growth, and the highest-rated movie on a basic cable network (Meet the Santas).

With the expiration of RHI Entertainment's exclusive contract with Hallmark Channel, Larry Levinson Productions became the channel's sole producer. In 2007, additional producers were added as suppliers as the channel increased the number of original films by 50% from 20 in 2007 to 30 in 2008.

In January 2008, the Hillary Clinton presidential campaign purchased an hour of Hallmark Channel's primetime slots under a paid programming arrangement to run a town hall special promoting Clinton's campaign for President of the United States on February 4, the day before the multi-state "Super Tuesday" primaries. The wheel series "Mystery Movie" was discontinued in 2008 as the channel was doing better with lighter romances. Reporting on Hallmark Channel's 2009 upfronts, The New York Observer noted that the channel had built a brand on formulaic romantic movies, explaining that "while other media companies were thrashing around in a tumultuous, confusing sea of unpredictability, the Hallmark Channel was thriving with the television equivalent of comfort food."

=== Bill Abbott era, Martha Stewart agreement ===
In May 2009, William J. "Bill" Abbott—who had previously held an advertising sales role—succeeded Henry Schleiff as president of Hallmark Channel. Abbott planned to retool its programming to appeal to younger viewers without alienating its core audience of baby boomers, aiming for Hallmark Channel to become "a destination for lighter fare, for comedies and quality programming" that was "true" to the Hallmark brand. In a 2019 interview, Abbott explained of these goals that "you should turn on our channel and almost feel like you're walking into a [Hallmark Gold Crown] store." The channel also began to experiment with abbreviated commercial breaks featuring one 30-second advertisement, with these slots costing twice the amount of a normal 30-second slot.

Later that year, Hallmark Channel held the inaugural "Countdown to Christmas"—a seasonal programming event featuring four original holiday film premieres, and a Movie Night with Hoops & Yoyo block on Friday nights—the first cross-promotional campaign between Hallmark Channel and Hallmark Cards.

In January 2010, Hallmark Channel announced a multi-year strategic partnership with Martha Stewart Living Omnimedia (MSLO), under which first-run episodes of The Martha Stewart Show would move from syndication to Hallmark Channel beginning that September, and MSLO would produce a series of primetime specials for the channel (which would begin with specials focused on Halloween and Christmas). It was reported that Abbott had sought to reposition Hallmark Channel as a lifestyle-oriented channel to compete with the Scripps Networks Interactive channels, and shift its television films exclusively to Hallmark Movie Channel to appeal to younger demographics.

On March 16, 2010, Hallmark Channel also acquired rights to MSLO library content, announcing a daily daytime block (lasting for seven hours on weekdays, and a shorter block on weekends) of these programs beginning March 26. Crown Media and MSLO were also reportedly exploring the formation of a lifestyle cable network as a joint venture, tentatively named "Hallmark Home". In June 2010, the channel ordered several additional MSLO-produced series to accompany Martha, including Mad Hungry with Lucinda and Whatever with Alexis and Jennifer.

Due to low viewership, Hallmark shortened the Martha Stewart block by two hours in October 2010. At least 500 hours of new original programming was slated for the 2011–12 season, including 25 original movies, 160 hours of MSLO programming (including new series Emeril's Table, and additional Martha Presents specials), and a series in development with poet Maya Angelou. In addition, Hallmark Hall of Fame productions would air on Hallmark Channel a week after their television premieres on ABC.

In January 2012, Martha was cancelled by Hallmark Channel due to its high production costs, with production ending after the conclusion of its then-current season. Hallmark Channel was still in discussions over the fate of its other MSLO-produced programming. During its upfronts for the 2012–13 season, Hallmark Channel announced the new daytime talk shows Home & Family and Marie! with Marie Osmond, as well as a slate of original movies that would include pilots for adaptations of the novels Cedar Cove and When Calls the Heart. In October 2012, ahead of the January 2013 premiere of its pilot movie, Cedar Cove was given a series order as Hallmark Channel's first original primetime program. When Calls the Heart was also picked up as a series in 2013, while Marie! was canceled after one season.

On March 15, 2013, the channel introduced a new family-oriented Friday night movie block, Walden Family Theater, in partnership with Walden Media and others. In April 2014, the channel launched a TV Everywhere video on-demand service, "Hallmark Channel Everywhere", which offers a streaming selection of Hallmark Channel films and series for subscribers on participating television providers. At some point before July 2021, the name of the app was changed to "Hallmark TV".

=== Focus on seasonal programming ===
In the 2014–15 season, Hallmark Hall of Fame premieres moved exclusively to Hallmark Channel, with up to four new films scheduled per-year. Two new series, Good Witch and Signed, Sealed, Delivered, were picked up for the 2014–15 season. In February 2015, Hallmark Channel held an inaugural "Countdown to Valentine's" event to build off the success of Countdown to Christmas, featuring four movie premieres.

In 2015, Mariah Carey directed and starred in a Christmas movie for Hallmark. She also hosted Mariah Carey's Merriest Christmas, which was the channel's most-viewed show. Thus in May 2016, Carey signed a three-film deal for her to develop, executive-produce, direct, co-star, and write an original song for three movies with one for "Countdown to Valentine's Day". The channel's first "Winterfest" seasonal programming was in January 2016. At its March 2016 upfronts, Hallmark Channel executives revealed that they planned to divide their programming into themed seasons year-round, to build upon the success of Countdown to Christmas and other franchises.

On October 20, 2016, Hallmark Channel and the Hallmark Movies & Mysteries channel were added to the Sling TV service. On November 15, 2017, PlayStation Vue added Hallmark Channel, Hallmark Movies & Mysteries, and Hallmark Drama to its lineup.

In October 2017, Hallmark Channel launched a new, over-the-top subscription service known as Hallmark Movies Now, which features new and existing original content from the network.

In November 2017, the channel beat all four major broadcast networks in the ratings one night with its Hallmark Hall of Fame movie, The Christmas Train. In March 2019, Hallmark announced it had dropped Lori Loughlin from future company projects due to her role in the 2019 college admissions bribery scandal.

In December 2019, the channel stopped airing advertisements for the online wedding registry Zola.com that included two brides kissing each other, because of complaints that it was lesbians kissing and promoted same-sex marriages. A main complainant was One Million Moms, a division of the socially conservative American Family Association, which has been described as an anti-LGBTQ hate group by the Southern Poverty Law Center. Similar advertisements with heterosexual couples kissing were not pulled. As a result, social media users called for a boycott of the channel, while competitors like Netflix and the Disney-owned Freeform cable channel responded by touting their LGBTQ inclusivity. On December 15, Hallmark reversed its decision and said it would reinstate the advertisements and work with GLAAD, an LGBTQ media monitoring organization, to create more inclusive programming. The series finale of Good Witch, which aired in July 2021, featured the first lesbian kiss in a Hallmark production.

Abbott quietly and abruptly stepped down as president of Hallmark Channel in February 2020; the following year, a group led by Abbott acquired the Southern lifestyle channel Great American Country (GAC) from Discovery, Inc. to relaunch it as a direct competitor to Hallmark, Great American Family. The channel has emulated the programming strategies that were mounted by Hallmark Channel under Abbott, and has also leveraged talent who had been associated with the channel's original productions.

On October 31, 2022, Hallmark announced a distribution agreement with NBCUniversal, under which live and on-demand programming from its networks would be available to Peacock subscribers. The agreement lapsed in April 2025, with the network now prioritizing its in-house OTT subscription service Hallmark+ (a 2024 relaunch of Hallmark Movies Now).

== Programming ==
Hallmark Channel's programming consists of original dramas and made-for-TV movies, and syndicated reruns of sitcoms. It also airs the Hallmark Hall of Fame anthology series.

Despite largely being an apolitical brand, Hallmark Channel has garnered a following among politically conservative viewers in suburban and rural areas who, according to Manhattan Institute for Policy Research's Steven Malanga in a Los Angeles Times op-ed, feel the network and its original programming feed their desire to "express traditional family values and also to steer away from political themes and stories that denigrate religion."

=== Original movies ===
The network's made-for-TV movies are characterized as family-friendly and inspirational, ranging from holiday-themed films to westerns. In the early stages of the channel's development, Hallmark Channel had a steady one-movie-a-month, or 12-a-year, production schedule with the films mainly being produced by RHI Entertainment. However, in 2008, Crown Media had ramped up its production schedule to approximately 30 movies a year and opened up two other production companies, though RHI still produces some movies for Hallmark Channel. The network premiered 35 original movies during the period from 2009 to 2010, with production ramping up further in the years that followed.

Hallmark original movies were budgeted at $2.2 million in 2007. Hallmark does not pay the full cost of films, thus they are often deficit-financed by their producers. Many of Hallmark Channel's productions are produced in Canada, using local talent and filming locations (including a preference towards location shoots instead of sound stages) to reduce production costs. A number of actors and actresses have become known for frequent appearances in Hallmark Channel movies, including Candace Cameron Bure, Lacey Chabert, Kristoffer Polaha, and Holly Robinson Peete among others; Polaha explained that Hallmark "operates on loyalty".

The New Yorker felt that the often-formulaic structure of Hallmark's films contributed to their popularity, describing them as usually featuring "independent women with interesting jobs", "appealing romantic prospects", and often being set in towns where residents "care for one another, run viable small businesses, and compete in gingerbread bake-offs—America as we might wish it were, and as some believe it once was." Film producer Brad Krevoy similarly explained that Hallmark movies were "as comforting as programming can be. You can grab a blanket, enjoy a glass of wine, and know the movie will have a happy ending."

==== Series ====
- Hallmark Hall of Fame: Originally only an encore or library home for the Hallmark Hall of Fame anthology film series, the series moved its original showings to the channel in 2014.
- Mystery Movie (also Hallmark Channel Mystery Wheel): The channel began a Sunday night mystery movie wheel series called Mystery Movie in 2004. This wheel series consisted of four individual movie series of four films that would also be later shown on Hallmark Movie Channel. Two of the film series were Mystery Woman and Jane Doe. A successor series, Original Mystery Wheel, was established in 2015 on the Hallmark Movies & Mysteries channel.
- Walden Family Theater (2013) On March 15, 2013, the channel started its family friendly Friday night movie series, Walden Family Theater in partnership with Walden Media, Arc Entertainment, Procter & Gamble and Walmart. P&G and Walmart were sponsoring partners with Walmart selling the movies DVD in store the Tuesday after airing, while Arc and Walden were producing partners. The first movie was the world premiere of Return to Nim's Island, one of six new films produced for the series. Space Warriors was shown later in the premier season, with additional films drawn from Hallmark's library of films. The series' second season was launched on September 6, 2013, with the premiere of the film, Dear Dumb Diary based upon the Scholastic book, with the Civil Rights era drama The Watsons Go to Birmingham premiering next.

=== Seasonal programming ===
Hallmark Channel is known for scheduling themed programming around major holidays such as Christmas, Mother's Day, and Valentine's Day—including new original movies relevant to said holiday, in addition to the prime wedding season in the month of June. With the introduction of its "Countdown to Christmas" branding in 2009, the channel gradually expanded the number of seasonal programming events it holds. By 2016, the network had divided its schedule into themed "seasons" year-round, with original programming aligned with these themes. Crown Media's then-CEO Bill Abbott explained that this strategy allowed the network to be positioned as "a year-round destination for celebrations", which need not depend on a single series or franchise to bolster its viewership. This programming strategy also creates synergies with Hallmark Cards.

- "New Year New Movies!" is broadcast in January; it features movies with a winter theme, but not necessarily tied to the Christmas and holiday season (as with Countdown to Christmas). The event was previously known as "Winterfest" from 2016 to 2020.
- "Loveuary", formerly "Countdown To Valentine's Day" (2015–2019) and "Love Ever After" (2020–2021), is broadcast in February. In 2015, the event was 15 days long with four original movie premieres.
- "Spring into Love", formerly "Spring Fling" and "Spring Fever", is broadcast in March and April.
- "Countdown to Summer" was a one time event with 5 movies in May 2020.
- "Summer Nights" (2016–present) is broadcast June through August. In 2017, Summer Nights movies were only shown in August. In 2018 and 2019, Summer Nights movies were shown in July and August. In 2020, there were only three Summer Nights movies in August to go along with the five Countdown to Summer movies in May. In 2021, Summer Nights movies were split up into 2 parts, with the first part being all in June, then taking over a month break, with the second part starting the last week of July, going through all of August, and ending the first week of September.
- "June Weddings" (2017–2019) was broadcast in June. It was on hiatus on Hallmark Channel starting in 2020, and made its return in 2023.
- "Fall Harvest" (2015–present) airs during September and most of October, primarily airing autumn-themed movies (sometimes relating to Halloween). In 2016 and 2019, Fall Harvest movies only aired in October.
- "Five Nights Stuffed Full of Original Holiday Movies" (2015–present), which airs near Thanksgiving.

==== Countdown to Christmas ====
From the last weekend in October until January 1, Hallmark Channel runs an event known as the Countdown to Christmas, where the network's schedule is devoted to a mix of holiday movies, specials and holiday-themed original programming. The block is branded as Countdown to New Years from December 26 until January 1 and culminates with the channel's broadcast of the Tournament of Roses Parade. Actresses frequently featured in the channel's Christmas films have been promoted as the "Queens of Christmas", including Rachel Boston, Candace Cameron Bure, Lacey Chabert, Erin Krakow, Kellie Martin, Danica McKellar, Autumn Reeser and Alicia Witt. Hallmark's "Christmas TV ratings system" has designations like "F for Family" and "J for Joy".

The event was introduced in 2009, featuring four original movie premieres. Countdown to Christmas has featured cross-promotion of Hallmark Cards, including having featured the characters of Hoops & Yoyo in promotions, and airing Jingle All the Way—a half-hour animated Christmas special featuring the character of Jingle the Husky Pup—in 2011, which marked the first Hallmark Channel original production to be a collaboration with a Hallmark Cards property. By 2013, the event featured 12 new movies.

Since 2012, the network has held a Christmas in July event with airings of past Hallmark Channel Christmas movies, which is used to promote Hallmark Cards' collectibles for the upcoming season. In 2013, the event included holiday tips from the cast of Home & Family. In 2014, the event added a theatrical movie premiere. By 2015, the event included one new original movie.

In 2014, Hallmark Channel and Hallmark Cards collaborated for the first time on a movie, Northpole, which was shown during Countdown to Christmas. The 2014 movie Christmas Under Wraps, starring Candace Cameron Bure, became the highest-rated premiere in Hallmark Channel history, with 5.8 million viewers; the success prompted Hallmark Channel to further increase its production of original movies. During the 2017 holiday season, Hallmark Channel premiered 33 original Christmas holiday films, up from a total of 28 holiday movies in 2016. As of 2017, Hallmark had a total of 136 Christmas holiday-themed movies in their original library of films. That year, it introduced the Christmas in Evergreen franchise, which was based on a Hallmark greeting card line.

For 2018, a satellite radio companion to the event was carried on SiriusXM—"Hallmark Channel Radio"—which carried Christmas music hosted by Hallmark Channel talent (such as Holly Robinson Peete and Lacey Chabert), and behind-the-scenes features relating to Countdown to Christmas programming. In honor of the franchise's 10th anniversary, Countdown to Christmas movies aired on Friday nights throughout 2019, and a "Hallmark Channel Christmas Con" was held in Edison, New Jersey in November 2019, featuring appearances by Hallmark Channel talent.

=== Animal special franchise ===
With the success of the Dog Hero Awards, the channel started a franchise out of the show with additional shows that counterprogram major sporting events. Beyond the Dog Hero Awards and the Kitten Bowl, the channel has the Paw-Star Game (counterprogramming the MLB All-Star Game) and the Summer Kitten Games (which had its first edition counterprogram the 2016 Summer Olympics in Rio de Janeiro). On February 2, 2014, the Hallmark Channel partnered with New York's North Shore Animal League and Last Hope Animal Rescue to debut the Kitten Bowl during Super Bowl XLVIII. The event – hosted by Beth Stern and announcers John Sterling and Mary Carillo – is designed as counterprogramming to the Super Bowl and airs during the game's halftime show, and is similar to another animal-themed event that debuted nine years earlier on Animal Planet, the Puppy Bowl. Kitten Bowl II returned on February 1, 2015, and was watched by 1.3 million viewers. A new Kitten Bowl has aired every year since, running repeatedly on Super Bowl Sunday in a three-hour program that includes "playoff games". In 2019, the first edition of the Cat Bowl was shown during that year's Super Bowl. The eighth and last edition of the Kitten Bowl aired in 2021 as Hallmark canceled it the next year.

=== Content standards ===
The Hallmark Channel has been criticized for editing its programming to remove what its Standards and Practices department considers offensive words. After the word "God" was muted in April 2014 from the film It Could Happen to You, in what is described as an attempt "to avoid taking His name in vain", the practice backfired when viewers interpreted the muting as evidence of hatred for God. Blogger Donna Cavanagh criticized the channel's content policies in July 2011, describing them as "censorship at its worst", with removal of profanities or epithets such as "ass" and "hooker". In response to Cavanagh's inquiry, a representative of the network wrote:

Crown Media Networks is committed to family friendly programming. Our Standards & Practices ("S&P" — the things that are or are not acceptable for a particular network) are very conservative. There are words and phrases commonly used on other cable channels and broadcast networks that Hallmark Channel's S&P guidelines deem unacceptable.

Cavanagh accused the network of hypocrisy in deeming such material as being objectionable according to the network's standards, while continuing to acquire off-network sitcoms such as Frasier and The Golden Girls, which often feature sexual content including references to promiscuity. Others have recommended the channel's late night programming, while noting that the word removal from these programs "puts a mild damper on the fun."

== International versions ==
Hallmark Channel operated several cable channels in various international markets; they were sold in 2005 to Sparrowhawk Media, which was in turn acquired by Universal Networks International in 2007.

Universal's licensing agreement ended in July 2011; the networks were either shut down, or rebranded under another NBC Universal-owned brand (such as Diva Universal, Studio Universal, 13th Street Universal or Universal Channel). In the United Kingdom, the Hallmark Original Movies originally shown on the channel are now shown on Movies 24, a sister to the Hallmark Channel.

On October 25, 2018, Corus Entertainment announced that W Network would become the exclusive Canadian broadcaster of Hallmark Channel original series and films beginning November 1. The agreement includes branded blocks of Hallmark Channel programming, and airings of seasonal events such as Countdown to Christmas (which launched the agreement).

== See also ==
- List of Hallmark Hall of Fame episodes
