= Aladdin Theater =

The Historic Cocoa Village Playhouse
- Aladdin Theater, State Theater, Fine Arts Theater, Cocoa Village Playhouse
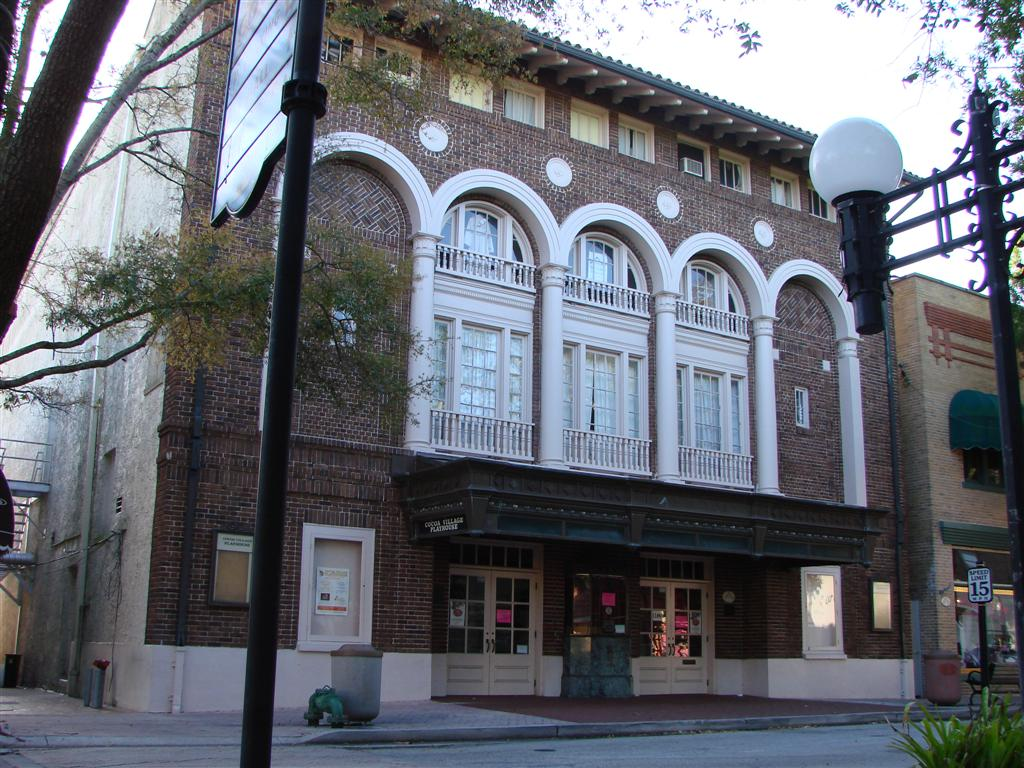
- Interactive map of The Historic Cocoa Village Playhouse
- Address: 300 Brevard Avenue; Cocoa, Florida; United States
- Owner: City of Cocoa
- Operator: The Historic Cocoa Village Playhouse
- Type: Community theatre

Construction
- Opened: 1924
- Reopened: 1990

Website
- www.cocoavillageplayhouse.com
- Aladdin Theater
- U.S. National Register of Historic Places
- Location within Florida Location within the United States
- Coordinates: 28.355307°N 80.72601°W
- NRHP reference No.: 91001541
- Added to NRHP: October 17, 1991

The Aladdin Theater (also known as The Historic Cocoa Village Playhouse) is an historic theater in Cocoa, Florida, United States. It is located at 300 Brevard Avenue and originally opened its doors on August 18, 1924. On October 17, 1991, it was added to the U.S. National Register of Historic Places.

Brevard Community College owned the theater from 1985 to 2010. In the mid-eighties, the college had rescued the theater from a dilapidated state. In 2010 the college offered ownership to the city of Cocoa. The theater has its own board of directors.

The annual budget for 2009 was about $263,000.

== History ==
In 1924 the Aladdin Theater first started showing silent movies and live acts. It was built for $80,000. The Sparks Theater chain purchased the Aladdin in 1939 and changed its name to the "State Theater."

The Kent Theater Chain purchased the building in 1960 and renamed it the Fine Arts Theater.

Subsequently, the city of Cocoa bought the building and renamed it the Cocoa Village Playhouse. The city sold it to Brevard Community College for $1 in 1984. Through donations, and grants, the building was restored from 1985 through 1989. In 1990, the playhouse began staging community based musicals.

The theater was heavily featured in the 1993 film Matinee, where it portrayed the fictional Key West Strand Theater. The film, set during the Cuban Missile Crisis, starred John Goodman.

In 2007, a $2.8 million annex was started.

In 2011, the building was returned to the city of Cocoa.

In 2012, there were 50,000 paying customers annually.

In 2016, the Historic Cocoa Village Playhouse purchased the historic R.M. Rembert Building located next door at 304 Brevard Avenue.
