= Porcher House =

- U.S. National Register of Historic Places
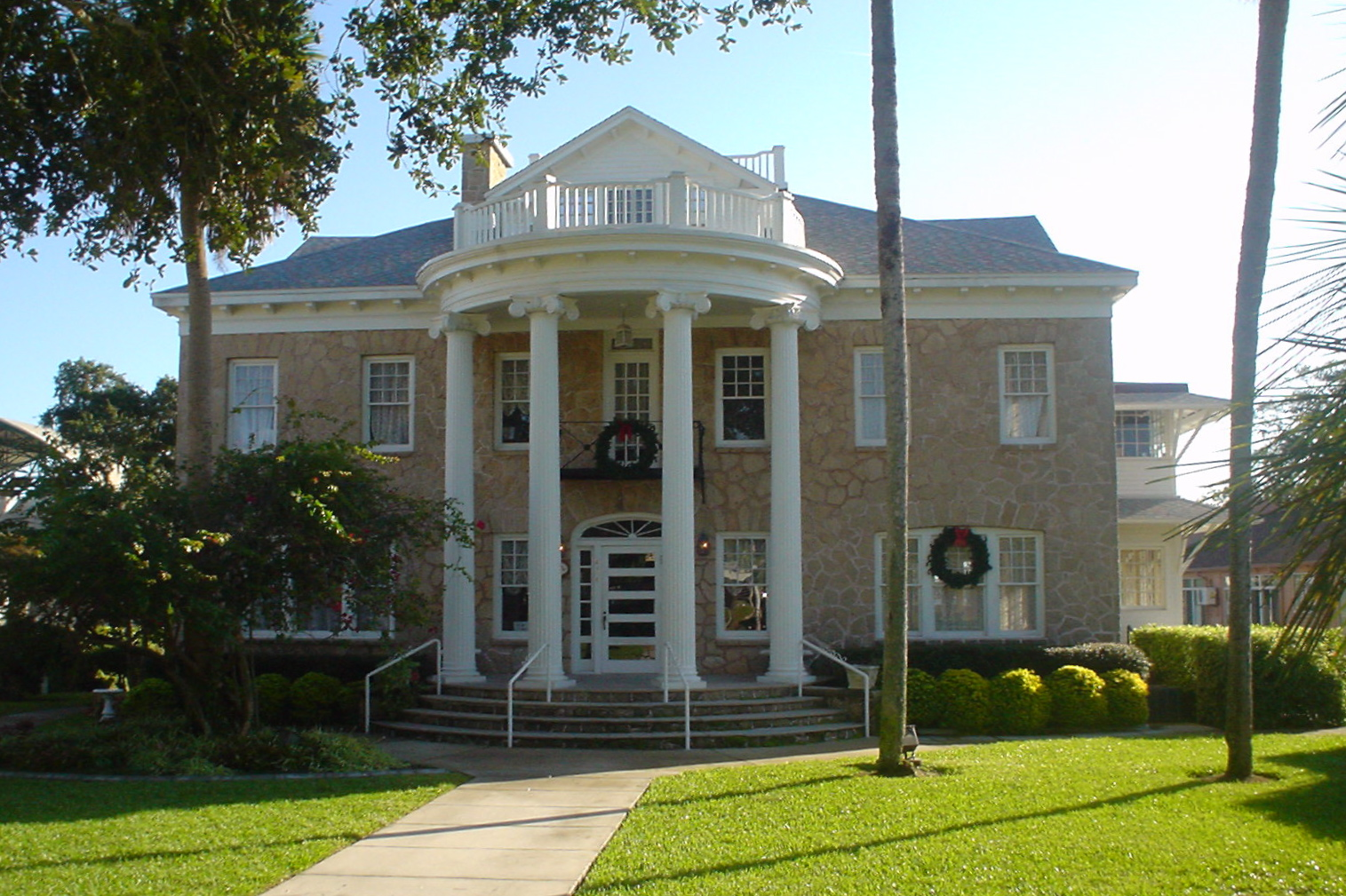

- Location within Florida Location within the United States
- Location: Cocoa, Florida
- Coordinates: 28°21′45″N 80°43′32″W
- Architectural style: Classical Revival
- NRHP reference No.: 86000023
- Added to NRHP: January 6, 1986

The Porcher House is a historic home in Cocoa, Florida. It is located at 434 Delannoy Avenue. On January 6, 1986, it was added to the U.S. National Register of Historic Places.

Built in 1916 by Edward Postell Porcher as a home for his wife, Byrnina M. Peck, the historic house is an excellent example of 20th century classical revival architecture, adapted to the Florida climate. The ten bedroom house is composed of native coquina rock, and finished in the interior with teak, oak, and cedar. In the 1950s, the city of Cocoa obtained the house from the Porcher family and turned it into the City Hall. It is currently rented out for special occasions.

Porcher was a pioneer in the citrus industry and is credited with being the first to wash, grade and inspect fruit. His wife was the first postmistress of Merritt Island.
