= Cocoa, Florida =

City in Florida, US

- City
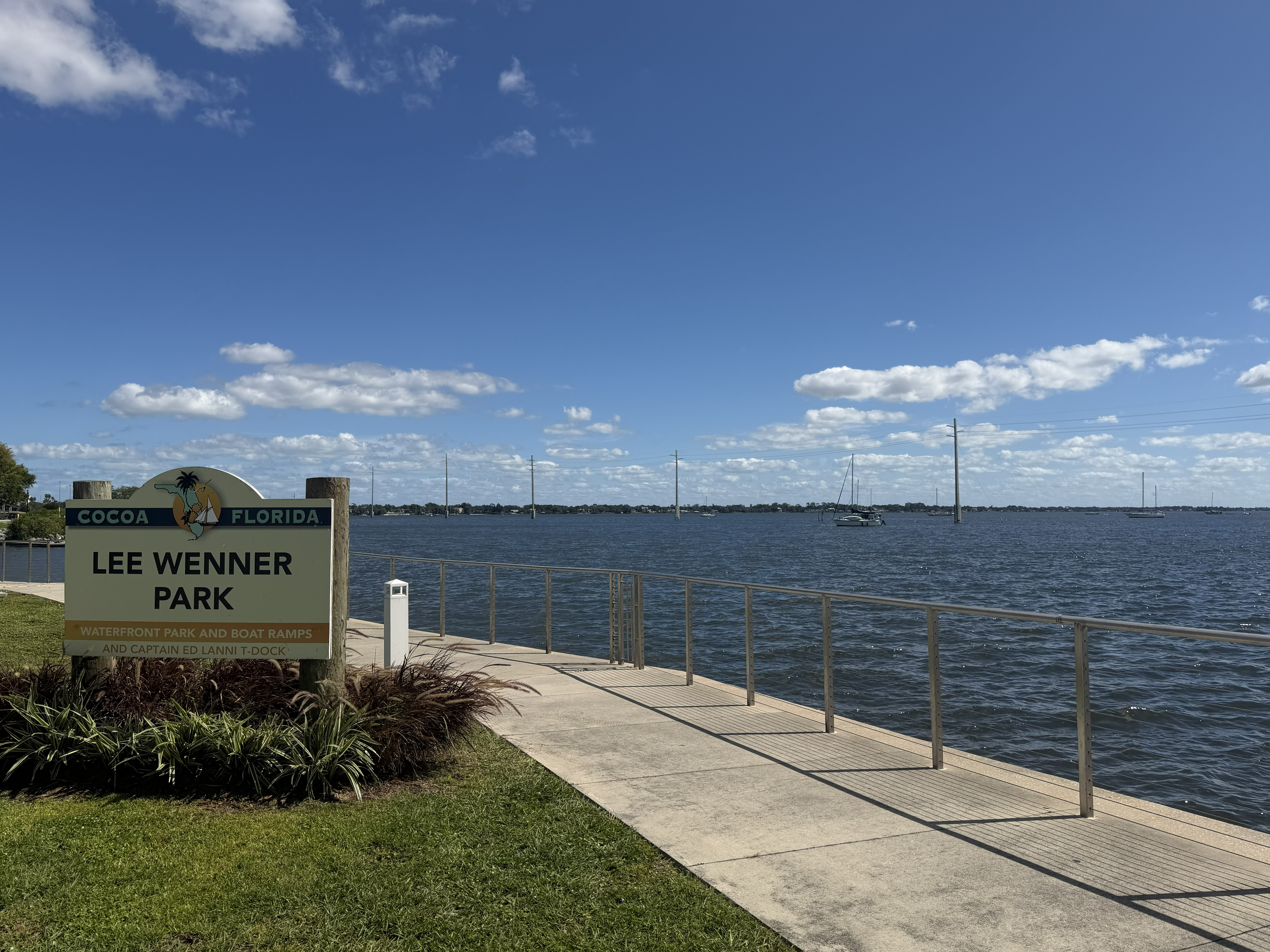
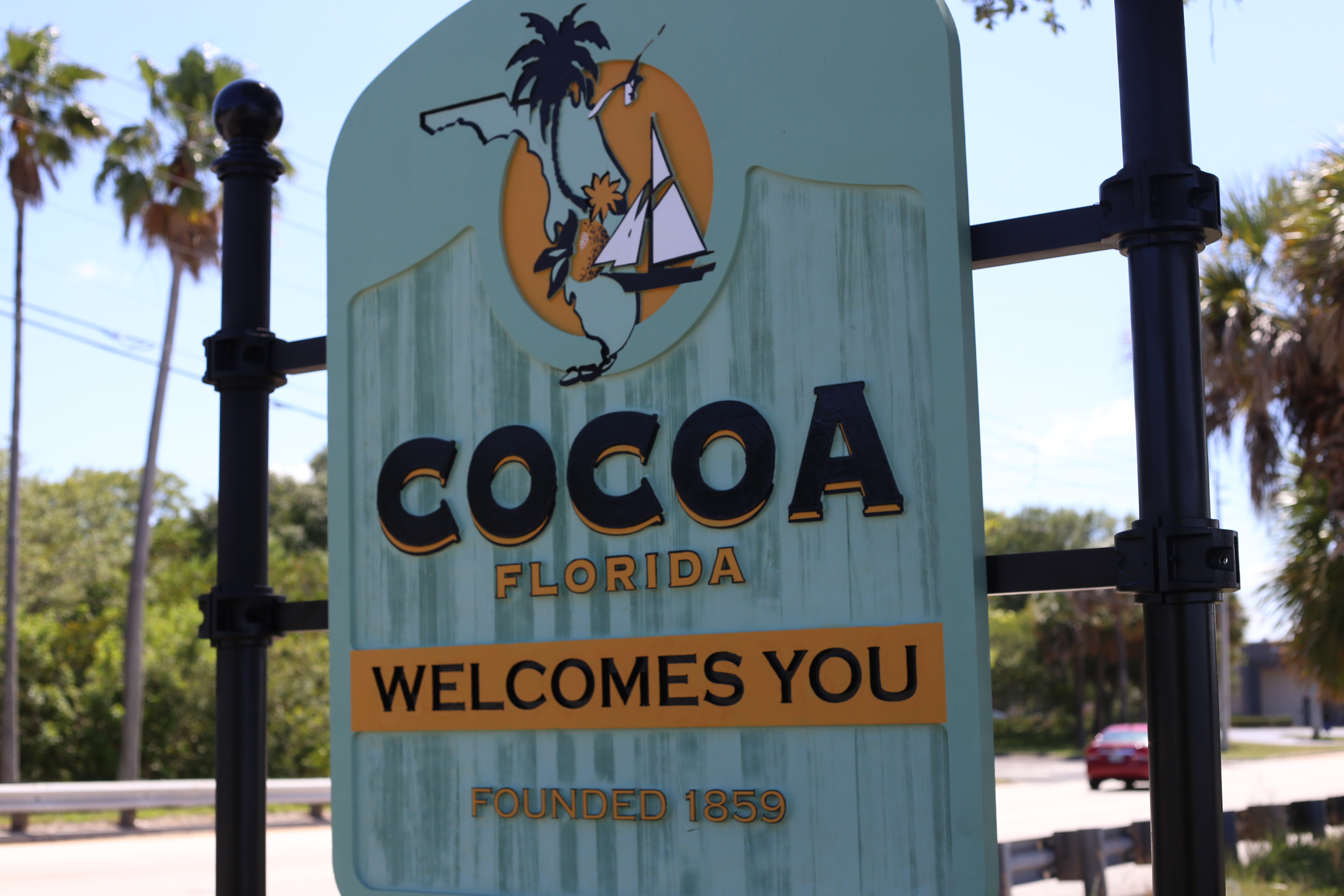
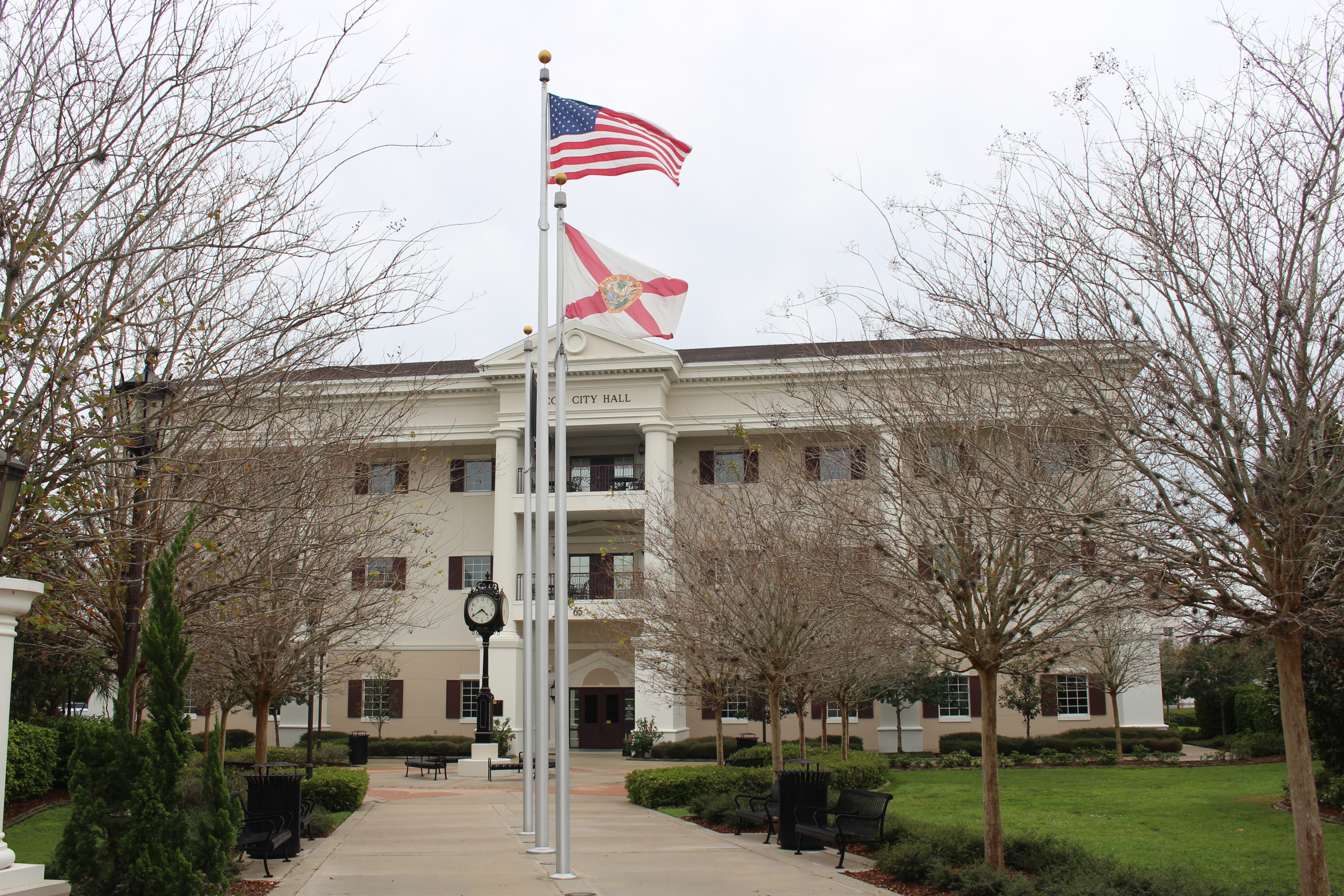
- Top: Downtown Cocoa waterfront; Middle: Cocoa welcome sign; Bottom: Cocoa City Hall

- Seal

- Location in Brevard County and the state of Florida
- Coordinates: 28°22′10″N 80°44′38″W
- Country: United States of America
- State: Florida
- County: Brevard

Government
  - Type: Council-Manager
  - Mayor: Michael Blake
  - City Manager: Stockton Whitten

Area
  - Total: 14.75 sq mi (38.21 km^{2})
  - Land: 13.73 sq mi (35.57 km^{2})
  - Water: 1.02 sq mi (2.64 km^{2})
- Elevation: 36 ft (11 m)

Population (2020)
  - Total: 19,041
  - Density: 1,386.5/sq mi (535.32/km^{2})
- Time zone: UTC−5 (Eastern (EST))
  - Summer (DST): UTC−4 (EDT)
- Area code: 321
- FIPS code: 12-13150
- GNIS feature ID: 0280608
- Website: www.cocoafl.gov

Cocoa is a city in Brevard County, Florida, United States. Its population was 19,041 at the 2020 United States census, up from 17,140 at the 2010 census. It is part of the Palm Bay-Melbourne-Titusville, Florida Metropolitan Statistical Area.

== History ==
=== Etymology ===
Several stories circulate among Cocoa old timers as to how the town got its name. One story says that the mail used to come by river boat and was placed in an empty tin box labeled Baker's Cocoa. The box was nailed to a piling in the river next to downtown. Additionally, an early hotel in the area, located on the Indian River Lagoon, was named Cocoa House. Another story speaks of an elderly African-American woman who lived on the banks of the Indian River. She would supply hot cocoa to sailors traversing the Indian River. The sailors approaching her house were said to yell out "Cocoa!, Cocoa!", alerting the woman that they were present and wanted the beverage.

=== 19th century ===
In 1885, the S. F. Travis Hardware store opened. As of 2026, the business remains open. Cocoa's business district was mostly destroyed by fire in 1890, but significant development soon was stimulated by the extension of the Jacksonville, St. Augustine, and Indian River Railway to Cocoa.

The city was chartered on October 1, 1895. In the winter of 1894–1895, Cocoa had an economic setback when the "Great Freeze" destroyed the citrus crop and forced many citrus workers to seek new jobs. By 1903, the population of Cocoa had declined to 382.

=== Early 20th century ===
In the 1910s, population growth in Cocoa accelerated. The state business directory of 1911–1912 stated the population was 550. In October 1918, the mayor of Cocoa proclaimed that all places of assembly, including schools, churches, and movies, be closed to avoid spreading the Spanish flu. By 1925, its population was estimated at 1,800. By 1930, despite the Great Depression, the population had risen to 2,200.

=== World War II and beyond ===
The population rose dramatically following the development of the space industry, quadrupling from 3,098 in 1940 to 12,244 in 1960. Cocoa and the surrounding area also became integrated with the tourist industry for the first time, as thousands visited the area to witness the launches from Cape Canaveral. By 1980, the city's population had grown to 16,096.

Education was segregated until the 1960s, when Monroe High School and elementary schools for black students were closed.

In 1964, the Cocoa Expo Sports Center (Cocoa Stadium) was built for the Colt 45s spring baseball training and Grapefruit League games. The team later became the Houston Astros. In the early 1980s, the city attempted to upgrade the stadium by asking the Astros to pay for needed repairs. In 1985, the team responded by moving its training to Osceola County Stadium in Kissimmee. As a result, future negotiations with major league teams would be done by the county government.

Clearlake Middle School was closed in 2013. Students were moved to Cocoa High School, which was converted to a junior and senior high school.

== Government ==
Cocoa first approved the council-manager form of government in 1959, and subsequent changes to the state statutes mirrored the City of Cocoa's plan. The city council serves as the board of directors for the city, with the mayor as chairman. The city manager serves as the chief executive. The city council for the City of Cocoa is made up of five members; the mayor is elected at large and the four council members are elected by each of their districts.

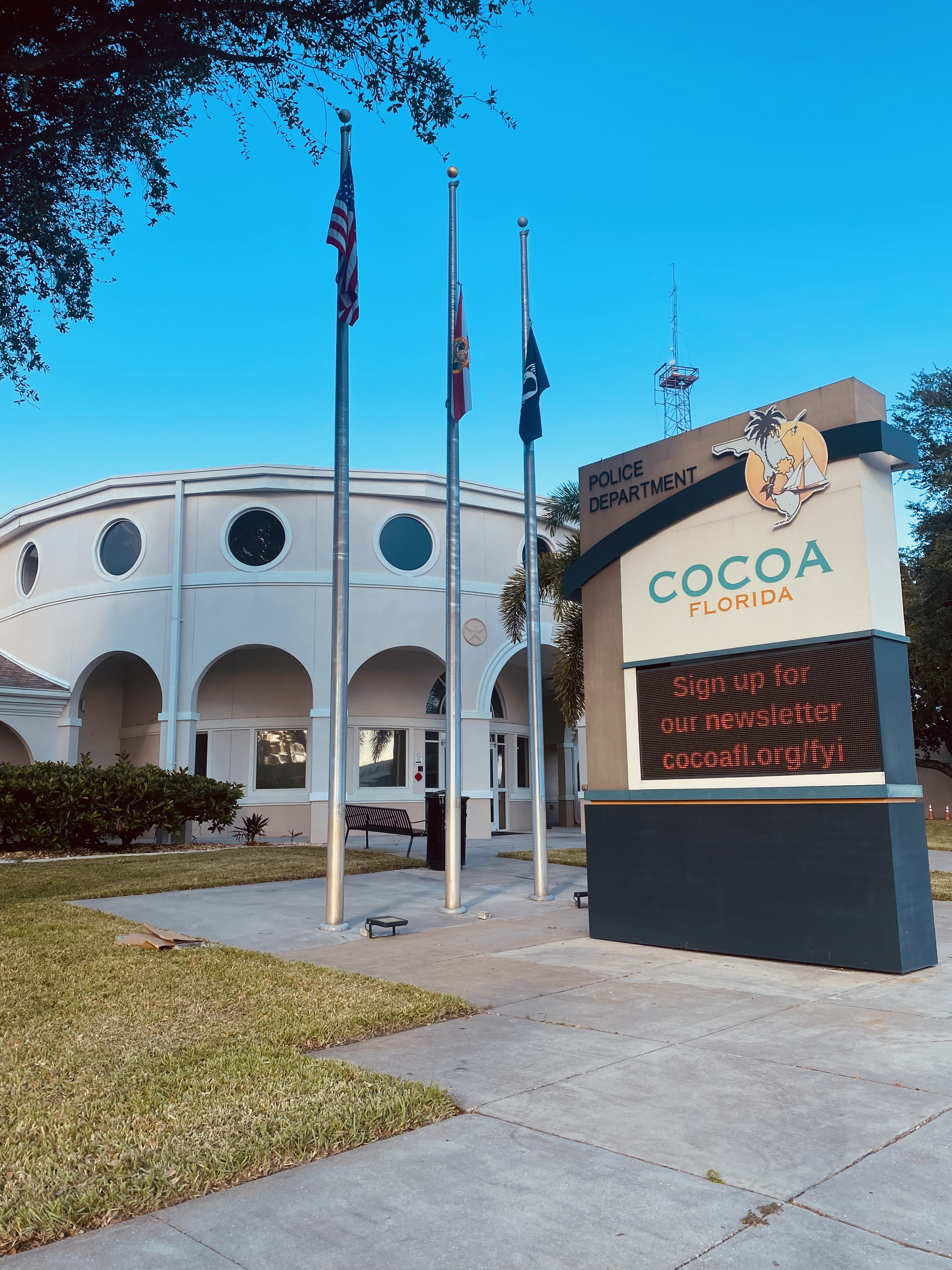
Entrance to the Cocoa Police Department, as seen from King Street

- Mayor – Michael C. Blake
- Councilman, District 1 – Alex Goins
- Councilman, District 2 – Lavander Hearn
- Councilman, District 3 – Matthew Barringer (appointed, upon resignation of previous councilman)
- Councilwoman, District 4 – Lorraine Koss
- City Manager (appointed) – Stockton Whitten

In 2007, the city had a taxable real-estate base of $1.18 billion.

Cocoa has its own police and fire departments. The Cocoa Police Department is the primary law enforcement agency within the city. It is aided by the Brevard County Sheriff's Office, for court and civil process. The Cocoa Fire Department has three stations. Brevard County Fire Rescue also has a station within the city limits. In 2021, the city had an authorized police force of 72 police officers and 44 firefighters.

== Geography ==
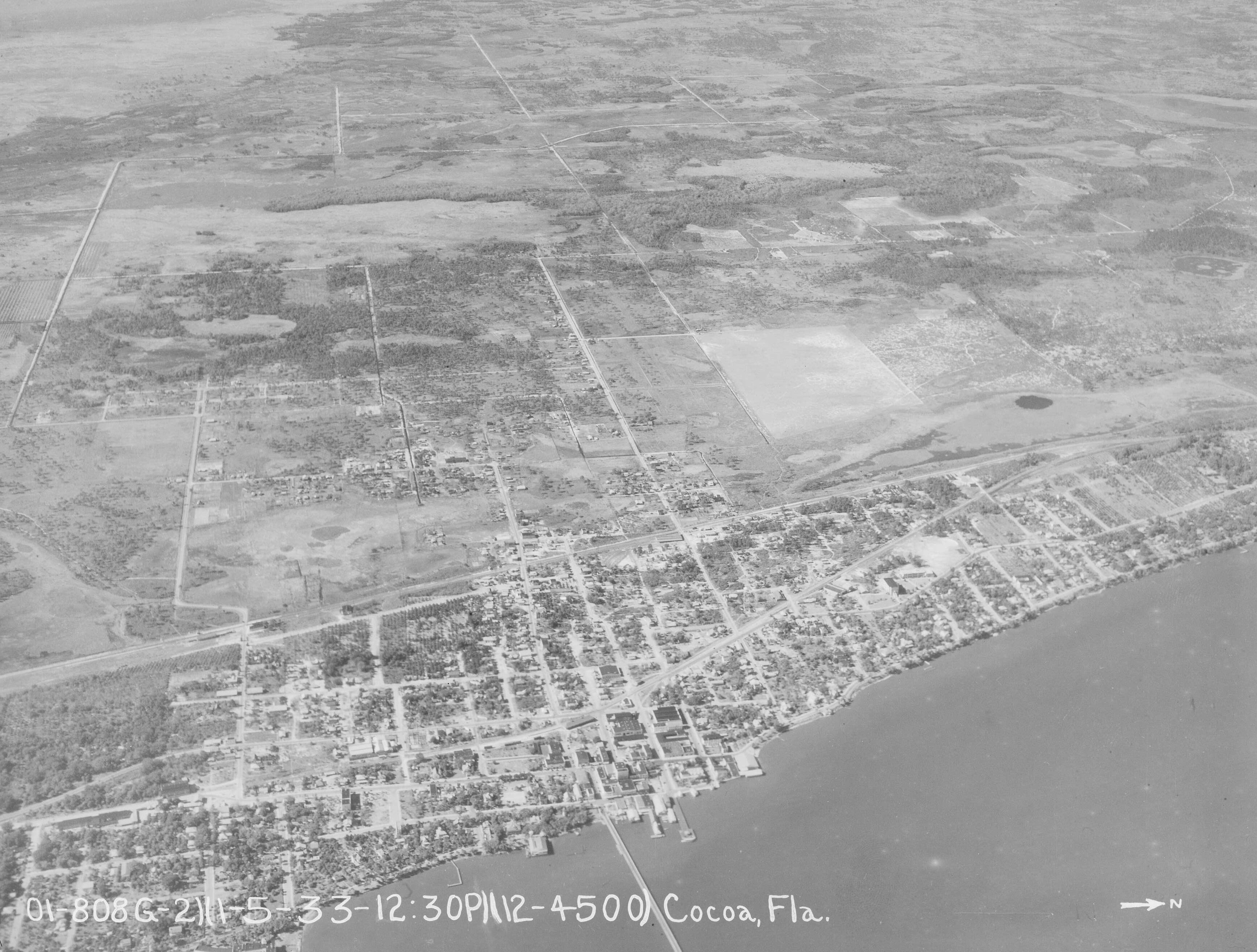
Cocoa in 1933

Cocoa is located at 28°22′10″N 80°44′38″W.

According to the United States Census Bureau, the city has a total area of 15.4 square miles (39.9 km^{2}), 2.1 square miles (5.4 km^{2}) (13.46%) are covered by water. Cocoa is home to the highest point in Brevard County, listed by the USGS as being 83 feet (25 m) above sea level at its apex.

=== Fauna ===
The Cocoa Bird Count has annually counted species of birds in or near Cocoa since 1950. In 2010, it counted 150 species. An annual "Christmas Bird Count" was conducted before this, starting in 1900.

=== Climate ===
Climate data for Cocoa, FL
Month	Jan	Feb	Mar	Apr	May	Jun	Jul	Aug	Sep	Oct	Nov	Dec	Year
Record high °F (°C)	91 (33)	92 (33)	94 (34)	97 (36)	102 (39)	103 (39)	108 (42)	101 (38)	101 (38)	99 (37)	93 (34)	88 (31)	108 (42)
Mean maximum °F (°C)	86 (30)	88 (31)	91 (33)	94 (34)	98 (37)	100 (38)	100 (38)	99 (37)	97 (36)	93 (34)	89 (32)	86 (30)	100 (38)
Mean daily maximum °F (°C)	70 (21)	73 (23)	77 (25)	81 (27)	86 (30)	87 (31)	92 (33)	91 (33)	89 (32)	84 (29)	78 (26)	70 (21)	82 (28)
Daily mean °F (°C)	60 (16)	63 (17)	68 (20)	72 (22)	77 (25)	79 (26)	83 (28)	83 (28)	82 (28)	73 (23)	70 (21)	62 (17)	73 (23)
Mean daily minimum °F (°C)	50 (10)	53 (12)	58 (14)	62 (17)	68 (20)	71 (22)	74 (23)	75 (24)	74 (23)	62 (17)	61 (16)	53 (12)	63 (18)
Mean minimum °F (°C)	25 (−4)	28 (−2)	34 (1)	41 (5)	52 (11)	61 (16)	64 (18)	64 (18)	62 (17)	47 (8)	35 (2)	26 (−3)	25 (−4)
Record low °F (°C)	19 (−7)	23 (−5)	26 (−3)	36 (2)	47 (8)	56 (13)	54 (12)	33 (1)	51 (11)	30 (−1)	27 (−3)	19 (−7)	19 (−7)

== Demographics ==
Historical population
Census	Pop.	Note	%±
1890	312		—
1900	382		22.4%
1910	613		60.5%
1920	1,445		135.7%
1930	2,164		49.8%
1940	3,098		43.2%
1950	4,245		37.0%
1960	12,294		189.6%
1970	16,110		31.0%
1980	16,096		−0.1%
1990	17,722		10.1%
2000	16,412		−7.4%
2010	17,140		4.4%
2020	19,041		11.1%
U.S. Decennial Census

=== Racial and ethnic composition ===
Cocoa racial composition (Hispanics excluded from racial categories) (NH = Non-Hispanic)
Race	Pop 2010	Pop 2020	% 2010	% 2020
White (NH)	9,285	9,449	54.17%	49.62%
Black or African American (NH)	5,253	5,011	30.65%	26.32%
Native American or Alaska Native (NH)	75	41	0.44%	0.22%
Asian (NH)	175	241	1.02%	1.27%
Pacific Islander or Native Hawaiian (NH)	10	16	0.06%	0.08%
Some other race (NH)	38	92	0.22%	0.48%
Multiracial (NH)	373	976	2.18%	5.13%
Hispanic or Latino (any race)	1,931	3,215	11.27%	16.88%
Total	17,140	19,041		

=== 2020 census ===
As of the 2020 census, Cocoa had a population of 19,041. The median age was 42.4 years. 21.3% of residents were under the age of 18 and 20.6% of residents were 65 years of age or older. For every 100 females there were 92.1 males, and for every 100 females age 18 and over there were 89.0 males age 18 and over.

99.9% of residents lived in urban areas, while 0.1% lived in rural areas.

There were 8,206 households in Cocoa, of which 25.8% had children under the age of 18 living in them. Of all households, 32.9% were married-couple households, 22.3% were households with a male householder and no spouse or partner present, and 36.3% were households with a female householder and no spouse or partner present. About 34.3% of all households were made up of individuals and 16.4% had someone living alone who was 65 years of age or older. There were 4,550 families residing in the city.

There were 9,182 housing units, of which 10.6% were vacant. The homeowner vacancy rate was 1.8% and the rental vacancy rate was 9.4%.

Racial composition as of the 2020 census
Race	Number	Percent
White	10,121	53.2%
Black or African American	5,104	26.8%
American Indian and Alaska Native	86	0.5%
Asian	252	1.3%
Native Hawaiian and Other Pacific Islander	22	0.1%
Some other race	1,433	7.5%
Two or more races	2,023	10.6%
Hispanic or Latino (of any race)	3,215	16.9%

=== 2010 census ===
As of the 2010 United States census, 17,140 people, 7,429 households, and 4,480 families resided in the city.

=== 2000 census ===
As of the 2000 census, 16,412 people, 6,939 households, and 4,232 families lived in the city. The population density was 2,200.3 inhabitants per square mile (849.5/km^{2}). The 8,064 housing units had an average density of 1,081.1 units per square mile (417.4 units/km^{2}). The racial makeup of the city was 62.47% White, 32.28% African American, 0.63% Native American, 0.94% Asian, 0.23% Pacific Islander, 1.58% from other races, and 1.87% from two or more races. Hispanics or Latinos of any race were 4.93% of the population.

Of the 6,939 households, 28.4% had children under 18 living with them, 37.0% were married couples living together, 19.2% had a female householder with no husband present, and 39.0% were not families. About 32.0% of all households were made up of individuals, and 11.5% had someone living alone who was 65 or older. The average household size was 2.35 and the average family size was 2.97.

In 2000, in the city, the age distribution was 26.4% under 18, 8.6% from 18 to 24, 29.1% from 25 to 44, 21.6% from 45 to 64, and 14.3% who were 65 or older. The median age was 36 years. For every 100 females, there were 90.5 males. For every 100 females 18 and over, there were 86.4 males.

== Economy ==
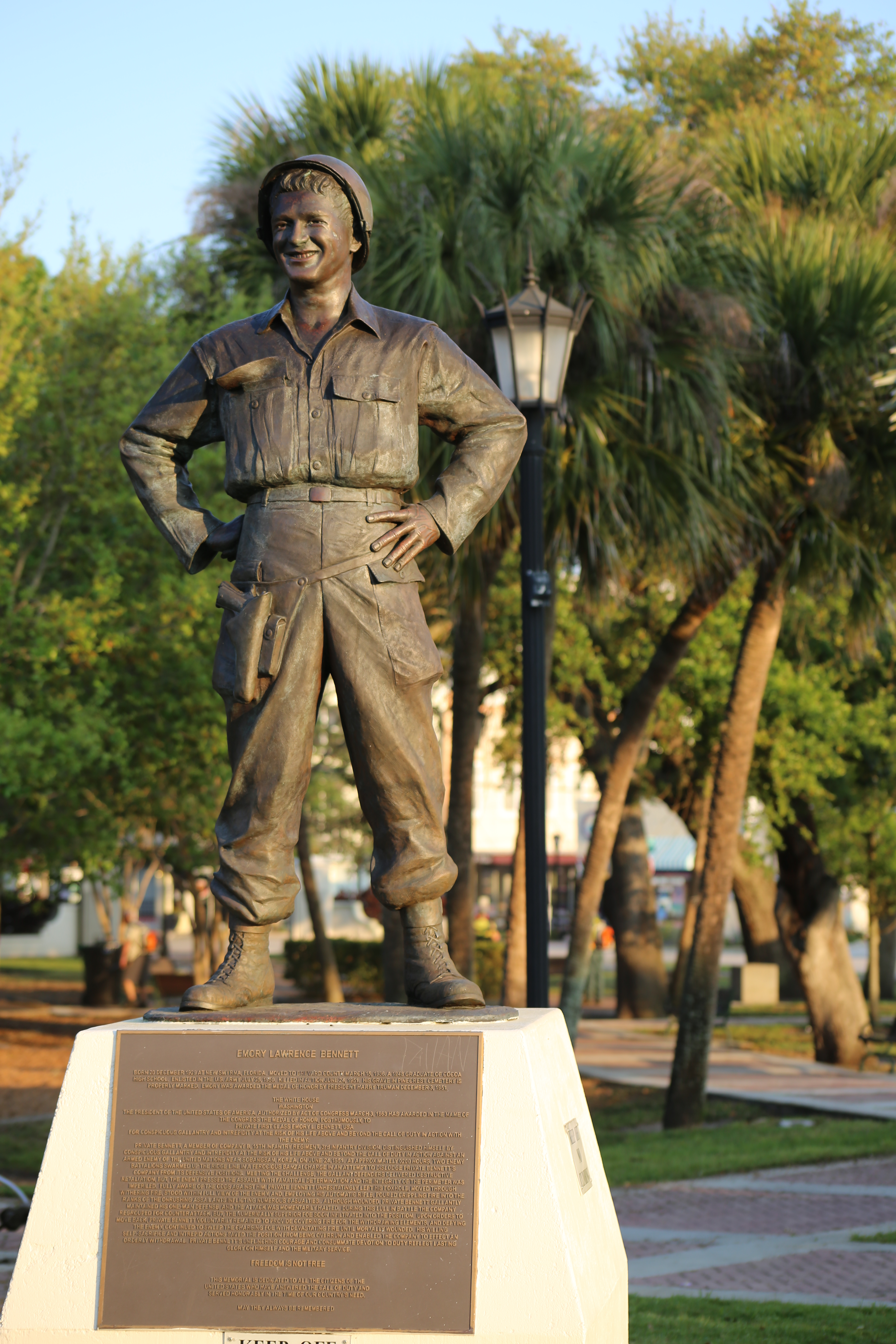
Medal of Honor recipient Emory Bennett's statue in Cocoa Riverfront Park

=== Personal income ===
According to 2020 United States census data:

- Median household income = $45,011
- Per capita income = $26,831
- Below the poverty line: 13.0% of the population

=== Industry ===
Construction and retail trade are the two largest industries by employment in Cocoa as of 2017. In 2008, Kel-Tec CNC Industries, located in Cocoa, was the third-largest manufacturer of pistols in the United States. Cocoa has 1,381 registered businesses that include light manufacturing and industrial, retail, and office businesses as of 2017. Cocoa hosts one of the facilities building SpaceX Starship.

=== Workforce ===
In 2017, 9,633 persons were employed, with 84% having a high school education or higher.

== Tourism ==
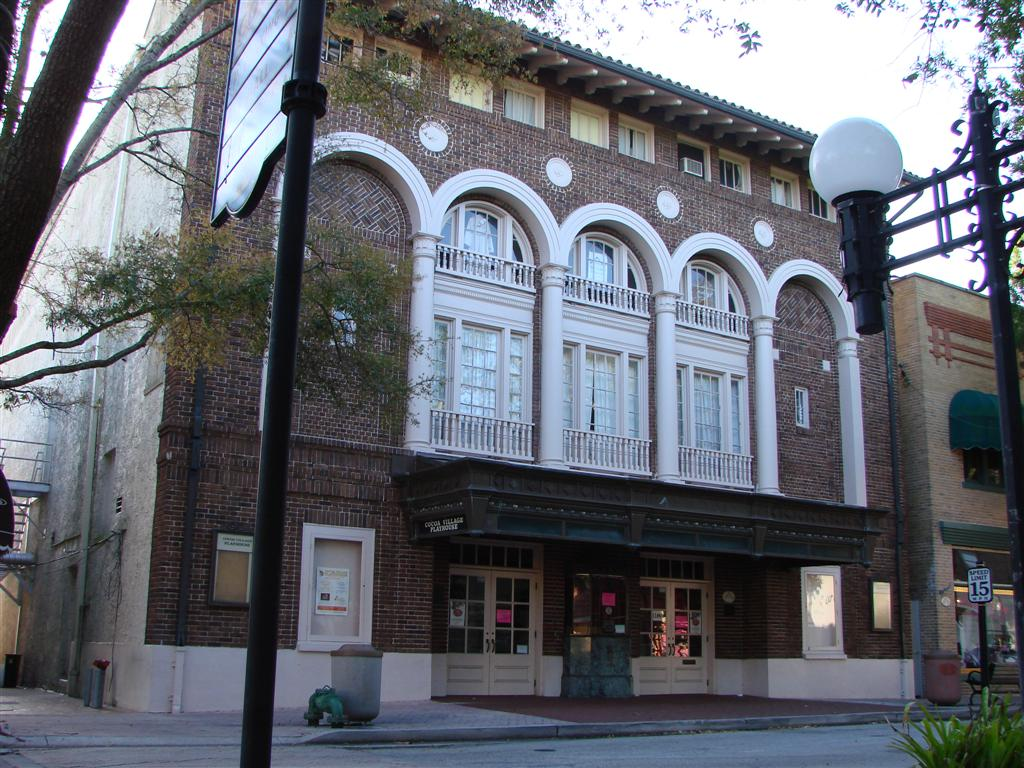
Aladdin Theater (also known as Cocoa Playhouse)

Tourism is high in the downtown historic business district. Cruise passenger tourists come from Port Canaveral on excursions or day trips. In addition, tourists are attracted to the historic sites and local attractions such as the Brevard Museum of History and Natural Science, the Historic Cocoa Village, Indian River Queen (excursion boat), Indian River Drive scenic by-pass, the Aladdin Theater, Historic Porcher House, and Riverfront Park. Historic Cocoa Village has shopping and two Golden Spoon award-winning restaurants, and boutiques. The city sponsors more than 50 special events each year.

=== Cocoa Village ===
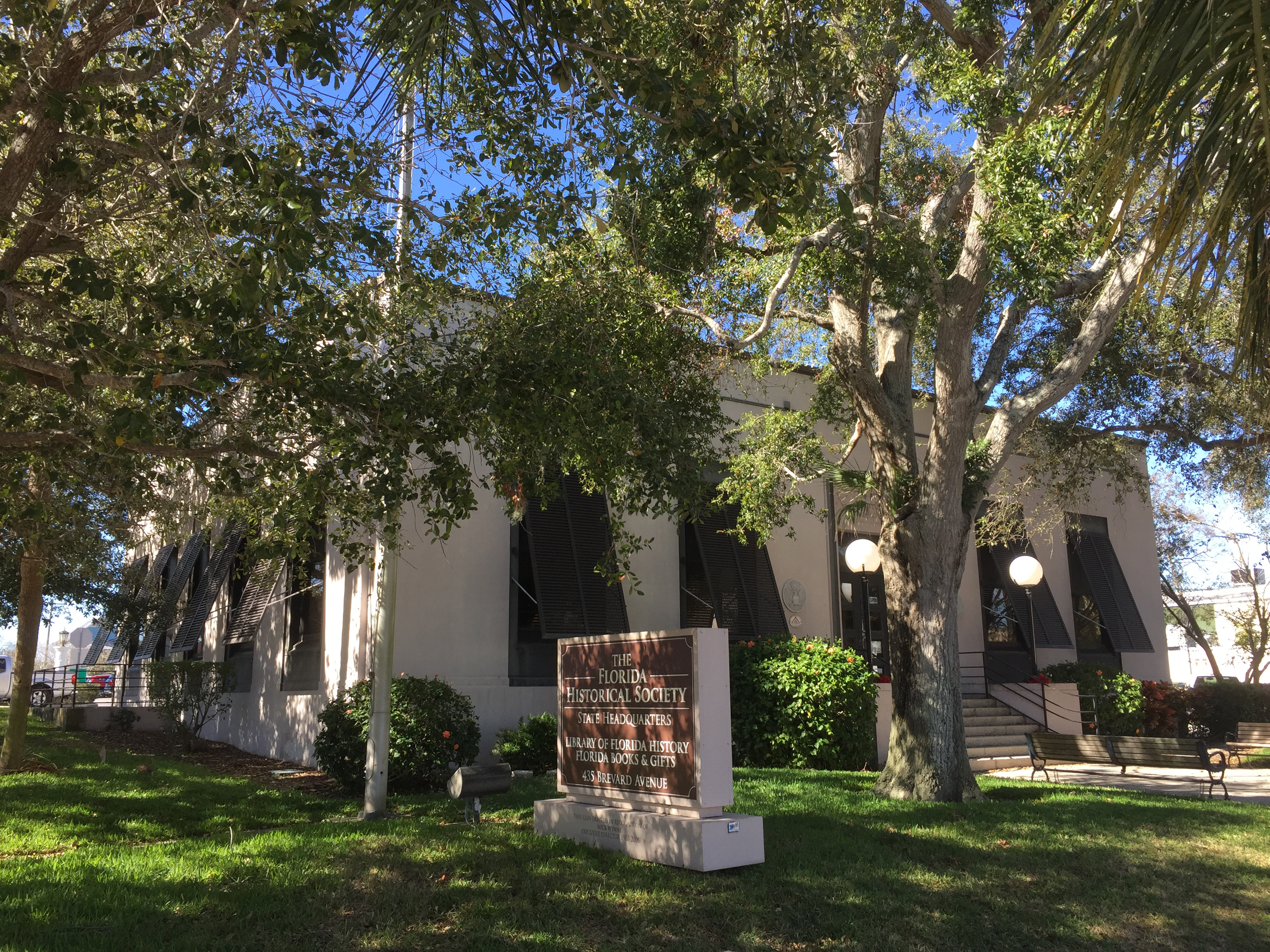
Historic Cocoa Post Office, now the home of the Florida Historical Society State Headquarters

The historic downtown area is called Cocoa Village, situated along Florida Avenue to Stone Street, and stretching to Riverfront Park along the Indian River. It has shops and restaurants, and is surrounded by historic buildings and the Cocoa Riverfront Park. The Florida Historical Society is headquartered in the historic Cocoa Post Office, originally built in 1939 by the Works Progress Administration. The area was revitalized by funding for public infrastructure through the Cocoa Redevelopment Agency, city, and private investment. Cocoa Village is also home to the Historic Cocoa Village Playhouse, which was originally called The Aladdin Theatre.

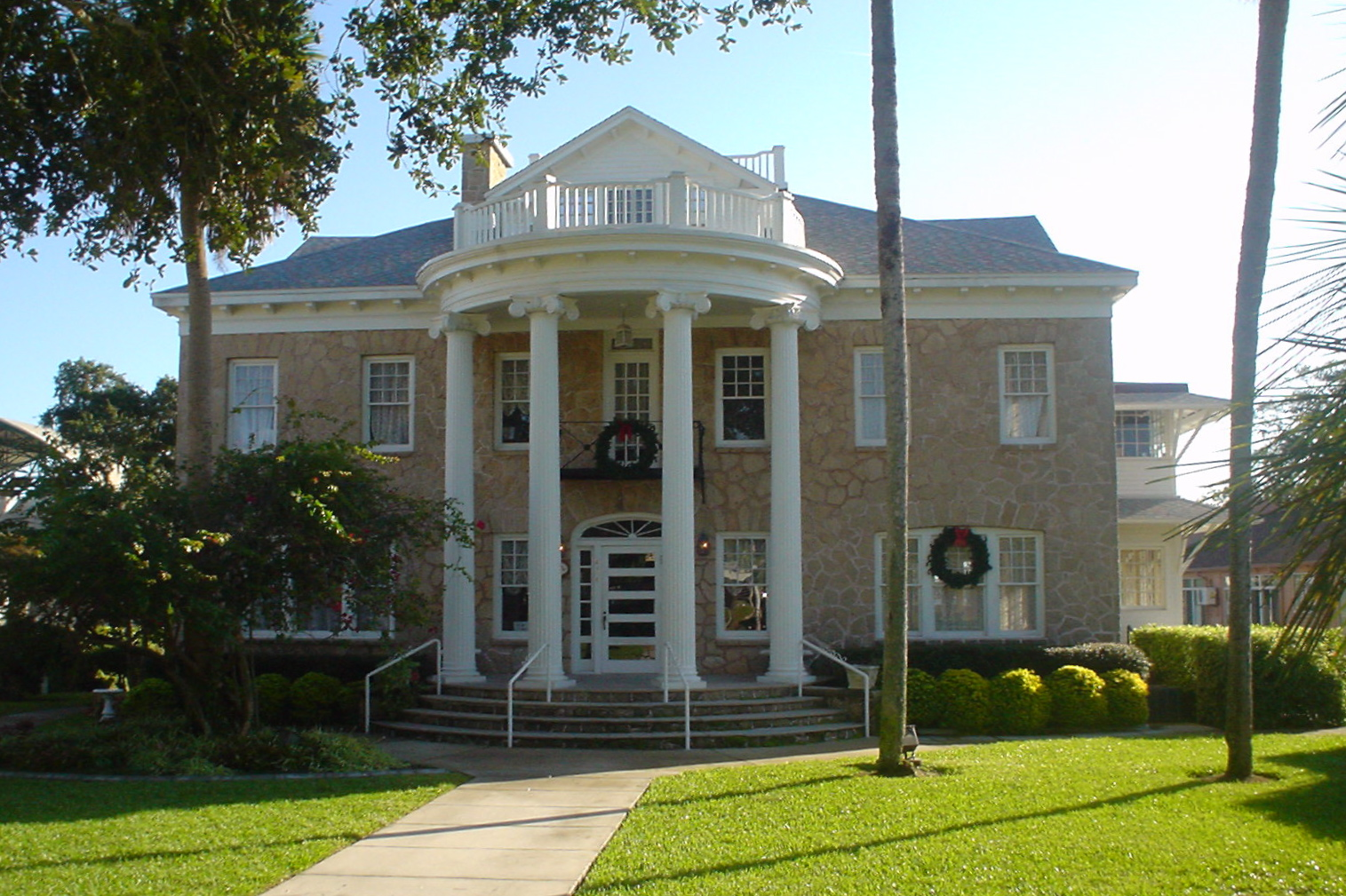
Porcher House in Cocoa Village

== Education ==
The city area has these educational institutions:

Higher education:

- Eastern Florida State College, Cocoa Campus
- University of Central Florida, Cocoa Campus

Public school system:

- Cambridge Elementary School
- Cocoa High School
- Endeavor Elementary Magnet School
- Saturn Elementary School

Private schools:

- Emma Jewel Charter Academy
- St. Mark's Episcopal Academy

== Infrastructure ==
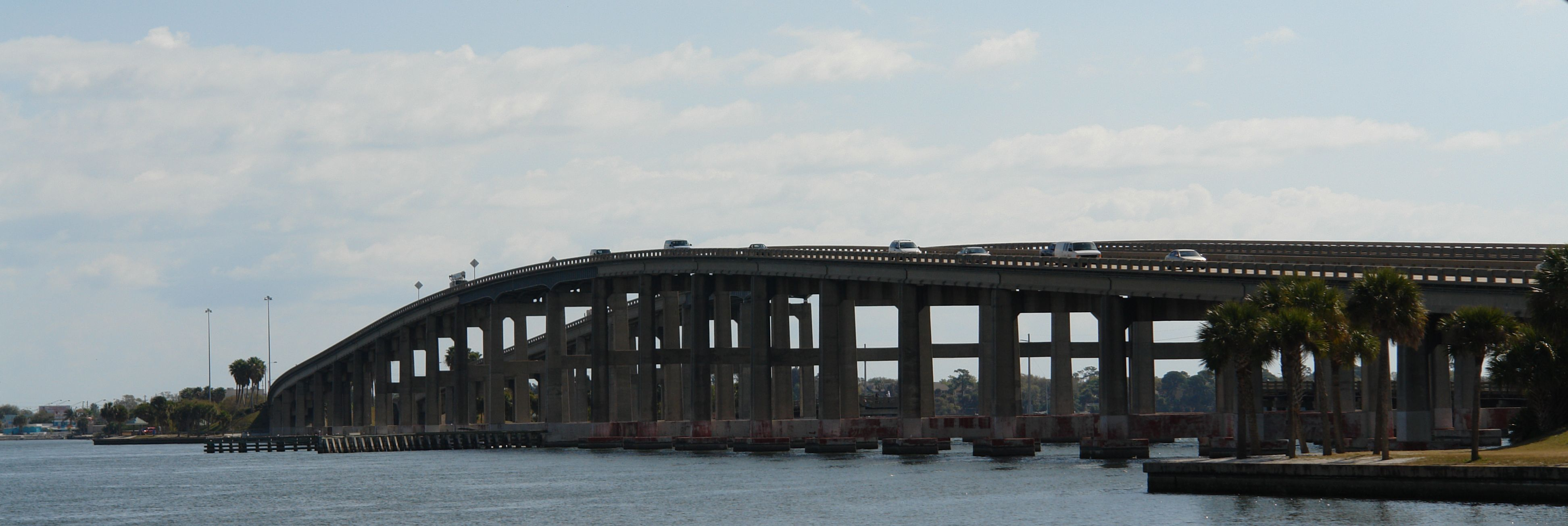
The Hubert H. Humphrey Bridge spans the Indian River Lagoon, linking Cocoa with Merritt Island.

=== Transportation ===
==== Major roads ====
All are at least four-lane roads, unless otherwise designated.

- US 1 – This is the main north–south route through the city, known officially as Cocoa Boulevard. From north to south, the road enters Cocoa via the census-designated place Sharpes. The road follows a vaguely northwest–southeast course as it passes through Cocoa Village. Major intersections include SR 528 (diamond interchange), Michigan Avenue, CR 503, and SR 520.
- I-95 – There are three interchanges within city limits: SR 520 (exit 201), SR 524 (exit 202), and SR 528 (exit 205).
- SR 501 – This is the secondary north–south road in Cocoa, known locally as Clearlake Road. It runs from SR 524 to SR 520. Major intersections include SR 524, Michigan Avenue, CR 503, Lake Drive, and SR 520.
- CR 503 – This is a minor county road, known locally as Dixon Boulevard, running from SR 501 to US 1. Major intersections include SR 501, Fiske Boulevard and US 1.
- CR 515 – This scenic two-lane county road, known locally as, from north to south, Indian River Drive, Brevard Drive/Delannoy Avenue (south/north), and Rockledge Drive, is a slow residential route running directly parallel to the Indian River. Major intersections include Dixon Boulevard and SR 520 (northbound shares a brief concurrency).
- SR 520 – This is the main east–west route through the city; 25,000 vehicles/day drive through Cocoa Village. Starting from the west, the road enters the city limits of Cocoa from unincorporated Brevard County and takes on the name King Street. It then intersects SR 524. Following a brief interruption from Cocoa West, the road then runs through Cocoa Village on a pair of one-way streets, eastbound named King Street and westbound named Willard Street, and onto the Merritt Island Causeway. Major intersections include SR 524, I-95 (diamond interchange), SR 501, SR 519, US 1, and Indian River Drive.
- SR 524 – This is a rural, sometimes two-lane, secondary road running from SR 520 to SR 528. It has no local name. Major intersections include SR 520, I-95, SR 501, and SR 528.
- SR 528 – This is an east–west highway running from unincorporated areas of the county to the census-designated and unincorporated place of Merritt Island. Major intersections include I-95, SR 524, and US 1.

==== Rail ====
The Florida East Coast Railway runs through Cocoa. Into the early 1960s, passengers could take one of two Chicago-bound trains (on alternating days), the City of Miami or the South Wind (both via Birmingham) and the New York-bound East Coast Champion, Havana Special, and Miamian from the Florida East Coast Railway's Cocoa-Rockledge station. Into the latter 1950s, passengers could take the Dixie Flagler to Chicago via Atlanta from the station. All passenger trains along the FEC were suspended in 1963 due to a strike. The FEC resumed local passenger service between Jacksonville and the Miami area from 1965 until July 31, 1968.

Brightline is an inter-city rail route that currently runs between Miami and Orlando. On March 12, 2024, Brightline officials confirmed that an infill station on the Space Coast would be built in Cocoa.

==== Bus ====
Space Coast Area Transit operates a public bus service in Cocoa and vicinity.

=== Water ===
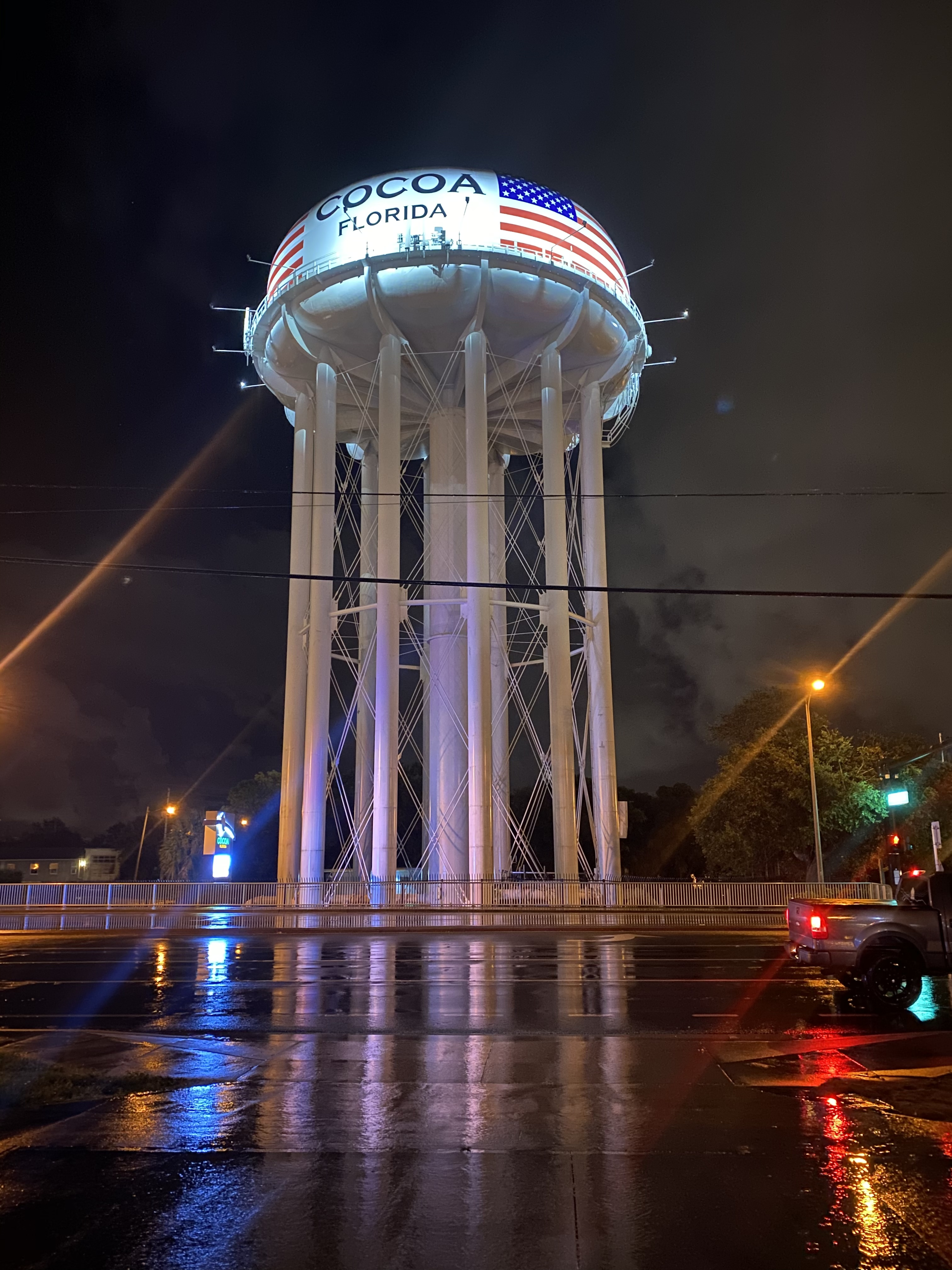
Updated livery of the Cocoa water tower at night, as seen from US Route 1.

Since 1957, Cocoa has supplied the communities of central Brevard County with potable water. Cocoa made major investments in the water supply and treatment facilities needed to produce a sub-regional water system.

In 2017, Cocoa provided an average of 23,000,000 US gallons (87,000,000 L; 19,000,000 imp gal) of water daily to over 80,000 customers (250,000 people) in Cocoa, Rockledge, Port St. John, Merritt Island, Cape Canaveral, Cocoa Beach, Suntree/Viera, Patrick Air Force Base, Kennedy Space Center and Port Canaveral.

Cocoa's water system includes the wellfield and raw water collection system, Wewahootee Water Treatment Plant, transmission mains, and the Dyal Water Treatment Plant (WTP). Cocoa's drinking water sources include the Floridian Aquifer, Intermediate Aquifer, Taylor Creek Reservoir, and Aquifer Storage and Recovery (ASR) wells. All of these facilities are located in east Orange County. A distribution system and storage pumping facilities are located in Brevard County.

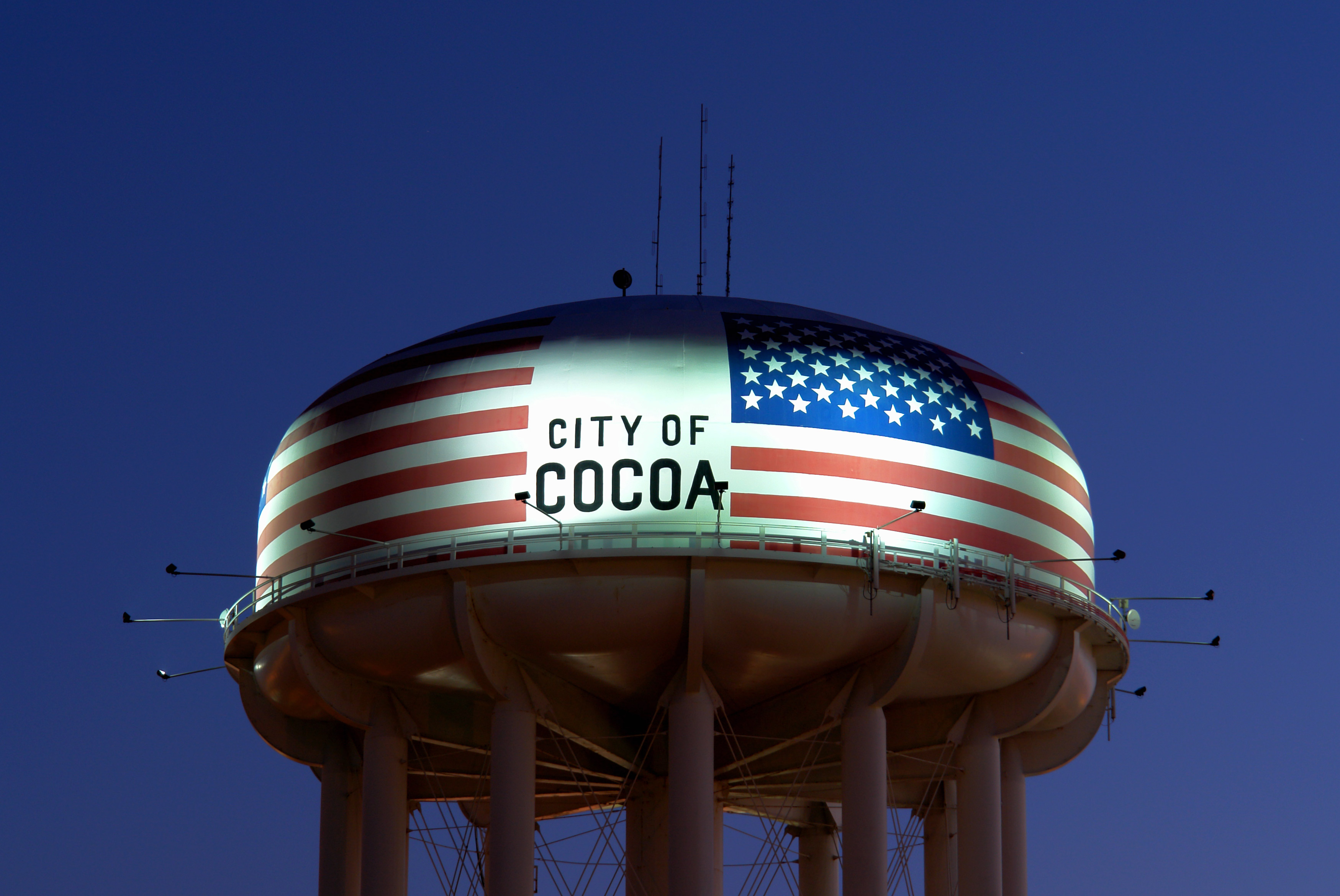
Cocoa water tower in 2009, with the original bicentennial paint scheme.

The Dyal WTP processes about nine billion gallons per year, with peak flows reaching 38 million gallons per day (mgd) during the summer. Daily flows average 25 mgd. The Dyal WTP is unusual for Central Florida because it is capable of treating both ground and surface water.

The flag was originally painted on the water tower free of charge by a Greek immigrant. He wanted to decorate the tower in time for the United States Bicentennial celebration in 1976. In 2014, the city refurbished and repainted the tower with the iconic American flags.

== Media ==
=== Radio stations ===
- WMMV 1350 AM
- WWBC 1510 AM
- WMIE-FM 91.5
- WFLM 93.9 FM
- WRRQ-LP 96.9 FM

=== Television station ===
- WEFS 68, a public television station operated by Eastern Florida State College.

== Points of interest ==
- Florida Solar Energy Center
- Brevard Museum of History & Natural Science
- Alma Clyde Field Library of Florida History

== Historic sites ==
- Community Woman's Club
- Aladdin Theater
- Historic Derby Street Chapel
- Porcher House
- St. Mark's Episcopal Church

== Athletics ==
The Houston Astros held spring training in Cocoa from 1964 through 1984, and the Florida Marlins trained in Cocoa in 1993. Cocoa Stadium was also the long-time home of the Florida State League Cocoa Astros.

In 2009, the Space Coast Surge, a member of the Florida Winter Baseball League, had Cocoa Stadium as its home stadium. The league suspended operations in November 2009.

Cocoa High School has numerous state-champion athletic teams. In 2015, the Cocoa High School football team was ranked 13th in Florida and first in the county, and had a 35-game winning streak against other Brevard County schools.

== Notable people ==
- Emory L. Bennett (1929–1951), United States Army soldier during the Korean War and Medal of Honor recipient. A statue of him is in Cocoa Riverfront Park
- Tarean Folston (born 1995), football player at the University of Notre Dame
- Chauncey "C.J." Gardner-Johnson (born 1997), NFL American football player
- Jumaine Jones (born 1979), professional basketball player
- Chip Skowron (c. 1968), hedge fund portfolio manager, convicted of insider trading
- Abbie Sweetwine (1921–2009), nurse who was called "The Angel of Platform 6" for her work during the Harrow and Wealdstone rail crash
- Scott Thompson (aka; Carrot Top) (born 1965), a 1983 Cocoa High School graduate, is an American stand-up comedian and actor
- Nick Wynne (born 1943) historian, writer, and educator

== Sister city ==
- Beit Shemesh, Israel. On October 7, 2007, the city became a sister city with Beit Shemesh. Eastern Florida State College announced that it would participate by exchanging students.

== See also ==
- Cocoa Police Department
