= The Cowboy Channel =

American cable television network

- Country: United States
- Headquarters: Fort Worth, Texas

Programming
- Language: English
- Picture format: 1080i (HDTV); 480i (SDTV)

Ownership
- Owner: Teton Ridge

History
- Launched: 1979
- Former names: National Christian Network (1979–1986); Liberty Broadcasting Network (1986–1988); FamilyNet (1988–2017)

Links
- Website: Official website

Availability

Streaming media
- Sling TV: Internet Protocol television

The Cowboy Channel is an American cable television network in over 42 million cable and satellite homes, which carries Western programming and rodeo sports. The network was founded in 1979 as the National Christian Network, later took the name FamilyNet in 1988 under the ownership of Jerry Falwell, and then in 2017 was rebranded as The Cowboy Channel.

In November 2024, it was announced that Western sports and entertainment company Teton Ridge had acquired The Cowboy Channel, along with The Cowgirl Channel and their live-streaming and on-demand service, Cowboy Channel+. Until then, the networks were operated by Rural Media Group, which owns RFD-TV.

== History ==
=== As FamilyNet ===
FamilyNet's logo from 2009 until 2017.

The channel was acquired by InTouch Ministries in October 2007 from the Southern Baptist Convention. In December 2009, FamilyNet was acquired by Robert A. Schuller's ComStar Media Fund. In 2010, FamilyNet was spun out into its own company, with Robert A. Schuller as the chairman.

The organization also operated FamilyNet Radio 161, a full-time Christian talk channel on Sirius Satellite Radio, but was discontinued on November 30, 2010; FamilyTalk replaced it.

From 2011 to 2012, the channel showed sitcoms like The Bob Newhart Show, Newhart, and Mr. Belvedere.

On October 24, 2012, Rural TV purchased FamilyNet, and the transaction took effect on January 1, 2013. At first the network was used to carry an all-trading day format of farm and market news, which eventually moved to a reduced timeslot on RFD-TV due to low interest and ratings. Rural Media, which had considered merging RFD-TV and FamilyNet together to gain over-the-air carriage, eventually decided to keep FamilyNet as a separate service, but with a refocus in programming towards classic television programming which was not picked up by competitors MeTV, Antenna TV and Cozi TV. Rural Media also decided not to renew over-the-air contracts with stations in a slow process in order to make it a cable-only network. A number of former FamilyNet affiliates (mainly religious stations) continue to carry programming recorded from the network's feed before the Rural TV sale, seemingly under a perpetual license.

In September 2014, FamilyNet was refocused with classic television series and films from the Sony Pictures Television libraries, with Sony also assisting with advertising sales. Religious programming, which used to make up the vast majority of the schedule under SBC and Schuller's ownership, was limited to Sunday mornings, though Rural Media also maintained FamilyNet's paid programming overnights despite their executives' traditional disdain for depending on those programs for revenue. (RFD-TV since also began to carry overnight paid programming.)

=== As The Cowboy Channel ===
On June 19, 2017, Rural Media Group CEO Patrick Gottsch announced that on July 1, FamilyNet would be rebranded as The Cowboy Channel, featuring a focus on Western sports and rodeo events, which had proven to be a popular attraction on RFD-TV. Gottsch thanked Sony Pictures Television for bringing the network to a solid footing, but noted that overwhelming competition in the classic television space from networks such as MeTV, Antenna TV, Cozi TV, Heroes & Icons and several other networks and streaming options had made the space more competitive and crowded, while a Western sports network was seen as a unique opportunity to stand out in cable and satellite lineups. Among the network's first offerings were encore events from RFD's The American Rodeo, the Calgary Stampede, and the Professional Bull Riders (PBR) archives. Sony's archived programming thus moved to their own GetTV at the start of 2018.

The Cowboy Channel signed a multi-year agreement with the Professional Rodeo Cowboys Association (PRCA) to televise and stream their major events, including the National Finals Rodeo (NFR), starting in 2020.

With the network conversion, Rural Media used the change in format as a contractual opportunity to terminate its remaining over-the-air affiliations to launch The Cowboy Channel as a pay-TV only offering.

A Canadian version of the channel was launched on February 1, 2020, on Shaw Direct television systems through a partnership with Rural Media.

On May 15, 2020, the Cowboy Channel+ app was launched. It streams live and past PRCA rodeos, as well as other western-related programming for a monthly or annual subscription fee. On March 16, 2026, it was renamed simply Cowboy+.

The Cowgirl Channel was launched on March 1, 2023. It specialized in programming about women in professional rodeo, western fashion, and rural lifestyles in general through the perspectives of women. It also televised rodeos that were not aired on The Cowboy Channel. The Cowgirl Channel officially ceased operations on November 15, 2025.

In 2023, The Cowboy Channel signed a multi-year agreement with the Canadian Professional Rodeo Association (CPRA) to televise and stream their major events, including the Canadian Finals Rodeo (CFR) through December 31, 2027. The Cowboy Channel Canada also televises these events.

Patrick Gottsch, the founder and president of Rural Media Group, died on May 18, 2024, at the age of 70. He was succeeded in leadership of Rural Media Group by his two eldest daughters, Raquel Gottsch Koehler and Gatsby Gottsch Solheim.

== Programming ==
Much of the Cowboy Channel's non-sports programming is drawn from RFD-TV's program library, with an emphasis on ranching and rodeo programs (thus the Cowboy Channel does not carry RFD-TV's music, agribusiness or news programming). Like RFD-TV, the Cowboy Channel carries brokered televangelism programming on Sunday mornings.

=== Current programming ===
- Best of America by Horseback
- Better Horses
- Chris Cox Horsemanship
- Cinch High School Rodeo Tour
- Gentle Giants
- Hidden Heritage
- Horse of the West
- Little Britches Rodeo
- Piper Yule
- PRCA ProRodeo
- ProRodeo Tonight
- Red Steagall is Somewhere West of Wall Street
- Ride Smart with Craig Cameron
- Road to the NFR
- Saddle Up with Dennis Brouse
- Special Cowboy Moments
- Steve Lantvit Horsemanship
- The Edge
- Total Team Roping
- Western Sports Round-Up
- Wild Rides
- Zero In

==== Reruns ====
- The Roy Rogers Show

=== Former programming ===
==== FamilyNet (1988–2017) ====
Title	Genre	Original network
All in the Family	Sitcom	CBS (1971–1979)
Archie Bunker's Place	Sitcom	CBS (1979–1983)
Barney Miller	Sitcom	ABC (1975–1982)
The Brady Bunch	Sitcom	ABC (1969–1974)
The Facts of Life	Sitcom	NBC (1979–1988)
Good Times	Sitcom	CBS (1974–1979)
Malcolm & Eddie	Sitcom	UPN (1996–2000)
Maude	Sitcom	CBS (1972–1978)
One Day at a Time	Sitcom	CBS (1975–1984)
Sanford and Son	Sitcom	NBC (1972–1977)
Silver Spoons	Sitcom	NBC (1982–1986); Syndication (1986–1987)
