= List of programs and films broadcast by Great American Family =

The following is a list of programs and films currently and formerly broadcast on Great American Family. The list also includes programming aired when the network was known as Great American Country.

== Original films ==
=== 2021 ===
Movie	Starring	Original airdate
An Autumn Romance	Chad Michael Murray and Jessica Lowndes	October 23, 2021
Much Ado About Christmas	Susie Abromeit and Torrance Coombs	October 30, 2021
The Great Christmas Switch	Sarah Lind, Dillon Casey, and Jon McLaren	November 6, 2021
Christmas Time is Here	Dewshane Williams, Rukiya Bernard and Tom Pickett	November 13, 2021
A Kindhearted Christmas	Cameron Mathison and Jennie Garth	November 20, 2021
Angel Falls Christmas	Jessica Lowndes and Chad Michael Murray	November 26, 2021
Royally Wrapped for Christmas	Jen Lilley and Brendan Fehr	November 27, 2021
Christmas is You	Becca Tobin and Matthew MacCaull	November 28, 2021
Jingle Bell Princess	Merritt Patterson and Trevor Donovan	December 4, 2021
A Lot Like Christmas	Maggie Lawson and Christopher Russell	December 5, 2021
A Christmas Miracle for Daisy	Jill Wagner and Nick Bateman	December 11, 2021
A Christmas Star	Sara Canning and Daniel Lissing	December 12, 2021
When Hope Calls Christmas	Lori Loughlin, Morgan Kohan, Ryan-James Hatanaka, Wendy Crewson and Daniel Lissing	December 18, 2021
Joy for Christmas	Cindy Busby and Sam Page	December 19, 2021

=== 2022 ===
Movie	Starring	Original airdate
A Cinderella Christmas (Note: Originally premiered on Ion Television.)	Emma Rigby and Peter Porte	January 2, 2022
The Winter Palace	Danica McKellar and Neal Bledsoe	January 8, 2022
Harmony From the Heart	Jessica Lowndes and Jesse Metcalfe	February 12, 2022
A Match Made at Christmas	Micah Lynn Hanson and Tim Llewellyn	July 3, 2022
Mrs. Miracle (Note: Originally premiered on Hallmark Channel.)	Erin Karpluk and James Van Der Beek	July 3, 2022
Call Me Mrs. Miracle	Doris Roberts, Eric Johnson, and Lauren Holly	July 3, 2022
Christmas in Carolina	Kellie Shanygne Williams, Darius McCrary, Joslyn Y. Hall, and David L. Rowell	July 4, 2022
Christmas Crush	Cindy Sampson, Robin Dunne, and Chris Violette	July 16, 2022
The Christmas Swap (Note: Originally premiered on Up TV.)	Jackie Seiden and Ashley Wood	July 17, 2022
The Christmas Calendar	Laura Bell Bundy and Brendon Zub	July 24, 2022
Merry Kissmas	Karissa Lee Staples and Brant Daugherty	July 24, 2022
Retreat To Paradise	Melanie Stone and Casey Elliott	August 13, 2022
Identical Love	Shae Robins and Mason Davis	August 20, 2022
Love in Bloom	Susie Abromeit and Julian Haig	August 27, 2022
Prescription for Love	Jillian Murray and Trevor Donovan	September 3, 2022
A Taste of Tuscany	Laura Mitchell and Brad Johnson	September 10, 2022
This Little Love of Mine	Saskia Hampele and Liam McIntyre	September 17, 2022
A Royal Seaside Romance (AH)	Brittany Bristow and Dan Jeannotte	September 24, 2022
Home for Harvest (AH)	Landy Cannon and Brigitte Kingsley	October 1, 2022
Cider and Sunsets (AH)	Erin Agostino and Aaron Ashmore	October 8, 2022
My Boss’ Wedding (AH)	Holly Deveaux and Drew Seeley	October 15, 2022
Destined at Christmas	Shae Robins and Casey Elliott	October 22, 2022
Catering Christmas	Merritt Patterson and Daniel Lissing	October 29, 2022
Christmas Lovers Anonymous	Brooke Burfitt and Houston Rhines	October 30, 2022
A Royal Christmas on Ice	Anna Marie Dobbins and Jonathan Stoddard	November 5, 2022
Love At the Christmas Contest	Samantha Cope and Ross Jirgl	November 6, 2022
A Merry Christmas Wish	Jill Wagner and Cameron Mathison	November 12, 2022
Christmas Sweethearts	Breanne Hill and Colton Little	November 13, 2022
Christmas in Pine Valley	Kristina Cole and Andrew Biernat	November 19, 2022
My Favorite Christmas Tree	Emma Johnson and Giles Panton	November 20, 2022
Christmas at the Drive-In	Danica McKellar and Neal Bledsoe	November 25, 2022
I'm Glad It's Christmas	Jessica Lowndes, Paul Greene and Gladys Knight	November 26, 2022
Candace Cameron Bure Presents: A Christmas...Present	Candace Cameron Bure and Marc Blucas	November 27, 2022
Candace Cameron Bure Presents: Christmas on Candy Cane Lane	Andrea Barber and Dan Payne	December 3, 2022
B&B Merry	Jen Lilley and Jesse Hutch	December 4, 2022
The Art of Christmas	Brigitte Kingsley, Joe Towne, Kelly Kruger, and Darin Brooks	December 10, 2022
Crown Prince of Christmas	Cindy Busby and Jilon VanOver	December 11, 2022
Aisle Be Home for Christmas	Jennifer Freeman and Garrett Watson	December 17, 2022
A Brush with Christmas	Jillian Murray and Joseph Cannata	December 18, 2022

(AH) Autumn Harvest

=== 2023 ===
Movie	Starring	Original airdate
A Prince in Paradise	Rhiannon Fish and Mitchell Bourke	January 7, 2023
From Chicago With Love	Rebecca Liddiard and Dan Jeannotte	January 14, 2023
Fall Into Winter	Lori Loughlin and James Tupper	January 28, 2023
Romantic Rewrite	Kristina Cole and Russell Quinn	February 4, 2023
A Charming Valentine	Carolina Bartczak and Chad Connell	February 11, 2023
Love in Aruba	Sashleigha Hightower and David Shawn McConnell	February 18, 2023
English Estate	Spencer Locke and Charlie Clapham	February 25, 2023
Happily Ever Emma	Monica Moore Smith and Dan Fowlks	March 4, 2023
A Belgian Chocolate Christmas	Jaclyn Hales and Zane Stephens	July 8, 2023
The Abigail Mysteries	Ansley Gordon and Bret Green	July 30, 2023
Romance at the Vineyard	Susie Abromeit and Tim Ross	August 5, 2023
Love on Repeat	Jen Lilley and Andrew Lawrence	August 7, 2023
An Unlikely Angel	Jillian Murray and Aaron Mees	August 12, 2023
Wedding Cake Dreams	Donna Benedicto and Markian Tarasiuk	August 14, 2023
Stepping Into Love	Jenna Michno and Christian Howard	August 19, 2023
Strong Fathers, Strong Daughters	Robyn Lively and Bart Johnson	August 21, 2023
Dream Wedding	Rebecca Dalton and Jesse Hutch	August 26, 2023
10 Steps to Love	Ella Cannon and Britton Webb	August 28, 2023
Learning to Love	Ina Barrón and Philip Boyd	September 2, 2023
Love Can Surprise You	Camilla Belle and David Lafontaine	September 9, 2023
One Perfect Match	Merritt Patterson and Joshua Sasse	September 16, 2023
Craft Me a Romance	Jodie Sweetin and Brent Bailey	September 23, 2023
A Harvest Homecoming	Jessica Lowndes and Trevor Donovan	September 30, 2023
Swing Into Romance	Danica McKellar and David Haydn-Jones	October 7, 2023
Destined 2: Christmas Once More	Shae Robins and Casey Elliott	October 14, 2023
‘Twas the Text Before Christmas	Merritt Patterson and Trevor Donovan	October 21, 2023
Bringing Christmas Home	Jill Wagner and Paul Greene	October 28, 2023
Journey to Christmas	Ash Tsai and Joey Heyworth	October 29, 2023
A Dash of Christmas	Laura Osnes and Christopher Russell	November 4, 2023
Our Christmas Wedding	Holly Deveaux and Drew Seeley	November 5, 2023
Christmas Keepsake	Jillian Murray and Daniel Lissing	November 11, 2023
A Christmas Blessing	Lori Loughlin, James Tupper and Jesse Hutch	November 12, 2023
Santa, Maybe	Aubrey Reynolds and Samuel Whitten	November 18, 2023
A Paris Christmas Waltz	Jen Lilley and Matthew Morrison	November 19, 2023
Candace Cameron Bure Presents: My Christmas Hero	Candace Cameron Bure and Gabriel Hogan	November 24, 2023
A Royal Date for Christmas	Danica McKellar and Damon Runyon	November 25, 2023
Candace Cameron Bure Presents: A Christmas for the Ages	Natasha Bure, Anna Ferguson, Kate Craven and Cheryl Ladd	November 26, 2023
Christmas in Maple Hills	Marcus Rosner and Emily Alatalo	November 27, 2023
Christmas On Windmill Way	Chad Michael Murray and Christa Taylor Brown	December 2, 2023
The Jinglebell Jubilee	Erin Agostino and Marshall Williams	December 3, 2023
Meet Me Under the Mistletoe	Sarah Fisher and Simon Arblaster	December 9, 2023
Peppermint and Postcards	Ella Cannon and Christopher Russell	December 10, 2023
Designing Christmas With You	Susie Abromeit and Liam McIntyre	December 16, 2023
12 Games of Christmas	Johnny Ramey and Felisha Cooper	December 17, 2023
A Royal Christmas Holiday	Brittany Underwood and Jonathan Stoddard	December 23, 2023

=== 2024 ===
Movie	Starring	Original airdate
Passport to Love	Shae Robins and Mason D. Davis	February 10, 2024
Candace Cameron Bure Presents: Just in Time	Laura Osnes and Greyston Holt	March 26, 2024
Sweet Maple Romance	Katerina Eichenberger and Jonathan Stoddard	July 27, 2024
Mr. Manhattan	Alexa PenaVega and Carlos PenaVega	August 3, 2024
God's Country Song	Justin Gaston and Mariel Hemingway	August 10, 2024
Nothing is Impossible	Nadia Bjorlin and David A.R. White	August 17, 2024
Finding Faith	Ashley Bratcher and Jonathan Stoddard	August 24, 2024
Divine Influencer	Lara Silva and Jason Burkey	August 31, 2024
The Engagement Plan	Jack Schumacher and Mia Pollini	September 7, 2024
Love's Second Act	Jodie Sweetin and Tilky Jones	September 14, 2024
Love at the Ranch	Laura Mitchell and Jon Cor	September 21, 2024
Mystery by the Book	Alicia Dea Josipovic and Corey Sevier	September 28, 2024
Ainsley McGregor Mysteries: A Case for the Winemaker	Candace Cameron Bure and Aaron Ashmore	October 5, 2024
Christmas Wreaths and Ribbons	Kristin Wollett and Casey Elliott	October 12, 2024
A Vintage Christmas	Merritt Patterson and Christopher Russell	October 19, 2024
A Christmas Castle Proposal	Rhiannon Fish and Mitchell Bourke	October 26, 2024
Tails of Christmas	Ash Tsai and Eric Guillmette	November 2, 2024
Christmas Under the Northern Lights	Jill Wagner and Jesse Hutch	November 9, 2024
Coupled Up for Christmas	Sara Canning and Marcus Rosner	November 10, 2024
Candace Cameron Bure Presents: A Christmas Less Traveled	Candace Cameron Bure and Eric Johnson	November 16, 2024
A Cozy Christmas Quilt	Ferelith Young and Harmon Walsh	November 17, 2024
A Little Women's Christmas	Trevor Donovan, Jillian Murray, Jen Lilley, Laura Osnes, Jesse Hutch, Julia Reilly, and Gladys Knight	November 23, 2024
Christmas by Candlelight	Erin Agostino and Harmon Walsh	November 24, 2024
I Heard The Bells	Jonathan Blair and Rachel Day Hughes	November 28, 2024
A Cinderella Christmas Ball	Danica McKellar and Oliver Rice	November 29, 2024
Candace Cameron Bure Presents: Home Sweet Christmas	Candace Cameron Bure and Cameron Mathison	December 1, 2024
Once Upon a Christmas Wish	Mario Lopez and Courtney Lopez	December 7, 2024
Let it Snow	Candace Cameron Bure, Jesse Hutch and Alan Thicke	December 8, 2024
Get Him Back for Christmas	Carlos PenaVega and Alexa PenaVega	December 14, 2024
Christmas In Scotland	Jill Winternitz and Dominic Watters	December 21, 2024
A Royal Christmas Ballet	Brittany Underwood and Jonathan Stoddard	December 22, 2024

=== 2025 ===
Movie	Starring	Original airdate
A Snapshot of Forever	Natalie Dreyfuss and Anthony Konechny	January 11, 2025
A Priceless Love	Erin Agostino and Luke Humphrey	January 18, 2025
For the Love of Chocolate	Rhiannon Fish and Jesse Hutch	February 15, 2025
Karen Kingsbury's Someone Like You	Sarah Fisher and Jake Allyn	February 22, 2025
Forty-Seven Days with Jesus	Yoshi Barrigas, Catherine Lidstone, and Emilio Palame	April 18, 2025
Faith of Angels	John Michael Finley, Cameron Arnett, and Kirby Heyborne	April 19, 2025
Seasoned with Love (Note: Originally premiered on BYUtv.)	Julia Benson and Peter Benson	May 17, 2025
One of a Kind Love	Jocelyn Hudon and Jake Manley	August 9, 2025
A Thread to Your Heart	Anna Hutchinson and Simon Arblaster	August 16, 2025
As Gouda as It Gets	Kim Shaw and Clayton James	August 23, 2025
The Wedding Arrangement	Kristina Cole and Cody Griffis	August 30, 2025
Grounded in Love	Danica McKellar and Trevor Donovan	September 27, 2025
Ainsley McGregor Mysteries: A Case for the Yarn Maker	Candace Cameron Bure and Aaron Ashmore	October 4, 2025
A Wisconsin Christmas Pie	Katie Leclerc and Ryan Carnes	October 11, 2025
A Christmas Prayer	Shae Robins and Christopher Russell	October 18, 2025
A Royal Icing Christmas	Ellise Roth and Callum Buckley	October 25, 2025
Christmas in Midnight Clear	Alicia Josipovic and Jon McLaren	November 1, 2025
A Very Curious Christmas	Brittany Bristow and Olivier Renaud	November 8, 2025
Christmas of Giving	Ash Tsai, Marshall Williams, and Julia Reilly	November 9, 2025
Candace Cameron Bure Presents: Timeless Tidings of Joy	Candace Cameron Bure and Paul Greene	November 15, 2025
Pencil Me In for Christmas	Greer Grammer and Jason Cermak	November 16, 2025
Christmas On Every Page	Rose Reid and Jake Allyn	November 22, 2025
Christmas North of Nashville	Emily Alatalo and Jonathan Stoddard	November 23, 2025
The Christmas Spark	Mario Lopez and Ali Cobrin	November 28, 2025
There's No Place Like Christmas	Cindy Busby and Sam Page	November 30, 2025
Christmas at the Inn	Jill Wagner and Trevor Donovan	December 6, 2025
Christmas At Mistletoe Manor	Madeleine Coghlan and Lior Selve	December 7, 2025
Have We Met This Christmas?	Danica McKellar and Jesse Hutch	December 13, 2025
A Royal Christmas Tail	Brittany Underwood and Jonathan Stoddard	December 14, 2025
Candace Cameron Bure Presents: Another Sweet Christmas	Candace Cameron Bure and Cameron Mathison	December 20, 2025
Mario Lopez Presents: Chasing Christmas	Jillian Murray and Trevor Donovan	December 21, 2025

=== 2026 ===
Movie	Starring	Original airdate
Ainsley McGregor Mysteries: A Case for the Watchmaker	Candace Cameron Bure and Aaron Ashmore	January 10, 2026
Meet Me in New York	Brooke Nevin and Corey Sevier	February 7, 2026
Love for Starters	Stephanie Bennett and Jonathan Cherry	February 14, 2026
A Missed Connection	Meggan Kaiser and Alex Trumble	February 21, 2026
Love Afloat	Alanna Smith and Travis Bravo-Thomas	February 28, 2026
Blessings in Disguise	Shae Robins and Casey Elliott	March 28, 2026
Bee My Love	Ann Pirvu and Robin Dunne	April 11, 2026
Meet Me in the Margins	Merritt Patterson and Liam McIntyre	June 13, 2026
The Trouble with Christmas Mistletoe	Jillian Murray and Brett Varvel	July 11, 2026
A Prince in Paradise: A Royal Wedding	Rhiannon Fish and Mitchell Bourke	August 1, 2026
Candace Cameron Bure Presents: A Second Chance Christmas	Candace Cameron Bure and Jonathan Scarfe	October 10, 2026
Silver Bells at Christmas	Laura Osnes, Ryan McPartlin, Chuck Wicks, Taylor Kalupa, Julia Reilly, Tanya Christiansen and D.B. Sweeney	October 17, 2026
A Christmas Prayer Tradition	Shae Robins and Christopher Russell	October 24, 2026
Candace Cameron Bure Presents: A Very Arctic Christmas	Cameron Mathison and Jill Wagner	October 31, 2026
Karen Kingsbury's The Christmas Ring	Jana Kramer and Ben Hollingsworth	November 7, 2026
An Ozark Mountain Christmas	Jonathan Stoddard and Brianna Cohen	November 8, 2026
The Christmas Yes List	Danica McKellar and Sam Page	November 14, 2026
Christmas at Moose Lake	Britt Robertson, Ryan Paevey, Kevin Dillon and Natasha Henstridge	November 15, 2026
Three Generations, One Christmas	Mario Lopez, Tony Danza and Dominic Lopez	November 21, 2026
Letters This Christmas	Ashley Newbrough and Jesse Hutch	November 22, 2026
Candace Cameron Bure Presents: A Sweet Christmas Anniversary	Candace Cameron Bure and Cameron Mathison	November 27, 2026
A Rescue Dog For Christmas	Stephanie Bennett and Trevor Donovan	November 28, 2026
The Greatest Christmas Gift	Danica McKellar and Matthew Marsden	November 29, 2026
The Christmas Ornament Library	Merritt Patterson and Ryan Paevey	December 5, 2026
Christmas By the Spoonful	Laura Vandervoort and Olivier Renaud	December 6, 2026
Making Christmas Bright	Jillian Murray and Liam McIntyre	December 12, 2026
A Very Evergreen Christmas	Katie Leclerc and Jeremy Guilbaut	December 13, 2026
Christmas Wrapped in Love	Cindy Busby and Marcus Rosner	December 19, 2026

== Current programming ==
=== Original programming ===
==== Drama ====
Title	Genre	Premiere	Seasons	Length	Status
When Hope Calls (Brookfield) (seasons 2–3) (Note: Acquired from Hallmark Media)	Western drama	December 18, 2021	2 seasons, 14 episodes	41–44 min	Renewed for season 4
County Rescue	Medical drama	February 26, 2024	3 seasons, 17 episodes	25–38 min	Pending
Crossroad Springs	Western drama	August 28, 2025	2 seasons, 15 episodes	40–43 min	Ongoing

==== Unscripted ====
Title	Genre	Premiere	Seasons	Length	Status
Jep & Jess: Beyond the Bayou	Reality	August 15, 2026	1 season, 6 episodes	44 min	Pending

=== Syndicated programming ===
==== Dramas ====
- Columbo
- Perry Mason

== Former programming ==
=== As Great American Country ===
- All-American Amusement Parks (2014)
- Aloha Builds
- Barn Hunters
- Barnwood Builders
- Behind the Scenes (1997–2004)
- Betty White's Smartest Animals in America (2015)
- Big Wheels of Country (2003–2005)
- Carnival Eats
- Celebrity Kitchen with Lorianne Crook (2003–2005)
- Celebrity Motor Homes
- Championship Bull Riding (2009–2011)
- Country Music Across America (2003–2008)
- Country Requests Live (2000–2005)
- Crook & Chase (2003–2005) https://en.wikipedia.org/wiki/Crook_%26_Chase
- Design on a Dime
- Endless Yard Sale Showdown
- Farm Kings
- Fast Forward (1997–2005)
- Flea Market Flip
- GAC Classic (2001–2006)
- GAC Late Shift
- GAC Nights
- GAC Outdoor Country
- Gaither Gospel Hour
- Great American Roadhouse (2002–2003)
- Growing Up Gator
- Headline Country
- The Hitmen of Music Row (2007)
- Hot Country Nights (2004)
- I Brake for Yard Sales
- Inside Country (1998–2000)
- Into the Circle
- The Jennie Garth Project
- Junk Gypsies
- Kimberly's Simply Southern
- KingBilly (2008)
- Lakefront Bargain Hunt
- Living Countryfied
- Log Cabin Living
- Made in America (2003–2004)
- Main Street Videos
- Master Series
- Moving Country
- My Music Mix (2005–2009)
- Next GAC Star (2008)
- Offstage with Lorianne Crook (2005–2007)
- Oh That Dog of Mine! (1999)
- On the Edge of Country (1997–2008)
- Our Song (2009)
- On the Streets
- Opry Live (October 4th 2003 - 2011)
- Patriotic Country (2004)
- Pick a Puppy
- Positively GAC
- PRCA ProRodeo (2011–2013)
- The Road Hammers (2008)
- Soundstage
- Superstar Sessions
- Tiny House, Big Living
- Top 15 Country Countdown (1997–2001)
- Top 20 Country Countdown (2004–2018)
- Top 50 Videos of the Year
- Tori and Dean: Cabin Fever
- Ultimate Sportman's Lodge
- Wake Up Call Videos
- The Willis Clan
- The Year

=== As GAC Family/Great American Family ===
==== Syndicated programming ====
===== Sitcoms =====
- Bewitched
- The Facts of Life
- Father Knows Best
- Full House
- Fuller House
- Hazel
- I Dream of Jeannie
- Silver Spoons
- The Andy Griffith Show
- Who's the Boss?

===== Dramas =====
- Little House on the Prairie
- The Lone Ranger
- Murder, She Wrote
- Wagon Train

== Specials ==
=== As GAC Family/Great American Family ===
- Welcome to Great American Christmas (2021)
- When Hope Calls: Hearties Christmas Present (2021)
- K-9 Hero Awards (2022)
- Great American Christmas in Kentucky (2022)
- Great American Rescue Bowl (2023–present)
- To The Rescue Pup-A-Thon (2023)
- The Passion Play (2023–present)
- Nativity – The Art of Maltese Crib-Making (2023)
- A Silent Night at Museum of the Bible (2023)
- Gentri – Finding Christmas (2023)
- Tournament of Roses Parade (2024–present)
- Movieguide Awards (2024–present)
- Museum of the Bible Presents: The History of Easter (2024)
- National Christmas Tree Lighting Ceremony (2025)
- Caroling in Crossroad Springs (2025)
- Gardenuity (2026)
- The Power of a Second Chance (2026)
- Jesus Live! (2026)
