= Frndly TV =

American streaming television service

- Founded: October 1, 2019; 7 years ago
- Headquarters: Denver, Colorado, U.S.
- Owner: Roku, Inc.
- Founders: Bassil El-Khatib; Michael McKenna; Andy Karofsky; Mike McClain
- Industry: Pay television
- Services: Streaming television
- Website: frndlytv.com
- Users: ▲700,000 subscribers (as of December 8, 2022)

Frndly TV, stylized as frndly^{TV}, is an American streaming television service owned by Roku, Inc. that offers live TV, on demand video and cloud-based DVR for over 50 live television networks. Frndly TV has a channel lineup with a focus on family-friendly programming, and includes U.S. networks Hallmark Channel, The Weather Channel, A&E, History, Lifetime, MeTV, Story Television, MeTV+, MeTV Toons, Up TV and Aspire.

== History ==
Frndly TV was founded in October 2019 by a group of Dish Network alumni: Andy Karofsky, Bassil El-Khatib, Michael McKenna, and Mike McClain who felt many of the streaming bundles were getting too big. In October 2019, Frndly TV launched with 12 live TV channels and cloud DVR storage, with channels that included Hallmark Channel, The Weather Channel, and Outdoor Channel. In December 2019, TechHive awarded Frndly TV runner-up for the best new service of 2019.

In March 2020, Frndly TV added Curiosity Channel and INSP, bringing the live TV channel count to 15.

In 2021, Frndly TV added several channels with the addition of Dove Channel (March 2021), via a deal with Cinedigm Networks as well as BYU TV (April 2021). In June 2021, Frndly TV added two new channels owned by Allen Media Group: Recipe.TV and Local Now. In July 2021, Frndly TV added GetTV in a distribution agreement with Sony Pictures Television. FETV (Family Entertainment Television) was also added the same month. In August 2021, Circle network was added. Hallmark Movies Now (now Hallmark+) was made available in October 2021 as Frndly's first add on option to the service. Frndly TV and GAC Media reached an agreement to add GAC Media channels GAC Living (now Great American Living) and GAC Family (now Great American Family) to the service in October 2021. Frndly TV and A&E Networks reached a deal to add A&E's portfolio of channels such as A&E, History, and Lifetime to the streaming service on November 18, 2021. With the addition, the price of the service went up for the first time.

Further additions were made in 2022, including the Family Movie Classics (FMC) channel being added to the service in January 2022. In March 2022, Frndly TV announced a multi-year agreement with Weigel Broadcasting to bring five national TV networks to its lineup: MeTV, Heroes & Icons, Decades (now Catchy Comedy), Story Television, and Start TV. This made Frndly TV the first live TV streaming service to carry all five of the networks. In June 2022, Frndly TV announced the addition of 3 new channels: Movies!, Dove Movies, and Crime & Investigation. This bringing the live TV channel count to over 40 channels; however, Weigel Broadcasting's Movies! would not be added to the service until the following year. In December 2022, Frndly TV began adding more on-demand TV shows and movies from A&E networks.

In January 2023, Frndly TV added the Cowboy Way Channel. The following February, Frndly TV added Ion Television, Grit and Ion Mystery networks with an agreement with the E. W. Scripps Company. After a long delay, Movies! was added to the service on February 3, 2023. In September 2023, Frndly TV announced that MeTV+ would be coming to the service in October 2023. This made Frndly TV the first streaming service to offer the channel. In addition, Frndly TV raised the price on all of their plans by $1.00 in September 2023. In October 2023, Frndly TV added five new channels, MeTV+, Pursuit Channel, Waypoint TV, Justice Central and AccuWeather Network; however, the service dropped two channels, Sportsman Channel and World Fishing Network.

In January 2024, Frndly TV lost Circle TV due to the network ending the OTA broadcast, and Frndly TV opted not to carry the broadcaster's streaming channel Circle Country; however, it gained two channels: Laff and Court TV. On February 6, 2024, Frndly TV announced that it dropped the Curiosity Channel from their lineup. Bounce TV was added on February 14. On April 10, 2024, Frndly TV announced it would add local non-Big Four affiliates in some markets by the end of April. On April 17, 2024, Frndly TV announced the addition of four new add-ons: Lifetime Movie Club, History Vault, A&E Crime Central, & Great American Pure Flix. Lifetime Movie Club went live on April 16, with the rest of the add-ons launching later in 2024. On June 25, 2024, Frndly TV added MeTV Toons and Dabl to its lineup. Aspire TV was added to the service on August 30. On September 17, 2024, Frndly TV added ION+ to the service, and announced Craftsy TV would be added at a later date. The service also announced it would discontinue carrying three channels: Accuweather, Waypoint TV and Pursuit by September 27, 2024; however, only Accuweather and Waypoint were removed, and Pursuit is still on the service.

In February 2025, Frndly TV added four Stingray Music channels to its lineup. This addition brought the total of music channels to six, after two holiday music channels were added in November 2024. In March 2025, BabyFirst was dropped and Cleo TV was added. In April 2025, Frndly TV informed monthly subscribers that the monthly price would go up one dollar on May 15 for existing subscribers. Customers that paid yearly would not see any price hike. On April 22, 2025, Frndly TV added Reelz to their lineup. On May 7, 2025, Frndly removed Recipe.TV and added TheGrio to their lineup. On September 29, 2025, Frndly TV added WEST to its lineup with the addition occurring on the inaugural day of the new network. In October 2025, MovieSphere Gold and EnvoyTV were added to the Frndly TV lineup.

In June 2026, Frndly TV added UP Faith & Family to its list of premium add-ons.

=== Acquisition by Roku ===
On May 1, 2025, Roku, Inc. announced that it was acquiring Frndly TV for $185 million. Frndly TV had already been available on Roku devices prior to the acquisition announcement. The acquisition allows Roku to expand further into live television. The deal was closed within the second quarter of 2025. Following the acquisition, Frndly TV became one of the default apps on Roku devices.

== Supported devices ==
Frndly TV's service can be streamed via a number of platforms including Android devices, and Apple devices such as iPhone and iPad. In addition, the service is available via Roku, Vizio, Samsung, Apple TV, Amazon Fire TV, Android TV, Chromecast and multiple web browsers.
