= Merritt Patterson =

Canadian actress

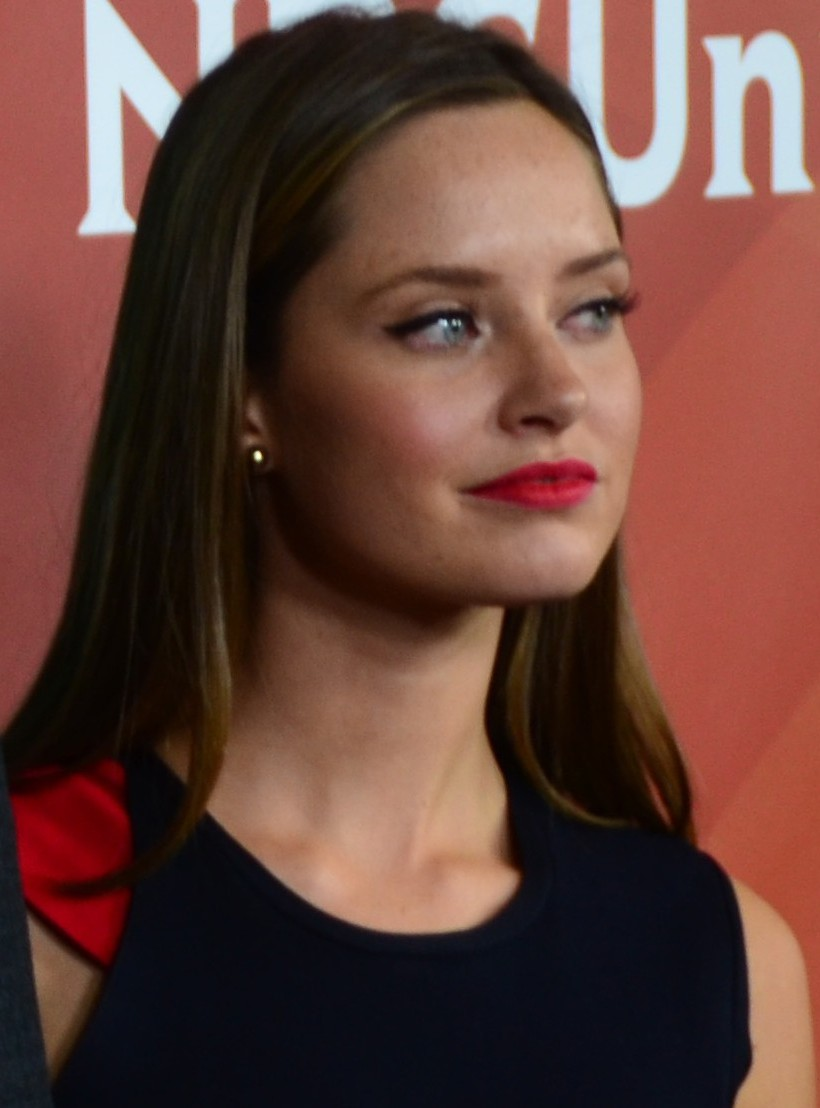
- Patterson attending the TCA Press Tour in January 2015
- Born: September 2, 1990 (age 36); Whistler, British Columbia, Canada
- Occupation: Actress
- Years active: 2006–present
- Spouse: JR Ringer (m. 2022)
- Awards: Canadian Herbal Essence Teen Model Search (2006)

Merritt Patterson (born September 2, 1990) is a Canadian actress best known for her leading roles as Olivia Matheson on the ABC Family supernatural teen drama series Ravenswood (2013–2014), Ophelia Pryce on the first season of the E! soap opera The Royals (2015), and Olivia Brukner on the second season of the Crackle drama series The Art of More (2016).

== Career ==
Early in her career, Patterson played several recurring roles including her first credit as a recurring guest star on ABC Family series Kyle XY. She then went on to star opposite Debby Ryan in Disney Channel's Radio Rebel. In 2013, Patterson starred as Olivia Matheson in the ABC Family series, Ravenswood.

In 2015, she portrayed Ophelia Pryce on The Royals, the first scripted show for E!, opposite Elizabeth Hurley.

In 2016, Patterson was cast in the second season of the Crackle television drama The Art of More, playing Olivia Brukner, the daughter of Dennis Quaid's character.

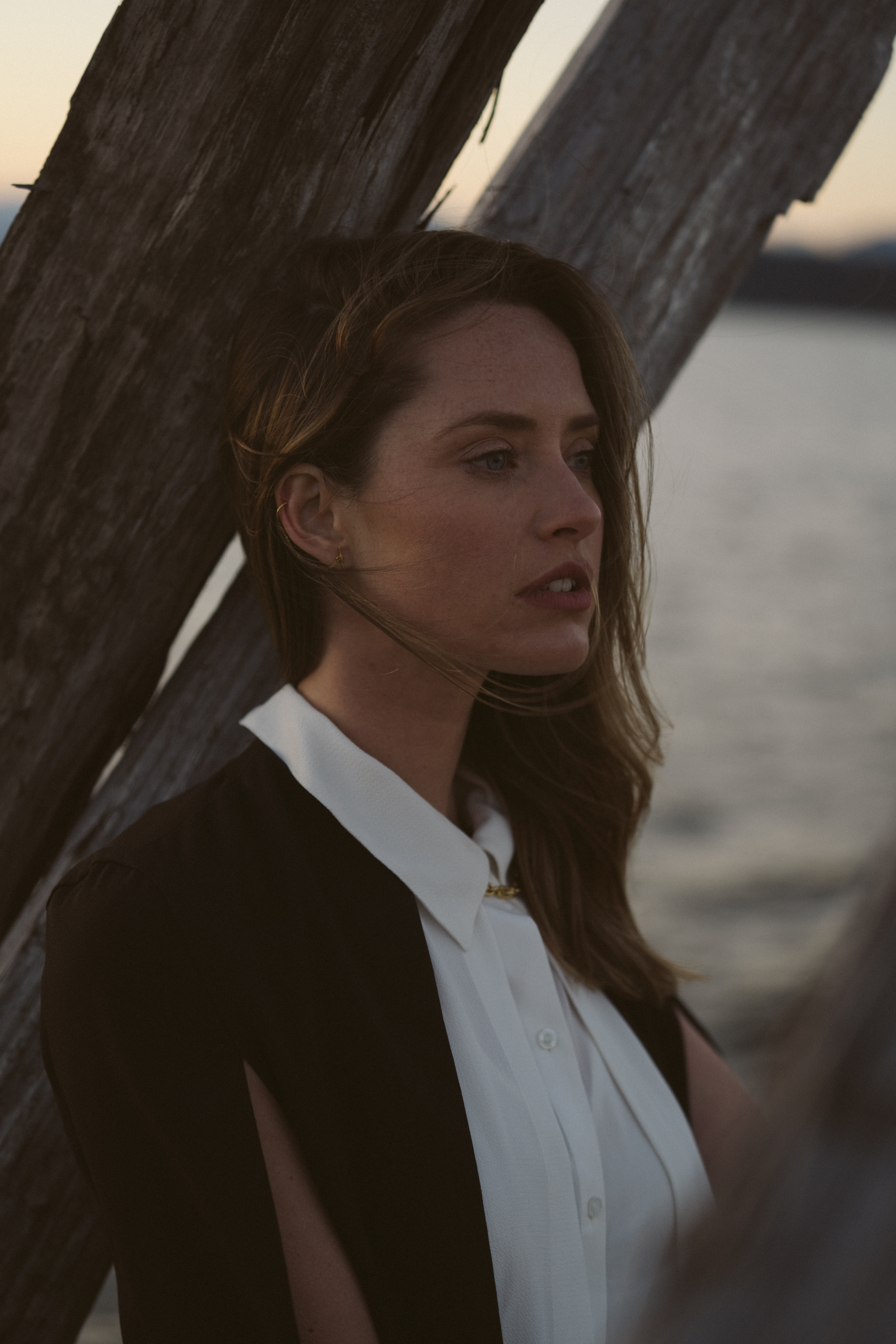
Patterson in 2021

From 2017 to 2021, Patterson starred in 11 Hallmark Channel and Great American Family movies. In 2018, she starred as Cynthia Applewhite in Universal Pictures feature film Unbroken: Path to Redemption. Patterson was nominated at the Movieguide Awards for Best Supporting Actress and won Best Supporting Actress at the Canadian International Faith & Family Film Festival.

In 2021, Patterson was cast opposite Dave Franco, Daryl Hannah, and Bill Murray in Quibi's TV miniseries The Now.

In 2022, Patterson starred in Catering Christmas for Great American Family opposite Daniel Lissing.

In 2023, Patterson starred in One Perfect Match opposite Joshua Sasse and Twas the Text Before Christmas opposite Trevor Donovan, both for Great American Family.

== Personal life ==
On September 17, 2022, Patterson and JR Ringer exchanged vows in Puglia, a southern region of Italy, at a private ceremony.

== Filmography ==
=== Film ===
List of acting performances in film
Year	Title	Role	Notes
2009	The Hole	Jessica	as Merrit Patterson
2010	Percy Jackson & the Olympians: The Lightning Thief	Pretty Girl #2	
2012	Rufus	Tracy	
2014	Kid Cannabis	Nicole Greffard	
2014	Wolves	Angelina Timmins	
2014	Primary	Sara Jasper	
2018	Unbroken: Path to Redemption	Cynthia Zamperini	
2022	Heatwave	Eve Crane	

=== Television ===
List of acting performances in television
Year	Title	Role	Notes
2006	Kyle XY	Ashleigh Redmond	Episodes: "Diving In", "Endgame"
2009	Supernatural	Cheerleader	Episode: "After School Special"
2010	Life Unexpected	Nicole	Episode: "Bong Intercepted"
2011	The Troop	Miranda	Episode: "This Bird You Cannot Change"
2011	Iron Invader	Claire	Television film (Syfy)
2012	The Pregnancy Project	Maddie	Television film (Lifetime)
2012	Radio Rebel	Stacy DeBane	Television film (Disney Channel)
2012	The Selection	Ashley Brouillette	Unsold television pilot
2013–2014	Ravenswood	Olivia Matheson	Main role
2014	Damaged	Taran Hathaway	Television film (Lifetime)
2015	The Royals	Ophelia Pryce	Main role (season 1)
2016	Motive	Liz Kerr	Episode: "Natural Selection"
2016	The Art of More	Olivia Brukner	Main role (season 2)
2017	Bad Date Chronicles	Leigh Rynes	Television film (PixL)
2017	A Royal Winter	Maggie Marks	Television film (Hallmark)
2017	The Christmas Cottage	Lacey Quinn	Television film (Hallmark)
2018	Wedding March 4: Something Old, Something New	Abby Russo	Television film (Hallmark)
2018	Christmas at the Palace	Katie Hendricks	Television film (Hallmark)
2019	Picture a Perfect Christmas	Sophie Griffiths	Television film (Hallmark)
2019	Forever in My Heart	Jenna	Television film (Hallmark)
2020	Chateau Christmas	Margot Hammond	Television film (Hallmark)
2021	Gingerbread Miracle	Maya	Television film (Hallmark)
2021	Jingle Bell Princess	Princess Amelia	Television film (GAC Family)
2021	The Now	April	Television miniseries, 3 episodes
2022	Catering Christmas	Molly Frost	Television film (Great American Family)
2023	One Perfect Match	Lucy Marks	Television film (Great American Family)
2023	Twas the Text Before Christmas	Addie	Television film (Great American Family)
2024	A Vintage Christmas	Tessa	Television film (Great American Family)
