= Storme Warren =

American radio and television personality

- Born: Storme Warren; Cincinnati, Ohio, U.S.
- Education: California State University, Northridge, CA Oklahoma State University
- Occupation: Broadcaster/Host
- Notable credit(s): Headline Country host and executive producer (2003–2014); SiriusXM 'The Highway' (56) radio host (2008–2023); TuneIn 'The Big 615' radio host (2023–Present)
- Spouse: Allison
- Children: Two

Storme Warren is an American television and radio broadcaster, best known as the host of The Big 615 channel on TuneIn as a part of Garth Brooks' Sevens Network as well as the former host of The Storme Warren Show weekday mornings on SiriusXM's channel The Highway.

Storme also created Stone Beaver productions where he produced the popular entertainment news magazine show Headline Country which aired on the GAC Television network for 12 years. His television career began as a segment producer on CNN's Showbiz Today, and then on to TNN Country News and This Week in Country Music as an entertainment reporter.

In December 2009, The Tennessean wrote that Warren was the "Dick Clark of Nashville." He hosted the inaugural "Music City New Year's Eve Bash on Broadway" in 2009/2010. He is also a host for selected events at the CMA Music Festival and at Nashville's 4 July "Let Freedom Ring" celebration.

In February 2020, Warren was given the "BMI Ambassador Award" to recognize his support and promotion of Nashville's vibrant songwriting community.

In late 2020, Warren launched his own podcast Exit 209 with Storme Warren showcasing artists and the life changing decisions they made to get to where they are today. Exit 209 recently expanded to having a songwriter series highlighting the songwriters and the stories behind the songs.

Warren is a member of the Nashville community serving on the board of directors for ACM Lifting Lives and Operation Song. Warren also works with Make-A-Wish Foundation, the USO, Tough Enough to Wear Pink, and Charlie Daniels' Journey Home Project. He is also an Eagle Scout.

== Career timeline ==
- 1990–1992: CNN - cameraman
- 1992– 1993: Showbiz Today - reporter
- 1993–2002: The Nashville Network (TNN)
- April, 2003–2014: Headline Country - host, executive producer, writer
- 2008- 2023: SiriusXM - The Highway (56) host
- 2023–present: the Big 615 - host, in TuneIn radio app^{4}
