= Great American Faith & Living =

American pay TV channel

- Country: United States
- Broadcast area: United States
- Headquarters: Fort Worth, Texas

Programming
- Language(s): American English

Ownership
- Owner: Great American Media
- Sister channels: Great American Family

History
- Launched: October 1, 2014
- Former names: Ride TV (2014–2021); GAC Living (2021–2022); Great American Living (2022–2023)

Links
- Website: www.greatamericanliving.tv

Great American Faith & Living is an American cable television network owned by Great American Media, who also operates Great American Family. The channel primarily broadcasts westerns and lifestyle programming.

Established in 2014 as Ride TV, the network was originally focused on equestrianism. After being acquired by Great American Media, the network relaunched as GAC Living and refocused on lifestyle programming targeting the southern U.S.— effectively inheriting the previous format of Great American Country after it was relaunched as GAC Family.

== History ==
The channel originally launched as Ride TV, a high-definition channel focused on the non-racing aspects of equestrian sports, horses, and the associated lifestyle. Ride TV was stated to be targeting both a rural, "Heartland" audience and a wider general audience, with an executive explaining that "horses are universal. Everyone recognizes the beauty and the power of this animal. We try to cater to anyone who gets that feeling when they see a horse running."

On June 8, 2021, it was announced that both Ride TV and Discovery Inc.'s Great American Country would be acquired by GAC Media, an investment group led by Tom Hicks and former Crown Media Holdings CEO Bill Abbott.

In August 2021, GAC Media announced that Great American Country and Ride TV would be relaunched as GAC Family and GAC Living on September 27, with the GAC initials re-backronymed to stand for "Great American Channels". When Ride TV relaunched as GAC Living it effectively inherited Great American Country's previous format on non-scripted westerns and country lifestyle programming while GAC Family shifted its programming to a family-oriented general entertainment format similar to that of Hallmark Channel.

In July 2022, GAC Media announced that GAC Living would be renamed Great American Living on August 20, 2022, as part of their corporate rebranding as Great American Media.

On October 9, 2023, Great American Media announced that the channel would rebrand again as Great American Faith & Living, with plans to increase its synergies with co-owned streaming service Great American Pure Flix by adding more faith-based programming.

== Programming ==
The channel's schedule currently consists primarily of westerns and lifestyle programming.

Its schedule was originally focused on horse sports such as equestrian, rodeo, and bull riding (such as the PBR Velocity Tour), purposefully excluding horse racing, whose niche was already filled by the TVG Networks. The channel has also produced original series, such as Cowgirls (a documentary-style series following women in rodeo) and This Old Horse (a documentary series chronicling notable horses, which was described as the network's equivalent to ESPN's 30 for 30 franchise).

== Carriage ==
In October 2021, Frndly TV reached a carriage agreement for GAC Family and GAC Living.

In November 2021, GAC Media reached a deal with Philo to add GAC Living and GAC Family.
