= Wolves (2014 film) =

2014 werewolf film

- Theatrical release poster
- Directed by: David Hayter
- Written by: David Hayter
- Produced by: Steven Hoban
- Starring: Lucas Till; Stephen McHattie; John Pyper-Ferguson; Merritt Patterson; Jason Momoa
- Cinematography: Gavin Smith
- Edited by: Geoff Ashenhurst
- Music by: Ilya Kaplan; Alex Khaskin
- Production companies: TF1 International; Copperheart Entertainment
- Distributed by: Entertainment One
- Release date: August 28, 2014
- Running time: 90 minutes
- Country: Canada
- Language: English
- Budget: $18 million
- Box office: $491,154

Wolves is a 2014 Canadian coming-of-age horror film written and directed by David Hayter, and starring Lucas Till, Stephen McHattie, John Pyper-Ferguson, Merritt Patterson and Jason Momoa. The film received a negative critical response.

== Plot ==
Cayden Richards is an average college student who plays football. Enraged by a rival player's headbutt during the football game, he retaliates with superhuman strength. Cayden later hurts his girlfriend, Lisa, when the passion of making out causes him to transform into a werewolf. After waking up covered in blood and surrounded by the dismembered bodies of his parents, he flees as the police arrive.

Cayden becomes a drifter, trying to keep his lycanthropy under control. In a roadside bar, he draws the attention of Wild Joe, who reveals himself to be a werewolf. Joe explains that werewolves come in two types: purebreds are natural-born werewolves from a small number of werewolf families that came to North America with the early settlers, while the bitten are more human-like and do not give birth to werewolf children. Cayden has only recently discovered that he was adopted; Joe confirms that they are both natural werewolves and that Cayden can learn more in a remote town called Lupine Ridge.

Cayden travels to Lupine Ridge and visits a bar, drawing hostile attention from the locals. Cayden is attracted to Angelina "Angel" Timmins, the beautiful young owner of the bar. He is eventually driven out of the bar by the locals and meets John Tollerman, who hires him as a farmhand. After working for Tollerman for a while, Cayden heads into town one night and is approached by a werewolf of his bloodline who understands who Cayden is, warning him that he is in danger and should leave town. Cayden's cousin is then killed by Connor, the alpha werewolf and ringleader of the patrons in Angel's bar. Cayden runs into Angel, and together they witness Connor and his pack eating Cayden's cousin after the murder.

John later tells Cayden about his birth mother, Lucinda, who was John's niece. Connor had seen her and fallen in love with her, but he knew of the tension between the packs, so he raped her. Only John and his wife knew about Lucinda's resulting pregnancy, and Lucinda killed herself shortly after Cayden's birth. The peace comes with the condition that Connor can mate with Angel as he desires a son, not knowing about Cayden.

Cayden has started a relationship with Angel and wants to cancel the town's arrangement, but the town werewolves fear what the more bestial mountain werewolves would do in retaliation. Cayden goes to the mountains to confront them and reveals his parentage, but Connor is skeptical and unleashes his pack on Cayden. While Cayden is stronger than the individual bitten wolves, he will not use lethal force and is overwhelmed by the pack. He manages to jump off a nearby cliff to escape.

Cayden and John form a plan to deal with the mountain pack. Before they can act, Connor kidnaps Angel and readies to mate with her. Cayden kills two of the pack and lures the others into a trap where he and John use explosives to kill them all. Cayden defeats Connor in single combat, but Connor reveals that he and Lucinda were actually in love; he made up the rape story to protect her because her father was going to kill her for the relationship.

Wild Joe suddenly arrives and reveals that he planned the events all along, killing Cayden's adoptive parents and convincing him to go to Lupine Ridge so that he could kill Connor in revenge for Joe's own past issues with Connor. Joe kills Connor but is killed by Cayden.

Cayden decides to leave with Angel to see the world, but he promises John they will be back. John gives him a scroll showing the bloodlines of the purebred werewolves to help him find others during their journey.

== Cast ==
- Lucas Till as Cayden Richards
- Jason Momoa as Connor Slaughter
- Merritt Patterson as Angelina "Angel" Timmins
- John Pyper-Ferguson as Joe "Wild Joe" Wills
- Stephen McHattie as John Tollerman
- Janet-Laine Green as Clara Tollerman
- Kaitlyn Leeb as Lisa Stewart
- Jennifer Hale as Janice Richards
- Adam Butcher as Deke
- Philip Maurice Hayes as Kino
- Miriam McDonald as Haley
- Melanie Scrofano as Gail Timmins
- Brandon McGibbon as Carter Wills
- Jonathan Llyr as Larson Wills
- Eric Trask as Mayor Robinson
- Adam MacDonald as Marty
- Alain Moussi as Dobie
- Thomas J. Strada as Robbie

== Reception ==
On the review aggregator website Rotten Tomatoes, 16% of 19 critics' reviews are positive. Metacritic, which uses a weighted average, assigned the film a score of 37 out of 100, based on 11 critics, indicating "generally unfavorable" reviews.

On The Observer, Rex Reed rated it 2.5/4 stars desbribing the film as "sexy, violent and creepy, but damn if it didn’t keep me glued to my chair with tension." Jordan Hoffman of New York Daily News rated it 3/5 stars writing that "the first 30 minutes of this cheap-looking monster drama are admittedly rough going. But once the Twilight meets- Sons of Anarchy silliness kicks in, there's a lovable lunacy at work."

Shock Till You Drop and the New York Times both panned the film, with Shock Till You Drop stating that the film took itself too seriously and "as a result it comes across as, well again…silly. Also, there's a sleazy, date-rapey angle to the film that undermines any potential for fun this film could have had."

On Variety magazine, Dennis Harvey wrote that "while it's a painless watch, Wolves looks comparatively bland as an adolescent male answer to (....) Ginger Snaps franchise." On Common Sense Media, Sandie Angulo Chen rated it 1/5 stars describing as "Forgettable werewolf flick is soapy and occasionally gory."

== See also ==
- List of coming-of-age stories
- List of horror films of 2014
