= List of The Royals episodes =

The Royals is an American television drama series that premiered on E! on March 15, 2015. The series began as a loose adaptation of the Michelle Ray novel Falling for Hamlet, and each episode is named after a line of dialogue from William Shakespeare's Hamlet. The series features a fictional contemporary British royal family as they deal with drama and scandals inside and outside of their family while in the public eye.

During the course of the series, 40 episodes of The Royals aired over four seasons, between March 15, 2015, and May 13, 2018.

== Series overview ==
Season	Episodes	Originally released	
Season	Episodes	First released	Last released
1	10	March 15, 2015	May 17, 2015
2	10	November 15, 2015	January 17, 2016
3	10	December 4, 2016	February 19, 2017
4	10	March 11, 2018	May 13, 2018

== Episodes ==
=== Season 1 (2015) ===
No. overall	No. in season	Title	Directed by	Written by	Original release date	U.S. viewers (millions)
1	1	"Stand and Unfold Yourself"	Mark Schwahn	Mark Schwahn	March 15, 2015	1.41
The Royal Family of England is thrown into disarray when the heir to the throne is killed in an accident.
2	2	"Infants of the Spring"	Mark Schwahn	Mark Schwahn	March 22, 2015	1.32
Liam's ex-girlfriend Gemma reappears, while Jasper keeps Eleanor under his finger. Helena and Cyrus work to thwart Simon's intent to abolish the monarchy.
3	3	"We Are Pictures, or Mere Beasts"	Arlene Sanford	Mark Schwahn	March 29, 2015	0.83
Helena and Eleanor face off with competing fashion shows. Liam avoids a scandal.
4	4	"Sweet, Not Lasting"	Jean de Segonzac	Johnny Richardson	April 5, 2015	1.12
Helena takes Liam on a promotional campaign in the countryside while Eleanor goes on her own charity tour.
5	5	"Unmask Her Beauty to the Moon"	Arlene Sanford	Julia Cohen	April 12, 2015	1.07
At the annual masquerade ball, Liam and Ophelia eye each other from afar, Eleanor and Jasper come to an understanding, and Helena meets her lover.
6	6	"The Slings and Arrows of Outrageous Fortune"	Jean de Segonzac	Mark Schwahn	April 19, 2015	1.12
During a weekend in Monaco, Liam and Ophelia explore a relationship, and Eleanor reconnects with an old flame. Back at the palace, Helena sleeps with Jasper.
7	7	"Your Sovereignty of Reason"	Tom Vaughan	Scarlett Lacey	April 26, 2015	1.13
In the aftermath of the Monaco trip, Ophelia faces a scandal in the press while Helena suffers a visit from her imperious mother, the Grand Duchess of Oxford.
8	8	"The Great Man Down"	Mark Schwahn	Mark Schwahn	May 3, 2015	1.19
The Royal Family is secured following the attack on the King. Eleanor falls apart while Helena prepares Liam to assume the role of Prince Regent, acting King of England. Cyrus, however, has other ideas.
9	9	"In My Heart There Was a Kind of Fighting"	Tom Vaughan	Mark Schwahn	May 10, 2015	1.17
Declared illegitimate, Liam and Eleanor unravel. Simon remains in critical condition as Cyrus becomes Prince Regent. The circumstances of Robert's death come into question.
10	10	"Our Wills and Fates Do So Contrary Run"	Mark Schwahn	Mark Schwahn	May 17, 2015	1.15
Not knowing that Cyrus manipulated the paternity announcement, Liam asks Ophelia to run away with him. Eleanor drops the charges against Jasper and enlists his aid in meeting Robert's killer. Helena does a television interview. Cyrus finally gets his wish.

=== Season 2 (2015–16) ===
No. overall	No. in season	Title	Directed by	Written by	Original release date	U.S. viewers (millions)
11	1	"It Is Not, nor It Cannot Come to Good"	Mark Schwahn	Mark Schwahn	November 15, 2015	0.84
Cyrus restores Liam and Eleanor's titles in an attempt to secure their allegiance and capitalize on their popularity, while they seek the access that may allow them to destroy Cyrus. Investigating the deaths of his father and brother, Liam enlists the aid of Jasper, who has been following a self-destructive Eleanor to protect her from herself. With the Prime Minister in her power, Helena plots to secure her grasp on the throne.
12	2	"Welcome Is Fashion and Ceremony"	Michael Lange	Mark Schwahn	November 22, 2015	0.73
Beck returns to Eleanor, while Liam and Jasper discover a secret about Cyrus that complicates their investigation.
13	3	"Is Not This Something More Than Fantasy?"	Tom Vaughan	Mark Schwahn	November 29, 2015	0.53
Helena faces off with the Deputy Prime Minister, Liam visits Ophelia in New York and Eleanor must face the inevitable in her rekindled relationship with Beck.
14	4	"What, Has This Thing Appear'd Again Tonight?"	Mark Schwahn	Mark Schwahn	December 6, 2015	0.63
Eleanor escapes her troubles with her new friend Mandy as Cyrus puts a stop to Helena's monument for Simon, which does not sit well with the queen. Liam and Jasper loop in Ted on their investigation of the Domino symbol.
15	5	"The Spirit That I Have Seen"	Tom Vaughan	Julia Cohen	December 13, 2015	0.65
Eleanor and Mandy's relationship goes public, and Helena gets to the bottom of Lacey's disappearance.
16	6	"Doubt Truth to Be a Liar"	Tara Nicole Weyr	Johnny Richardson	December 20, 2015	0.71
As the twins celebrate their birthday, Helena makes a shocking discovery and Mandy's plan comes to fruition.
17	7	"Taint Not Thy Mind, nor Let Thy Soul Contrive Against Thy Mother"	James Lafferty	Scarlett Lacey	December 27, 2015	0.67
Helena confides her past in Eleanor as Liam and Ted each discover the truth about Domino.
18	8	"Be All My Sins Remembered"	Mark Schwahn	Mark Schwahn	January 3, 2016	0.82
Cyrus is devastated when Violet goes missing; Liam and Eleanor confront Helena about Dominique Stewart.
19	9	"And Then It Started Like a Guilty Thing"	Les Butler	Mark Schwahn	January 10, 2016	0.81
Eleanor helps a friend while the Deputy Prime Minister makes Liam an offer, and Jasper finally discovers who murdered Simon.
20	10	"The Serpent That Did Sting Thy Father's Life"	Mark Schwahn	Mark Schwahn	January 17, 2016	0.85
With Ted revealed as Simon's killer, the Royal Family bands together to foil Jeffrey Stewart's plan to destroy them.

=== Season 3 (2016–17) ===
No. overall	No. in season	Title	Directed by	Written by	Original release date	U.S. viewers (millions)
21	1	"Together With Remembrance of Ourselves"	Mark Schwahn	Mark Schwahn	December 4, 2016	0.61
As Helena tries to prove the twins' paternity, Liam feels the guilt of Ted's death. Meanwhile, Robert is alive on a remote island.
22	2	"Passing Through Nature to Eternity"	James Lafferty	Mark Schwahn	December 11, 2016	0.68
Eleanor wants to be exclusive with Jasper, but she is unsure of how to approach it. Helena, Rachel, and her new Lord Chamberlain secure Cyrus' DNA, while Robert grapples with the idea of possibly returning home.
23	3	"Aye, There's the Rub"	Les Butler	Mike Herro & David Strauss	December 18, 2016	0.53
Liam and Eleanor each take their romances to the next level, and the DNA results come in.
24	4	"Our (Late) Dear Brother's Death"	Erica Dunton	Johnny Richardson	January 1, 2017	0.46
Robert's return is good and bad news for Liam. A defeated Cyrus is sparked to action by his ex-wife.
25	5	"Born to Set it Right"	James Lafferty	Scarlett Lacey	January 8, 2017	0.54
Cyrus makes it clear he does not intend to stand aside for Robert, who chooses the diplomatic approach. Jasper is threatened by Beck's return.
26	6	"More Than Kin, and Less Than Kind"	Mark Schwahn	Mark Schwahn	January 15, 2017	0.46
Liam gives the staff the day off for Christmas, and the Royal Family must fend for themselves. Jasper's past catches up to him and threatens his relationship with Eleanor.
27	7	"The Counterfeit Presentment of Two Brothers"	Menhaj Huda	Brian Fernandes	January 22, 2017	0.57
Devastated over her breakup with Jasper, Eleanor focuses on the charity gala, where Kathryn is again compelled to choose Robert over Liam. The brothers' simmering rivalry finally explodes in the boxing ring, while Cyrus blackmails Lord Westcott to ensure that the privy council will vote in favor of him keeping the throne.
28	8	"In the Same Figure, Like the King That's Dead"	Clark Mathis	Mark Schwahn	January 29, 2017	0.50
Eleanor spends the day with Sebastian, and Jasper tries to neutralize Margo with the help of Boone, the man who crashed Robert's plane. Spencer is jealous of Helena's new love interest, and Robert uses Helena to put an end to Liam's aspirations to the throne.
29	9	"O, Farewell, Honest Soldier"	Les Butler	Mark Schwahn	February 12, 2017	0.47
Jasper faces the consequences of his actions while the privy council decides who will be king.
30	10	"To Show My Duty in Your Coronation"	Mark Schwahn	Mark Schwahn	February 19, 2017	0.52
As Robert's coronation arrives, the full extent of his machinations becomes clear. Meanwhile, Jasper makes one last play for Eleanor's heart.

=== Season 4 (2018) ===
No. overall	No. in season	Title	Directed by	Written by	Original release date	U.S. viewers (millions)
31	1	"How Prodigal the Soul"	Mark Schwahn	Mark Schwahn	March 11, 2018	0.50
Jasper and Liam learn of Robert's shocking crime, while Eleanor decides whether to return to England or remain abroad.
32	2	"Confess Yourself to Heaven"	Les Butler	Terrence Coli	March 18, 2018	0.45
Liam goes to Cyrus for help gathering evidence against Robert. With Jasper critically injured, Eleanor waits at his bedside.
33	3	"Seek For thy Noble Father in The Dust"	Clark Mathis	Mark Schwahn	March 25, 2018	0.42
As Eleanor helps the less fortunate, Liam confronts Robert in a shocking way.
34	4	"Black As His Purpose Did The Night Resemble"	Mark Schwahn	Mark Schwahn	April 1, 2018	0.35
As London suffers an extended blackout, Helena is trapped in the wine cellar with her mother and Cyrus; Liam faces the consequences of using Greta; Eleanor steps up to help the populace; and a recovering Jasper is in danger.
35	5	"There's Daggers in Men's Smiles"	James Lafferty	Scarlett Lacey	April 8, 2018	0.39
Robert dissolves Parliament, and Jasper faces off against his con artist father.
36	6	"My News Shall Be The Fruit To That Great Feast"	Erica Dunton	Mark Schwahn	April 15, 2018	0.35
37	7	"Forgive Me This My Virtue"	Clark Mathis	Brian Fernandes	April 22, 2018	0.35
38	8	"In The Dead Vast and Middle of The Night"	James Lafferty	Mark Schwahn	April 29, 2018	0.39
39	9	"Foul Deeds Will Rise"	Les Butler	Mark Schwahn	May 6, 2018	0.39
Liam and Cyrus have a violent confrontation that secures Robert's trust in Liam, though Liam and Cyrus have staged it as part of their ongoing plot against Robert. Helena reveals her own machinations.
40	10	"With Mirth in Funeral and With Dirge in Marriage"	Mark Schwahn	Mark Schwahn	May 13, 2018	0.42
The conspirators plan to publicly expose Robert's crimes during his wedding to Willow.
