= Headline Country =

- Created by: Surfing Moose Productions
- Directed by: Storme Warren, Jeremy Weber
- Presented by: Storme Warren
- Country of origin: United States

Production
- Executive producers: Larry Fitzgerald, Mark Hartley, Storme Warren
- Production locations: Nashville, TN
- Running time: Alternate Thursday Nights, 9 P.M. EST

Original release
- Network: GAC
- Release: January 2009

Headline Country is an American country music news and entertainment show airing on GAC. The show is produced by Surfing Moose Productions.

The show premiered in January 2009 and runs biweekly in 30 minute episodes.

Based in Nashville, TN, "Headline Country" is the only nationally airing television program to cover the world of country music. The show features news, interviews, performances, and various forms of "behind-the-scenes" content.
