= Daniel Lissing =

Australian actor

- Born: Daniel Aaron Lissing; 4 October; Sydney, New South Wales, Australia
- Occupation: Actor
- Years active: 2001–present
- Spouse: Nadia Lissing (m. 2020)

Daniel Aaron Lissing is an Australian actor. He is best known for his role as Jack Thornton in When Calls the Heart (2014–2018). He also had starring roles in the television series Crownies (2011) and Last Resort (2012–2013).

== Career ==
In 2006, he appeared as a guest in the successful Australian series Home and Away where he played the firefighter Dave Elder.

In 2011, he joined the cast of the series Crownies where he played Conrad De Groot, the fiancé of the lawyer Tatum Novak (Indiana Evans), until the end of the series the same year. The same year he appeared in the movie Entwined where he played Aiden.

In 2012, it was announced that he would join the cast of the American series Last Resort as James King, a petty officer of the U.S. Navy, and a Navy SEAL. In the series he appeared with Andre Braugher, Scott Speedman, Autumn Reeser and Daisy Betts.

That same year he joined the cast of the movie The Cure where he played the role of Ryan Earl, a member of a research team that he feels he deserves greater recognition and fame.

In September 2014, he joined the cast of MTV's thriller series Eye Candy. He played the main role of Ben Miller, a detective, who worked with and falls in love with Lindy (Victoria Justice). The series is about a genius (Justice) who realizes that her online suitor is a dangerous cyber stalker. His character was killed off after two episodes.

From 2014 to 2018, Lissing appeared in the Hallmark Channel series When Calls the Heart as Canadian Mountie Jack Thornton. He chose to leave the role at the end of Season 5 and his character was killed off. Lissing reprised his role as Jack Thornton for a cameo appearance in When Hope Calls: A Country Christmas in late 2021.

In 2016, Lissing appeared alongside Jessica Lowndes in Hallmark Channel's A December Bride as the character Seth. In 2018, he and Brooke D'Orsay starred in the channel's film Christmas in Love. Lissing stars alongside Rhiannon Fish in the 2026 Hallmark film Aussie at Heart, which is set in Queensland.

== Personal life ==
Lissing is Jewish. He married his wife Nadia in early 2020. In 2020, Lissing achieved dual citizenship in Australia and the United States.

== Filmography ==
=== Film ===
Year	Title	Role	Notes
2000	”Looking for Alibrandi”	Extra	Movie
2009	Whiteline	Matt	Short
2009	Multiple Choice	Mark	Short
2010	The Game	James	Short
2011	Fidelity	Sam	Short
2011	Entwined	Aiden	Short
2014	The Cure	Ryan Earl	
2014	John Doe: Vigilante	Jake	
2015	The Answers	Nathan	Short

=== Television ===
Year	Title	Role	Notes
2001	Pizza	Cop	"Girlfriend Pizza"
2006	Home and Away	Dave Elder	"1.4237", "1.4241"
2008	Out of the Blue	Angus 'Tiger' McKinnon	"1.17", "1.49", "1.60"
2008–2009	Packed to the Rafters	Heath	"Taking the Lead", "Over the Moon"
2009	Underbelly: A Tale of Two Cities	Jogger	"A Nice Little Earner"
2010	Cops L.A.C.	Ryan	"A Veil of Tears"
2011	Crownies	Conrad De Groot	Recurring role; 17 episodes
2012–2013	Last Resort	James King	Main role; 13 episodes
2014–2018	When Calls the Heart	Jack Thornton	Main role (Seasons 1–5); 44 episodes
2015	Eye Candy	Ben Miller	"K3U", "AMA"
2015–2016	Girlfriends' Guide to Divorce	Payton	"58", "14", "81"
2016	A December Bride	Seth Murphy	TV film (Hallmark)
2017	Timeless	Jesse James	"The Murder of Jesse James"
2017	Blindspot	Tom Jakeman	"Enemy Bag of Tricks"
2018–2019	S.W.A.T.	Ty	Recurring role; 5 episodes
2018	Christmas In Love	Nick Carlingson	TV film (Hallmark)
2019–2020	The Rookie	Sterling Freeman	Episodes: "Breaking Point", "Now and Then", "True Crime"
2021	A Christmas Star	Ryan Sparks	TV film (Great American Family)
2021	When Hope Calls	Jack Thornton	Episode: "A Country Christmas Part 2".
2022	The Cleaning Lady	Brandon	Episodes: "TNT" and "Kabayan"
2022	Catering Christmas	Carson Jacob Harrison	TV film (Great American Family)
2023	Christmas Keepsake	Tom	TV film (Great American Family)
2024	Santa Tell Me	Chris Davis	TV film (Hallmark)
2025	Single on the 25th	Cooper	TV film (Hallmark)
2026	Christmas Under Construction	Cooper	TV film (Hallmark)
