= The Cure (2014 film) =

- Theatrical release poster
- Directed by: David Gould
- Written by: David Gould
- Produced by: David Gould
- Starring: Antonia Prebble; Stephen Lovatt; Daniel Lissing; John Bach; John Landreth
- Cinematography: David Paul
- Music by: Daniel Sadowski
- Production companies: CineTel Films; David Gould Studios
- Distributed by: CineTel Films (U.S.)
- Release date: 6 February 2014
- Running time: 90 minutes
- Countries: New Zealand; United States
- Language: English
- Budget: NZD 2,250,000

The Cure is a 2014 thriller starring Antonia Prebble and Daniel Lissing about a research scientist who discovers the company she works for has developed a cure for cancer. It was written, directed and produced by David Gould.

== Plot ==
Researcher Beth Wakefield (Prebble) works for ScopaMed Pharmaceuticals. She accidentally discovers the pharmaceutical company she works for had developed a cure for cancer many years earlier. They have not released it because that would destroy their chemotherapy drug sales. She must now escape and release the cure to the world while the company tries to stop her.

== Cast ==
- Antonia Prebble as Beth Wakefield
- Stephen Lovatt as Ted Garner
- Daniel Lissing as Ryan Earl
- John Bach as Lionel Stanton
- John Landreth as Wentworth
- Nathalie Boltt as Ruby Wakefield
- Paul Yates as Mason Wakefield
- Craig Geenty as Rob
- Simon Vincent as Grant
- Lolo Owen as young Beth Wakefield
