= Jen Lilley =

American actress and singer (born 1984)

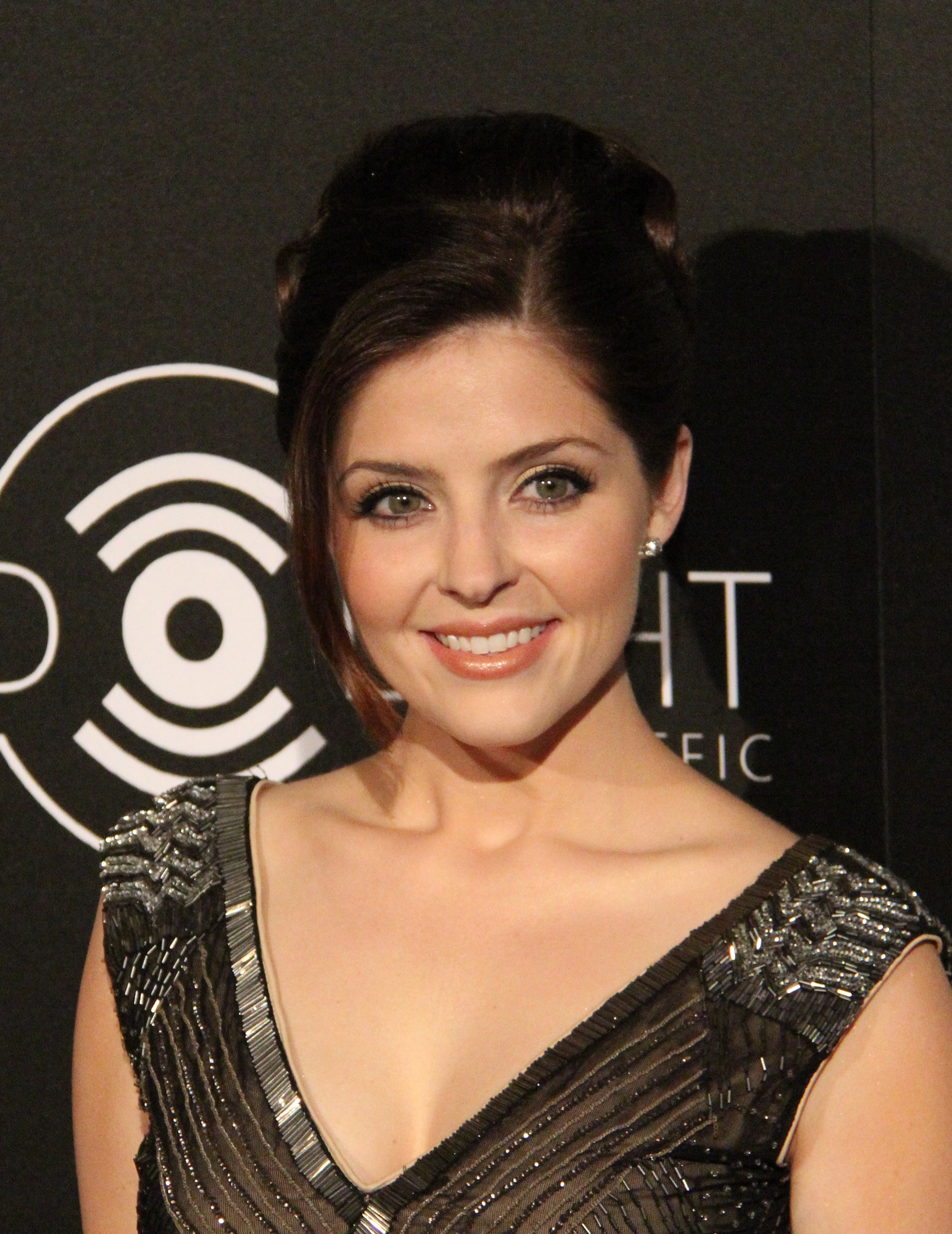
- Lilley in 2013
- Born: Jennifer Lilley; August 4, 1984 (age 42); Roanoke, Virginia, U.S.
- Education: University of Virginia
- Occupations: Actress, singer
- Years active: 2007–present
- Spouse: Jason Wayne (m. 2007)
- Children: 4

Jennifer Lilley (born August 4, 1984) is an American actress and singer. Lilley played a supporting role in the 2011 film The Artist, temporarily portrayed Maxie Jones on the ABC soap opera General Hospital from September 2011 to August 2012, and has played the character of Theresa Donovan on NBC's soap opera Days of Our Lives from July 2013 to November 2016 and again from May to July 2018. She has also starred in several television films from Hallmark Channel and Great American Family Channel.

In March 2024, Lilley was awarded the Childhelp Inspirational Award along with Ale Boggiano for their work with Christmas Is Not Cancelled.

In 2025, Lilley and Billy Hallowell launched the podcast Into the Supernatural.

== Early life ==
Lilley was born in Roanoke, Virginia to Ellen and Vincent Lilley. She is the second oldest of four children. She has two brothers, Michael and Ryan, and one sister, Katherine. Lilley graduated from Cave Spring High School. She went on to attend the University of Virginia and graduated early with magna cum laude honors.

== Career ==
=== Acting ===
In 2011, Lilley had a supporting role in director Michel Hazanavicius's silent movie The Artist, which won five Academy Awards including Best Picture. She also appeared as Monie in the iCarly TV movie, "iParty with Victorious".

In autumn of 2011, Lilley took over the role of Maxie Jones, as a temporary recast for Kirsten Storms on General Hospital while she was on medical leave for endometriosis. She made her on-screen debut on September 28, 2011. In August 2012, Lilley confirmed that she had finished taping and made her on-screen exit on August 20, 2012; Storms later returned on September 5.

In April 2013, Lilley joined the cast of Days of Our Lives as a newly created character. She made her on-screen debut as Theresa Donovan on July 3, 2013. Lilley was a principal cast member when Days of Our Lives won the Daytime Emmy for Outstanding Drama Series. In June 2016, she confirmed she was exiting the soap due to the demanding filming schedule hindering her ability to pursue other commitments and opportunities. Lilley reprised her portrayal as Theresa in May–July 2018.

In November 2016, Lilley appeared in a film for the Hallmark Channel titled A Dash of Love. In June 2018, she played Charlotte in the Hallmark Channel film Yes, I Do, followed later that same year by playing Molly in the Hallmark Channel holiday film Mingle All the Way. In 2022, Lilley ended her association with Hallmark Channel, and signed a four-film deal with GAC Media, the owners of Great American Family channel.

=== Singing ===
In the summer of 2014, Lilley traveled to Georgia, where she hosted and sang in a benefit concert with SOWEGA Art Performance to raise funds for ONEless Ministries, and in December of the same year, sang at the 3rd Annual Westchester All Stars Christmas for Wounded Veterans Concert in New York.

On November 24, 2015, Lilley released her first Christmas album, "Tinsel Time". The album's title track premiered on TV Guide's TV Insider. On October 5, 2018, Lilley debuted her studio single, "King of Hearts" from her forthcoming album, Lilley.

== Personal life ==
On May 26, 2007, Lilley married Jason Wayne. In 2016, Lilley and her husband became foster parents through the organization, Childhelp. In June 2019, Lilley and Wayne adopted their two foster sons and in July 2019, she gave birth to a daughter. In May 2022, Lilley gave birth to the couple's fourth child, another daughter.

== Filmography ==
=== Film ===
Year	Title	Role	Notes
2008	Changeling	Switchboard Operator	
2009	Robinson Crusoe: The Great Blitzkrieg	Robinson's Computer	Video
2009	A Step Toward Heaven	Wife	Short
2009	Flicker	Lydia	Short
2010	Fiddler in the Darkness	Lisa Coryelle	Short
2011	Head Over Spurs in Love	Daisy Spur	
2011	Obsolescence	Obsolescence	Short
2011	The Artist	On-looker	
2011	The Sticky Chocolate Kingdom	Audrey	Short
2011	iParty with Victorious	Monie	TV movie
2012	Love Refreshed	Angel	Short
2012	The Olivia Experiment	Felicia	
2013	Isolated	Ambassador for Peace	
2013	One Small Hitch	Larissa	
2013	Revelation Road: The Beginning of the End	Rachel McManus	
2013	The Book of Esther	Esther	
2013	Revelation Road 2: The Sea of Glass and Fire	Rachel McManus	
2014	Turn Around Jake	Jessica Henry	
2015	The Spirit of Christmas	Kate Jordan	TV movie
2016	Where Are You, Bobby Browning?	Patsy	
2016	Crossing Streets	Cate Anderson	
2017	Mommy, I Didn't Do It	Kimberly Bains	TV movie
2017	A Dash of Love	Nikki Turner	TV movie
2017	Eat, Play, Love	Dr. Carly Monroe	TV movie
2017	Harvest Love	Luna Gilson	TV movie
2018	Snatched	Aubrey Lewis	TV movie
2018	Off the Menu	Lauren	
2018	The Wedding Do Over	Sandy Brantwell	TV movie
2018	Twin Betrayal	Jessica & Alessandra	TV movie
2018	Yes, I Do	Charlotte	TV movie
2018	Mingle All the Way	Molly Hoffman	TV movie
2019	Winter Love Story	Cassie	TV movie
2019	Paris, Wine & Romance	Isabella Ricci	TV movie
2019	Love Unleashed	Hailey Goode	TV movie
2019	Love on Repeat	Amber	TV movie
2019	Angel Falls: A Novel Holiday	Hannah Pressman	TV movie
2020	USS Christmas	Maddie Contino	TV movie
2021	Snowkissed	Kate Daniels	TV movie
2021	A Little Daytime Drama	Maggie Coleman	TV movie
2021	Royally Wrapped for Christmas	Lindsay Peterson	TV movie
2022	Where Your Heart Belongs	Mackenzie Sullivan	TV movie
2022	B&B Merry	Tracey Wise	TV movie
2023	Paris Christmas Waltz	Emma Harris	TV movie
2024	Operation Mistletoe	Grace	TV movie
2026	A Royal Setting	Ruby	TV movie
2026	Jimmy	Gloria Stewart	

=== Television ===
Year	Title	Role	Notes
2007	Hannah Montana	Swimsuit Model	Episode: "That's What Friends are For"
2008	Two and a Half Men	Bridesmaid #4	Episode: "Rough Night in Hump Junction"
2008	Ingles Ya!	Sirena/Mandy	Main Cast
2009	Criminal Minds	Megan Chertow	Episode: "The Eyes Have It"
2010	Castle	Julia Foster	Episode: "Punked"
2011	Rules of Engagement	Barista	Episode: "The Power Couple"
2011	Disaster Date	Herself	Recurring Cast: Season 4
2011	PrankStars	Herself	Episode: "Something to Chew On"
2011–12	General Hospital	Maxie Jones	Regular Cast
2013	The Crazy Ones	Claire	Episode: "Bad Dad"
2013	The Dark Knight Retires	Carly	Recurring Cast
2013–23	Days of Our Lives	Theresa Donovan	Regular Cast
2014	Dating in LA and Other Urban Myths	Chloe	Main Cast
2014–15	Youthful Daze	Natalie Cardin	Main Cast: Season 3, Recurring Cast: Season 4
2016	Grey's Anatomy	Kara	Episode: "I Ain’t No Miracle Worker"
2016	The Encounter	Nora Huber	Episode: "Just Believe"
2023	Chicago Med	Jodie Dunner	Episode: "It Is What It Is, Until It Isn't"

== Awards and nominations ==
Year	Association	Category	Work	Result	Ref.
2014	Indie Series Awards	Best Lead Actress – Drama	Youthful Daze	Nominated	
2024	Movieguide Awards	Epiphany Prize	Paris Christmas Waltz	Nominated	
2024	Movieguide Awards	Best Television Episode for Families	Paris Christmas Waltz	Won	
2025	Movieguide Awards	Best Television Episode for Families	A Little Women’s Christmas	Won	

=== Humanitarian & Advocacy Awards ===
- 2024: Childhelp Inspirational Award - For her work with Christmas Is Not Cancelled and national child advocacy
- 2024: Childhelp For the Love of a Child Award - Presented in recognition of extraordinary compassion and impact in the lives of at-risk youth
- 2023: Barbara Harrison Award Presented by: Comfort Cases - For improving the lives of children in foster care
- 2023: Community Achievement Award Presented by: Junior League of Los Angeles - For philanthropic work supporting foster youth and her initiative Christmas Is Not Canceled
- 2022: Toys for Tots Recognition - Honored for her outstanding charity work serving children and families in need
- 2020: Childhelp Children's Friend Award - Recognizing her commitment to children in foster care and abuse prevention
- 2019: Happy Trails Super Star Award - Recognizing her ongoing efforts in foster care and child advocacy
- 2018: Childhelp Sweetheart Award - Honoring her early dedication to child welfare and loving advocacy
- 2001: National Educators Award – Guatemala - For performing concerts for underprivileged Guatemalan youth
