= William J. Abbott =

American businessman and CEO of Crown Media

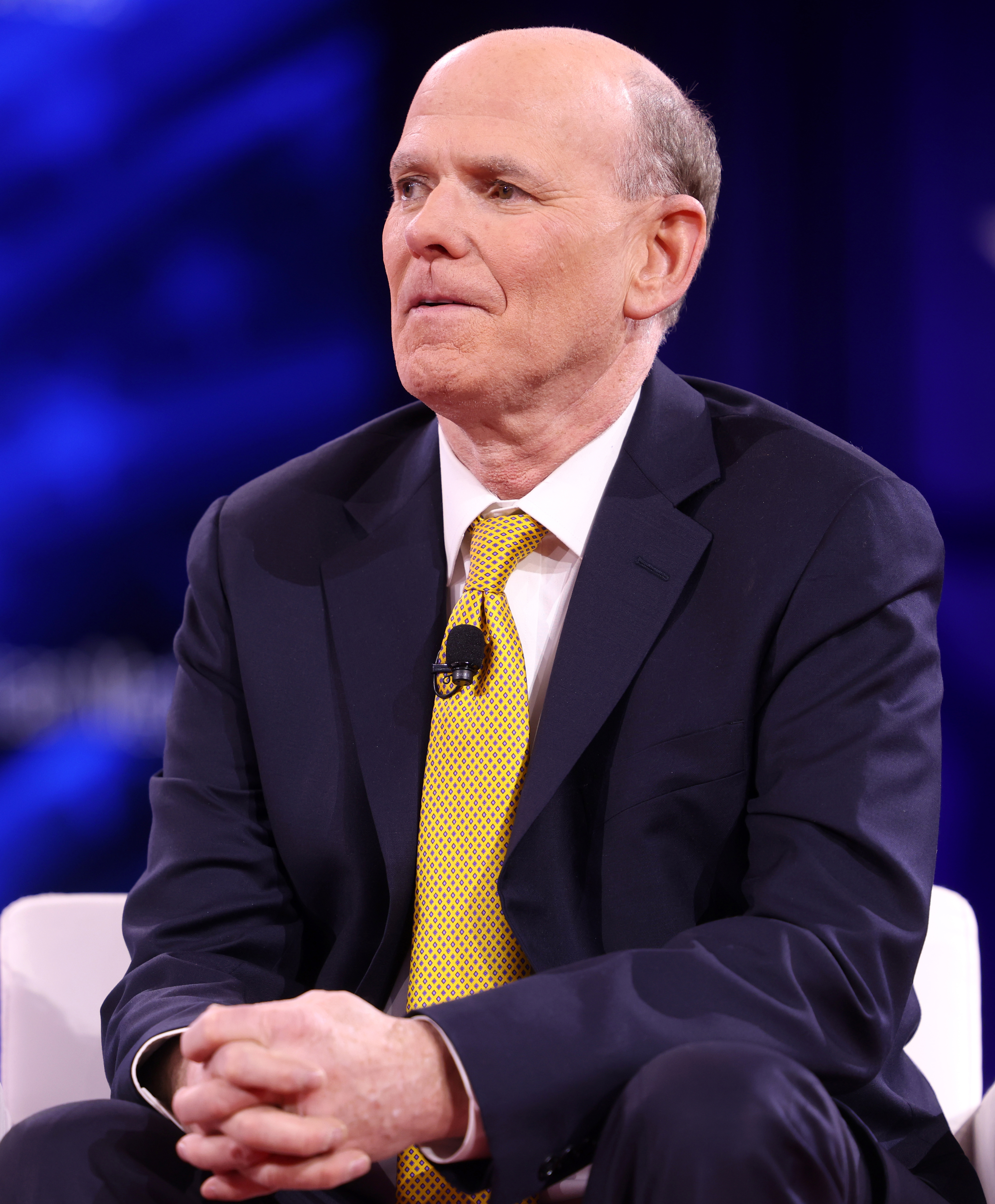
- Abbott in 2025
- Born: April 25, 1962 (age 64); Manhasset, New York, U.S.
- Education: College of the Holy Cross (BA)
- Title: CEO of Crown Media Family Networks (2009–2020); President and CEO of Great American Media (2021–present); CEO of Pure Flix (2023–present)
- Spouse: Shannon
- Children: 4
- Awards: Cablefax 100 (2009–2016)

William J. "Bill" Abbott (born April 25, 1962) is an American businessman and media executive. He has been the president and chief executive officer (CEO) of the media company Great American Media since 2021. He was previously the president and CEO of Crown Media, the parent company of Hallmark Channel and Hallmark Movies & Mysteries, from 2009 to 2020.

When he became the head of Crown Media in 2009, Abbott spearheaded the addition of scripted series for primetime, including Cedar Cove and When Calls the Heart, as well as the launch of the yearly special Kitten Bowl.

== Early life and education ==
Abbott was born in Manhasset, New York, on April 25, 1962. He was raised on Long Island, New York. His father, William Abbott, was an advertising executive at Condé Nast. He graduated from the College of the Holy Cross in Worcester, Massachusetts, with a Bachelor of Arts in English literature in 1984.

== Early career ==
After graduating from Holy Cross, Abbott entered the media industry at the advertising agency Nadler & Larimer, his first job after college. Finding agency work unsuitable for him, he moved to Seltel, a television-station representation firm, where he worked as a researcher analyzing multiple television markets. He also worked as a researcher at CBS Radio Networks.

In 1988, Abbott joined the newly-renamed television channel The Family Channel. While at The Family Channel, he moved from research into advertising sales and subsequently advanced through the network's sales organization. After The Family Channel was sold to Fox Kids Worldwide in 1997, Abbott became senior vice president of advertising sales for both the cable network Fox Family Channel and the broadcast Fox Kids network. In that position, he worked with television executive Margaret Loesch. He was the senior vice president of advertising sales for Fox Family Worldwide from January 1997 until January 2000. As senior vice president, he was responsible for advertising and research for Fox Family Channel and the Fox Kids broadcast network.

== Media executive (2000–present) ==
=== Crown Media ===
In January 2000, Abbott left Fox Family Worldwide and joined Crown Media Holdings as executive vice president of advertising sales. There, he led the national advertising sales operations for the networks, internet services and digital network development and oversaw its offices in New York, Los Angeles, Chicago and Atlanta. In 2004, he oversaw the launch of Hallmark Movie Channel. During his tenure as EVP of advertising sales, Hallmark Channel's annual advertising revenue increased from $10.2 million to $223 million.

==== As CEO ====
Abbott succeeded Henry Schleiff as president and CEO of Crown Media, June 1, 2009. In his first year, Abbott made a deal with Martha Stewart to create a lifestyle block on Hallmark Channel that premiered in March 2010. The following year, Abbott launched Hallmark's "Countdown to Christmas" campaign, and in 2015 featured Mariah Carey in her directorial debut in A Christmas Melody, with 17 new original movies.

In 2012, he revived the daytime Emmy-nominated lifestyle program The Home and Family Show. Abbott also diversified and expanded the network's content to include primetime scripted series including Cedar Cove and When Calls the Heart, an honoree of the 2016 Christopher Spirit Award. Separately, he oversaw the 2014 rebranding of Hallmark Movie Channel to Hallmark Movies & Mysteries.

In January 2020, Abbott stepped down as CEO of Crown Media, a little more than a month after the network apologized for removing advertisements featuring same-sex couples from the air which were restored a few days after being removed.

=== Great American Media ===
In June 2021, Abbott became a partner with Hicks Equity Partners on GAC Media, a newly formed media company that acquired the cable channels Great American Country and Ride TV. GAC was relaunched as GAC Family in September 2021, repositioning it as a family-oriented network with a similar format to Hallmark Channel. The network acquired the When Calls the Heart spin-off When Hope Calls, and began hiring talent associated with Hallmark Channel productions to appear in its own competing slate of made-for-TV movies (with the channel establishing "Great American Christmas" as a direct competitor to Hallmark's Countdown to Christmas lineup).

In 2023, Abbott became CEO of Pure Flix after its merger with Great American Media. The merger brought together the companies' streaming and cable operations focused on faith- and family-based entertainment.

== Awards and honors ==
Abbott was featured in the Cablefax 100 list of top power players every year from 2009 through 2016. He also received the Diversity Partner Award from the T. Howard Foundation in 2016.

== Personal life ==
He has been married more than once and has four children; his eldest daughter is from his first marriage.
