= The Royals (TV series) =

American television drama series

- Genre: Drama; Soap opera
- Created by: Mark Schwahn
- Based on: Falling for Hamlet by Michelle Ray
- Starring: Elizabeth Hurley; William Moseley; Alexandra Park; Tom Austen; Merritt Patterson; Jake Maskall; Oliver Milburn; Vincent Regan; Max Brown; Genevieve Gaunt
- Theme music composer: Siddhartha Khosla
- Country of origin: United States
- Original language: English
- No. of seasons: 4
- No. of episodes: 40 (list of episodes)

Production
- Executive producers: Mark Schwahn; Brian Robbins; Joe Davola; Shauna Phelan
- Producers: Annabelle Frost; Sam Breckman; Nick O'Hagen
- Production locations: London, England
- Cinematography: Nick Dance; John Rhodes; Robert McGregor
- Editors: Dan Robinson; Jeremy Strachan; Brian Berdan
- Running time: 42 minutes (approx.)
- Production companies: Mastermind Laboratories; Varsity Pictures; Lionsgate Television; Universal Cable Productions

Original release
- Network: E!
- Release: March 15, 2015 – May 13, 2018

The Royals is an American primetime television drama soap opera that premiered on E! on March 15, 2015. Created by Mark Schwahn and starring Elizabeth Hurley, it is the network's first scripted series. It began as a loose adaptation of the 2011 Michelle Ray novel Falling for Hamlet. E! renewed it for a second season two months before its debut, and picked up a third season on January 5, 2016. E! renewed it for a fourth season on February 16, 2017, which began airing on March 11, 2018. E! cancelled the series after four seasons in August 2018. Lionsgate Television was shopping the series to other networks with discussions for a pick-up by sister network Pop, but on September 24, Lionsgate failed to find a new home for the series and it was officially cancelled.

Hurley stars as Queen Helena, a fictional contemporary queen consort of The United Kingdom, along with William Moseley and Alexandra Park as her twin children, Prince Liam and Princess Eleanor; Jake Maskall as Helena's brother-in-law and nemesis, the new King Cyrus; Tom Austen as Eleanor's bodyguard and blackmailer, Jasper Frost; and Oliver Milburn as Ted Pryce, the Royal Family's head of security. Season 1 also starred Vincent Regan as Helena's husband, King Simon, and Merritt Patterson as Liam's love interest, Ophelia Pryce.

== Plot summary ==
Helena is the matriarch of a fictional contemporary British royal family who must struggle with both common and atypical family dramas while in the public eye. Twins Prince Liam and Princess Eleanor enjoy the hedonistic pleasures available to them as royals, knowing that their older brother Robert bears the responsibility of being heir to the throne of England. But when Robert is killed, the family is thrown into disarray and a grieving King Simon fears for the future of the monarchy. Unexpectedly next in line for the throne, Liam must adjust to his new role while navigating his attraction to Ophelia, the American daughter of the royal head of security. His self-destructive sister Eleanor finds rock-bottom when her bodyguard turns out to be a conman. Trying to preserve the status quo and keep the royal family under her control, Queen Helena allies herself with Simon's brother Cyrus to preserve their way of life at any cost.

== Cast ==
=== Main ===
Actor	Role	Description	Seasons			
Actor	Role	Description	1	2	3	4
Elizabeth Hurley	Queen Helena Henstridge	Simon's wife, the Queen of The United Kingdom and later the Queen Mother in season 3	Main	Main	Main	Main
Vincent Regan	King Simon Henstridge	King of The United Kingdom; he dies at the end of season 1 and is initially succeeded by his brother when his surviving children are deemed illegitimate.	Main	Recurring	Guest	Guest
William Moseley	Prince Liam Henstridge	Simon and Helena's second son, twin to Eleanor and heir to the throne after his elder brother Robert is killed	Main	Main	Main	Main
Alexandra Park	Princess Eleanor Henstridge	Liam's twin sister	Main	Main	Main	Main
Jake Maskall	Prince Cyrus Henstridge	Simon's brother the Duke of York, who succeeds him as king in season 2 but is removed in season 3 when Simon's presumed-dead son Robert reappears.	Main	Main	Main	Main
Tom Austen	Sir Jasper Frost	Royal bodyguard and Eleanor's on-again, off-again boyfriend. He is knighted by Robert in season 4.	Main	Main	Main	Main
Oliver Milburn	Ted Pryce	Head of royal security in seasons 1 and 2, and Ophelia's father	Main	Main		
Merritt Patterson	Ophelia Pryce	Liam's love interest in season 1, and daughter of Ted Pryce	Main	Guest		
Genevieve Gaunt	Wilhelmina "Willow" Moreno	A friend of Liam's who is later hired by Helena to be the family's social media manager. At the end of season 4 she marries Robert, and becomes queen.		Recurring	Main	Main
Max Brown	King Robert Henstridge	Simon and Helena's eldest son and heir to the throne; he is thought to have been killed in a plane crash, but he reappears in season 3 and ascends the throne. He marries Willow at the end of season 4.			Main	Main

=== Recurring ===
Actor	Role	Description	Seasons			
Actor	Role	Description	1	2	3	4
Victoria Ekanoye	Rachel	Helena's secretary	Recurring	Recurring	Recurring	Recurring
Lydia Rose Bewley	Princess Penelope Henstridge	Cyrus's older daughter	Recurring	Recurring		
Hatty Preston (season 1); Jerry-Jane Pears (season 2)	Princess Maribel Henstridge	Cyrus's younger daughter	Recurring	Recurring		
Andrew Bicknell	Lucius	Secretary to Helena and later Cyrus	Recurring	Recurring		Guest
Poppy Corby-Tuech	Prudence	A palace servant who becomes involved with Cyrus	Recurring	Recurring		
Manpreet Bachu	Ashok	Liam's friend	Recurring	Recurring		
Scott Maslen	James Holloway	A married politician and Cyrus's male sometimes-lover	Recurring	Recurring		
Simon Thomas	Nigel Moorefield	A politician and leader of the anti-monarchy movement	Recurring	Recurring		
Andrew Cooper	Lord Twysden "Beck" Beckwith II	Best friend of Robert, longtime friend of Liam and love interest of Eleanor	Guest	Recurring	Guest	
Joan Collins	Grand Duchess Alexandra of Oxford	Helena's mother	Guest	Recurring		Recurring
Thomas Christian	Brandon Boone	A mercenary responsible for Robert's plane crash	Recurring	Guest	Guest	Guest
Leanne Joyce	Imogen	A girl Eleanor befriends after touring a rehab center	Guest	Recurring		
Tom Ainsley	Nick Roane	Ophelia's classmate and love interest	Recurring	Guest		
Noah Huntley	Captain Alistair Lacey	Helena's lover	Recurring	Guest		
Ukweli Roach	Marcus Jeffrys	Liam's bodyguard and confidante	Recurring			
Sophie Colquhoun	Gemma Kensington	Liam's jewelry-heiress ex-girlfriend	Recurring			
Rocky Marshall	James Hill	Eleanor's newest bodyguard, later head of royal security		Recurring	Recurring	Recurring
Tanveer Ghani	Crenshaw	A reporter		Recurring	Recurring	Guest
Matthew Wolf	Jeffrey Stewart	Dominique Stewart's brother		Recurring	Guest	
Laila Rouass	Rani	The Deputy Prime Minister		Recurring		
Stephanie Vogt	Daphne Pryce	Ted's deceased wife		Recurring		
Sarah Dumont	Mandy/Samantha Cook	Eleanor's American friend who shares a past with Jasper		Recurring		
Keeley Hazell	Violet	A palace maid who is kind to Cyrus as he convalesces		Recurring		Guest
Ben Cura	Holden Avery	Liam's friend and Ivan's brother		Recurring		
Alex Felton	Ivan Avery	Liam's friend and Holden's brother		Recurring		
Jules Knight	Spencer Hoenigsberg	The Lord Chamberlain			Recurring	
Miley Locke	Sara Alice Hill	James Hill's daughter			Recurring	Guest
Christina Wolfe	Kathryn Davis	Bartender friend and love interest of Liam, previously involved with Robert			Recurring	Recurring
Tom Forbes	Charles Madden	Liam's friend			Recurring	
Aoife McMahon	Veruca Popperwell, Duchess of Essex	Cyrus's ex-wife and the mother of his daughters			Recurring	
Toby Sandeman	Prince Sebastian Idrisi	Eleanor's charity auction date who becomes a friend and confidante			Recurring	Recurring
Margo Stilley	Harper	An unscrupulous American reporter			Recurring	Guest
Damian Hurley	Prince Hansel von Liechtenstein	Crown Prince of Liechtenstein, and Helena's favourite reality television star			Guest	Guest
Andrew Steele	Colin Yorke	A politician with whom Helena rekindles a past affair				Recurring
Emily Barber	Cassandra Von Halen	A candidate on the King's list of potential brides				Recurring
Richard Brake	Earl Frost	Jasper's father, a con man				Recurring
Nina Young	Felicity Moreno	Willow's mother				Guest

== Production ==
=== Development ===
Season 1 cast

In April 2013, E! announced several scripted projects in development, including The Royals, "a contemporary family ensemble… steeped in all of the regal opulence of the British Monarchy and framed by Shakespeare's Hamlet." Deadline Hollywood reported in June 2013 that E! would produce pilots for The Royals and another series named Songbyrd, which would be its first scripted pilots to date. The Royals was picked up for series in March 2014, to be shot in the United Kingdom and scheduled to debut in 2015. Shooting for the first season began in London in June 2014. In August 2014, E! released its first promotional trailer. The first season consisted of ten episodes.

In December 2014, E! announced that the series would premiere on March 15, 2015. It later announced at the Television Critics Association press tour on January 15, 2015 that the series was renewed for a second season, two months before its debut. E!'s Executive Vice President of Original Programming & Development Jeff Olde noted that production for season two would begin in London in spring 2015. Shooting officially resumed on June 15, 2015, with season two premiering on November 15, 2015. On January 5, 2016, E! renewed The Royals for a third season, which premiered on December 4, 2016. Several days before the season three finale, the series was renewed for a fourth season on February 16, 2017, which premiered on March 11, 2018.

Schwahn was suspended from the series after the completion of season four filming on November 15, 2017, following sexual harassment allegations by female cast and crew of both The Royals and his previous series, One Tree Hill, came to light. He was subsequently fired from the series on December 22, 2017. On August 16, 2018, it was announced that E! had canceled the series after four seasons. It was reported that Lionsgate Television was shopping the series to other networks, with discussions already underway for a pick-up by sister network Pop. However on September 24, 2018, it was announced that Lionsgate had failed to find a new home for the series and that it was now considered officially ended.

The production uses Blenheim Palace as its fictional royal palace. In season two, the production also filmed at Allington Castle and Boughton Monchelsea Place in Kent. Various scenes were filmed at The Historic Dockyard Chatham in Kent in June 2017 for episode 4, season four. The locations used there included The Tarred Yarn Store, HMS Cavalier, Commissioner's House garden and the Ropery Tunnels. Chapel Place in Tunbridge Wells was also featured as part of a royal wedding.

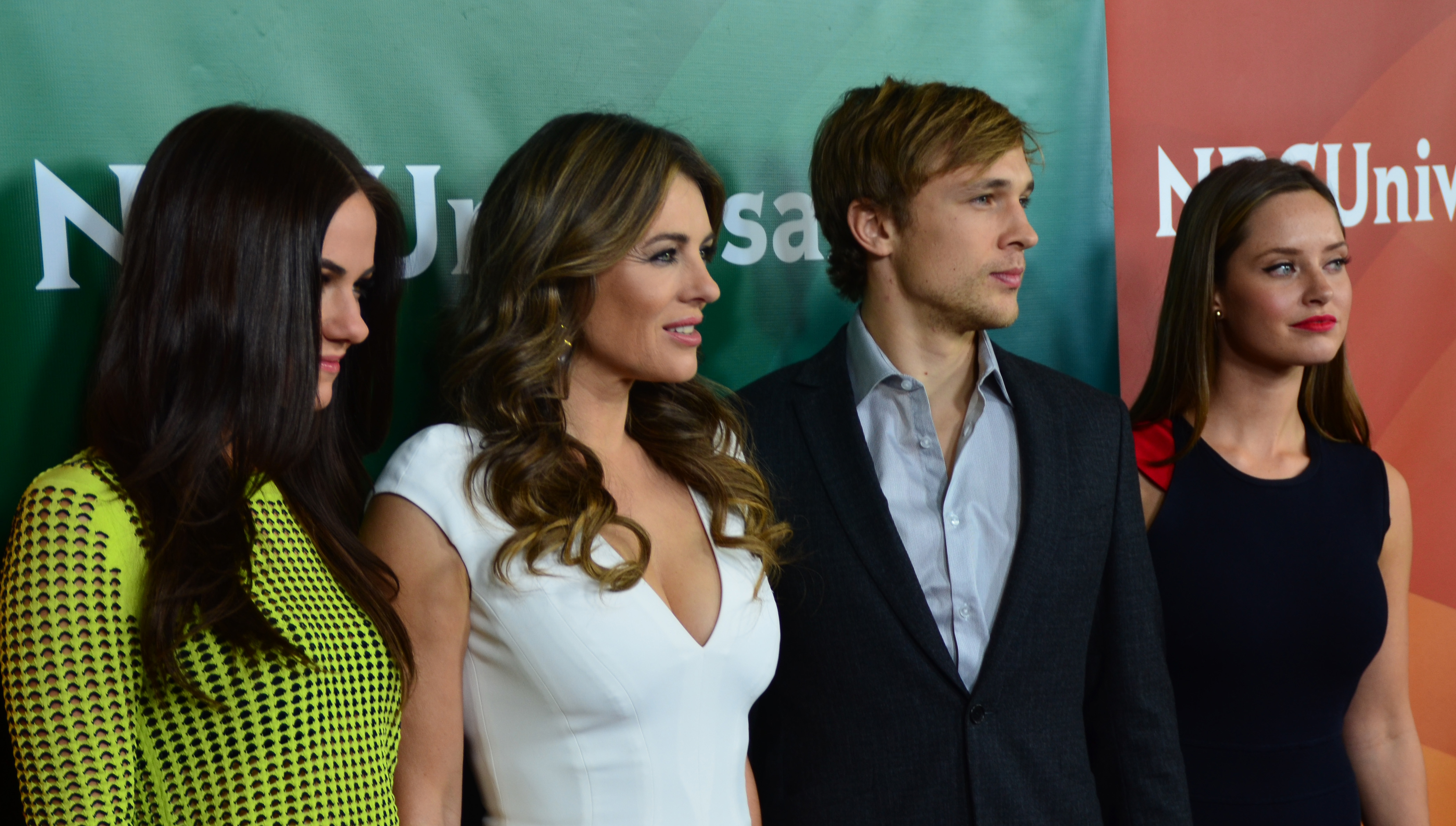
(L to R) Park, Hurley, Moseley and Patterson at the 2015 Television Critics Association's Press Tour

Some scenes in the show were also filmed at Wrest Park in Bedfordshire.

=== Casting ===
In September 2013, Hurley was cast in the leading role of Queen Helena. Soon after, Moseley was cast as Helena's son Liam, followed by Park as Liam's twin sister Eleanor and Haley Lu Richardson as his love interest, Ophelia. The rest of the pilot's cast included Regan, Austen, Maskall, Roach and Milburn. After the series pickup, Merritt Patterson replaced Richardson as Ophelia in June 2014, as shooting for the first season began in London. Additional recurring roles included Bewley and Preston as Cyrus' eccentric daughters Penelope and Maribel, and Colquhoun as Gemma, Liam's heiress ex-girlfriend. In August 2014, People reported that Joan Collins would guest star as the Grand Duchess of Oxford, Helena's mother.

In June 2015, Laila Rouass was cast as Rani, the Deputy Prime Minister whom the actress calls "Elizabeth Hurley's arch-enemy". For season 2, Hatty Preston was replaced as Princess Maribel with Jerry-Jane Pears, the difference in their appearance explained by plastic surgery.

In June 2016, Max Brown was cast as Prince Robert, the presumed-dead eldest son of Simon and Helena, and Jules Knight was cast as Spencer Koenigsberg, Helena's new Lord Chamberlain. Genevieve Gaunt, who played Liam's potential love interest Willow in season 2, was also promoted from recurring to series regular for season 3. Hurley's son Damian Hurley was cast in a guest star role in July 2016.

=== Concept and characterization ===
The Royals is loosely based on the Michelle Ray novel Falling for Hamlet. Alessandra Stanley of The New York Times described the show as "a tongue-in-cheek nighttime soap" and "a Dynasty about a real dynasty". Creator Schwahn said of the series, "It's a family drama. It's about a family, and it just happens to be a royal family ... [but] not the royal family." Hurley called The Royals "a very nice combination of what the public sees and what the public will never see." Of the concept, Schwahn said:

I just thought it would be really interesting to take a look behind the curtain ... Who are these people? What do they want? What will they do to get it? I thought it was really fascinating and a great idea for the foundation of a story.

Schwahn said of Hurley, "I tell her every day that this was the role that she was meant to play ... she has found her lot in life" Of her character, Hurley commented "this queen is very matriarchal ... she has a lot of power and I think she knows how to use it." She noted, however, that "there's no correlation at all between Her Majesty Queen Elizabeth and my Queen Helena... If Princess Diana, for example, had become queen of England, that would be a more similar age group." Hurley later said that the character of Helena was inspired by Diana, but "some of it we picked from Cruella de Vil, the Disney character." Noting that "most of the characters on The Royals are going to be walking a fine line between 'good' and 'bad'," Schwahn said:

Elizabeth has been very brave in approaching the more villainous aspects of the character ... I was working with Elizabeth on wardrobe and she asked, 'Why not add in bits of fur? I think the queen should wear bits of cruelty once in a while.'

Regan said of his character, the "soft-spoken" King Simon: "He's coping with a great deal of grief for the loss of his eldest son, Robert ... He's coping with that and trying to work out how the royal family can exist in the world they're now in." Moseley commented on his own storyline as playboy Prince Liam, "it's like (if) Prince Harry was thrown into being the next King of England." "He basically is sort of a rebel ... doesn't really care what anybody thinks, does whatever he wants to do, when he wants to do it," he later added. Park said of her wild Princess Eleanor, "she's young and trying to find where her place is in the world. She's a party girl." Austen said of bodyguard Jasper, "He's a very mysterious character ... you never know what to expect from him. There's a lot of stuff that only Mark [Schwahn] and me know about, so there's a lot of secrets on set." Calling the show "uncompromising", Austen added, "It's about the lives of these people and it doesn't try to pretend that they would try to do anything different than the way they would. They're all human beings with flaws, some more than others, and the show doesn't shy away from that."

== Episodes ==
Season	Episodes	Originally released	
Season	Episodes	First released	Last released
1	10	March 15, 2015	May 17, 2015
2	10	November 15, 2015	January 17, 2016
3	10	December 4, 2016	February 19, 2017
4	10	March 11, 2018	May 13, 2018

== Promotion ==
In January 2015, Collins commented on the public anticipation for The Royals, saying "I know there's been a lot of excitement about it in the British press." Hurley suggested that fans of Dynasty and Gossip Girl would enjoy the series.

In March 2015, a viral video of a naked man climbing out a window of Buckingham Palace on a bedsheet during the changing of the Queen's Guard, presumed to be a hoax, was publicized internationally by a variety of media outlets. The video turned out to be a publicity stunt to promote The Royals via the show's own fictional tabloid, D-Throned.

== Reception ==
Initial reviews were mixed to unfavorable. Jane Mulkerrins of The Telegraph described The Royals as "a sexy and soapy portrayal of palace life", but noted that it "lacks the sophistication" of Gossip Girl and "the compelling melodrama" of The O.C. Alessandra Stanley of The New York Times called the show "a mischievous sendup" and Hurley "amusing", but said overall that the series "gets old, and dull, very quickly." Nancy Dewolf Smith of The Wall Street Journal described The Royals as "a trashy soap opera that's not bad enough to be funny and is best when it wallows in melodrama", and David Wiegand of the San Francisco Chronicle called the show "entertaining but disappointingly toothless". The Sydney Morning Herald described the series as "possibly the worst show in the history of TV", criticizing it as "a bunch of bed-hopping halfwits saddled with ... very, very lousy dialogue". The Independent agreed, calling The Royals "probably" the "worst series ever made". Vicki Hyman of NJ.com said the show was "a royal failure," describing it as "crass and, for long stretches, tedious." The Hollywood Reporter described The Royals as being "like an extended MTV music video interspersed with dialogue" and called it "interminably boring". The Los Angeles Times panned the series, declaring that "camp requires courage, and The Royals has none", while Margaret Lyons of Vulture said the show was "flaccid, weirdly paced, and badly cast." Variety called The Royals "bloody bad", and the Chicago Reader advised viewers to "think of the worst hour-long prime-time soap operas to have assaulted our senses over the past 30 or so years, then go ahead and add this one to your brain's trash heap."

Conversely, David Hinckley of the New York Daily News wrote that The Royals "doesn't pretend to be much more than good fun, and it delivers that." Diane Gordon of TheWrap described the show as "addictive, naughty and just the right amount of silly ... it left me wanting more". Calling it "an escapist fantasy", Amanda Michelle Steiner of People wrote that "The Royals is everything that's been missing from your life since Gossip Girl and The O.C.." Ellen Gray of Philly.com also called it "silly but potentially addictive". Kevin Fallon of The Daily Beast added that "once you commit yourself to the trashy abandon of The Royals, the one critique of the show might be that the abandon isn't reckless or campy enough". Jeff Jensen of Entertainment Weekly agreed, noting that the show "actually isn't bad ... if anything, you'll wish The Royals were trashier".

The performances have generally received praise. Jensen called the acting "uniformly good", and Fallon deemed Hurley "fantastic in this role". Wiegand added, "The unquestionable highlight of the series is the mother-and-daughter reunion between Queen Helena [Hurley] and the Grand Duchess of Oxford [Joan Collins]". Dewolf Smith singled out Park's Eleanor as "the best and worst of what The Royals has to offer" and noted that Hatty Preston and Lydia Rose Bewley "steal their scenes in an Absolutely Fabulous sort of way". Steiner concurred, writing "[Preston and Bewley's] banter is possibly the best part of the premiere."

=== U.S. ratings ===
No.	Episode	Air date	Time slot (EST)	Rating/Share (18–49)	Viewers (m)
1	"Stand and Unfold Yourself"	March 15, 2015	Sunday; 10:00 p.m.	0.50	1.412
2	"Infants of the Spring"	March 22, 2015	Sunday; 10:00 p.m.	0.60	1.321
3	"We Are Pictures, or Mere Beasts"	March 29, 2015	Sunday; 10:00 p.m.	0.333	0.825
4	"Sweet, Not Lasting"	April 5, 2015	Sunday; 10:00 p.m.	0.51	1.119
5	"Unmask Her Beauty to the Moon"	April 12, 2015	Sunday; 10:00 p.m.	0.46	1.070
6	"The Slings and Arrows of Outrageous Fortune"	April 19, 2015	Sunday; 10:00 p.m.	0.45	1.123
7	"Your Sovereignty of Reason"	April 26, 2015	Sunday; 10:00 p.m.	0.52	1.125
8	"The Great Man Down"	May 3, 2015	Sunday; 10:00 p.m.	0.55	1.185
9	"In My Heart There Was a Kind of Fighting"	May 10, 2015	Sunday; 10:00 p.m.	0.56	1.172
10	"Our Wills and Fates Do So Contrary Run"	May 17, 2015	Sunday; 10:00 p.m.	0.53	1.148
11	"It Is Not, nor It Cannot Come to Good"	November 15, 2015	Sunday; 10:00 p.m.	0.41	0.841
12	"Welcome Is Fashion and Ceremony"	November 22, 2015	Sunday; 10:00 p.m.	0.40	0.725
13	"Is Not This Something More Than Fantasy?"	November 29, 2015	Sunday; 10:00 p.m.	0.24	0.532
14	"What, Has This Thing Appear'd Again Tonight?"	December 6, 2015	Sunday; 10:00 p.m.	0.31	0.627
15	"The Spirit That I Have Seen"	December 13, 2015	Sunday; 10:00 p.m.	0.28	0.653
16	"Doubt Truth to Be a Liar"	December 20, 2015	Sunday; 10:00 p.m.	0.30	0.705
17	"Taint Not Thy Mind, nor Let Thy Soul Contrive Against Thy Mother"	December 27, 2015	Sunday; 10:00 p.m.	0.26	0.671
18	"Be All My Sins Remembered"	January 3, 2016	Sunday; 10:00 p.m.	0.37	0.824
19	"And Then It Started Like a Guilty Thing"	January 10, 2016	Sunday; 10:00 p.m.	0.38	0.814
20	"The Serpent That Did Sting Thy Father's Life"	January 17, 2016	Sunday; 10:00 p.m.	0.40	0.848
21	"Together With Remembrance of Ourselves"	December 4, 2016	Sunday; 10:00 p.m.	0.26	0.609
22	"Passing Through Nature to Eternity"	December 11, 2016	Sunday; 10:00 p.m.	0.31	0.679
23	"Aye, There's the Rub"	December 18, 2016	Sunday; 10:00 p.m.	0.21	0.532
24	"Our (Late) Dear Brother's Death"	January 1, 2017	Sunday; 10:00 p.m.	0.20	0.458
25	"Born to Set it Right"	January 8, 2017	Sunday; 10:00 p.m.	0.26	0.535
26	"More Than Kin, and Less Than Kind"	January 15, 2017	Sunday; 10:00 p.m.	0.21	0.464
27	"The Counterfeit Presentment of Two Brothers"	January 22, 2017	Sunday; 10:00 p.m.	0.23	0.565
28	"In the Same Figure, Like the King That's Dead"	January 29, 2017	Sunday; 10:00 p.m.	0.20	0.502
29	"O, Farewell, Honest Soldier"	February 12, 2017	Sunday; 10:00 p.m.	0.17	0.466
30	"To Show My Duty in Your Coronation"	February 19, 2017	Sunday; 10:00 p.m.	0.20	0.520

== Broadcast, home video, and streaming ==
The Royals airs on E! in the United States and Canada. It also aired on E! in the United Kingdom and Ireland, although the channel dropped the series after season two. In Germany the series is shown on Pro Sieben. Amazon.com acquired exclusive subscription streaming rights to The Royals in October 2015, making the first season of the show available to stream for Amazon Prime subscribers. The first season is also available on the E Now mobile app (for cable subscribers), as well as the Canadian OTT video service CraveTV. Outside of the SVOD and cable subscription space, the show is available from electronic sell-through platforms such as iTunes, Amazon Instant Video and Vudu.

=== DVD release ===
Name	Release dates			Ep #	Additional information
Name	Region 1	Region 2	Region 4	Ep #	Additional information
The Complete First Season	August 18, 2015	July 27, 2015		10	English/Spanish subtitles
The Complete Second Season	March 22, 2016	April 18, 2016		10	English/Spanish subtitles, Region 1 contains digital copies of episodes
