= Theresa Donovan =

- Days of Our Lives character
- Emily O'Brien as Theresa Donovan
- Portrayed by: Hannah Taylor Simmons (1990–1991); Emily and Alicia Pillatzke (1991–1992); Caitlin Wachs (1992); Gabriella Massari (1992); Uncredited (1996–1997); Jen Lilley (2013–2023); Emily O'Brien (2023–2025)
- Duration: 1990–1992; 1996–1997; 2013–2016; 2018; 2023–2025
- First appearance: September 3, 1990
- Last appearance: March 19, 2025
- Created by: Richard J. Allen and Anne Schoettle
- Introduced by: Ken Corday and Al Rabin (1990); Ken Corday, Lisa de Cazotte and Greg Meng (2013); Ken Corday, Albert Alarr and Greg Meng (2018); Ken Corday and Albert Alarr (2023)
- Jen Lilley as Theresa Donovan
In-universe information
- Other names: Jeannie Caroline Donovan; Jeannie Theresa Donovan; Abigail Deveraux
- Occupation: Undercover operative (2016–2018); Businesswoman (2015–2016); Fashion designer (2015–2016); Personal assistant (2013–2015)
- Family: Brady
- Parents: Shane Donovan; Kimberly Brady
- Brothers: Andrew Donovan
- Half-sisters: Eve Donovan
- Spouse: Brady Black (2014); Alex Kiriakis (2024)
- Children: Tate Black
- Grandparents: Andrew Donovan II; Margaret Donovan; Shawn Brady; Caroline Brady
- Uncles: Drew Donovan; Roman Brady; Bo Brady; Frankie Brady (adoptive); Max Brady (adoptive)
- Aunts: Kayla Brady
- Nieces: Paige Larson
- First cousins: Carrie Brady Reed; Sami Brady; Eric Brady; Rex Brady; Cassie Brady; Stephanie Johnson; Joey Johnson; Shawn-Douglas Brady; Chelsea Brady; Zack Brady; Ciara Brady

Theresa Donovan (introduced as Jeannie Donovan) is a fictional character from Days of Our Lives, an American soap opera on the NBC network. Introduced in September 1990, she was portrayed by several child actors until the character left the series in 1992, with further guest appearances in both 1996 and 1997. The character was reintroduced to the series in July 2013, under the portrayal of actress Jen Lilley, best known for her portrayal of Maxie Jones on General Hospital, and departed in November 2016. Lilley reprised the role in May 2018 for a three-month stint, departing again in July. Lilley briefly returned to the role in September 2023, with Emily O'Brien assuming the role in the following month.

Theresa is the daughter of supercouple Shane Donovan and Kimberly Brady (Charles Shaughnessy and, most prominently, Patsy Pease). With the casting of Lilley in the role, the character entered her first major story line, opposite Casey Moss who portrays JJ Deveraux.

== Casting ==
In April 2013, it was announced by Soap Opera Digest and several other sources that Jen Lilley joined the cast of Days of Our Lives in a newly created role with ties to the canvas. Due to the show's advanced filming schedule, Lilley began filming in the (then-unknown) role in March 2013. Lilley made her on-screen debut as Theresa on July 3, 2013.

In May 2016, Daytime Confidential reported that Lilley had quit the soap after three years. Lilley made her final appearance on November 18, 2016. On November 17, 2017, it was announced that Lilley would reprise the role of Theresa; she returned on May 3, 2018. Lilley once again exited the role on July 19, 2018.

On August 14, 2023, it was announced Lilley would return to the role in honor of the character of Victor Kiriakis following the passing of John Aniston earlier that year, Lilley returned on September 1, 2023. Weeks later, it was announced Lilley's return would be brief and the role would be recast; Lilley last appeared on September 22.

On October 2, 2023, it was announced Emily O'Brien, who joined the cast in 2020 as Gwen Rizczech, would assume the role of Theresa; she first appeared in the final moments of the October 6 episode; she exited the role when Theresa left in July 2024. In November 2024, it was announced O'Brien would reprise the role; Theresa returned in March 2025.

== Character development ==
Lilley, on creating a role of her own (2013)

"Ugh, it's such a blessing. I feel like I'm finally part of something. On General Hospital, I had two bleeding ulcers because I was so stressed out. I never knew what was going to happen, day in and day out. I can finally relax a bit."

— Deanna Barnert, MSN

With the casting of Lilley, executive producer Ken Corday admits that seeing the actress' work on General Hospital helped with the casting of the actress in the role of Theresa. Upon Theresa's re-appearance on the canvas, she was characterized as the "bad girl". In an interview with MSN Entertainment on her role, Lilley spoke: "Part of me doesn't want to make excuses for her, because you can have horrible upbringing and make something positive of it. Some of the most amazing, well-grounded people have come from the wrong side of the tracks. Obviously, the Brady-Donovan family is a great family, but her dad Shane is a spy and I watched the episode where he leaves the kids with Kimberly. Theresa was probably one, at most, so she didn't have a dad growing up, which is a formula for trouble. Typical psychological path for a girl like that is to look for love in the wrong places and look for a father figure in older guys." The role of Theresa has been described as "sarcastic, calculating, mischievous" and "mysterious". Lilley also called her "such a badass".

For her casting, Lilley stated she originally went in for two roles, those of both Theresa and Jordan Ridgeway. At the time, she was hoping to book the "good girl" role; however for her second audition, was asked to amp it up to a more bad girl persona and concentrate on Theresa. She revealed: "I got to skip the first audition, which is called a pre-read and is an audition to audition. So then I auditioned with everyone else, and I got to do my screen test twice, which is very unusual. I was the only girl who got to do that, so I went first and last. The reason they had me do it twice is that I wore my hair curly, and I have a really young face, and they said that I looked too sweet and innocent and young with the curly hair. So they straightened my hair and had me do it again. On the second take, I knew that I had nothing to lose. I had already done a perfect first take, and they told me it wasn't going to get better than that so I could do whatever I wanted. I just did everything out of the box, and that's what got me the job. I mean I took the guy's shirt off in the scene! I told the actor that this is a character with no concept of personal space, so I asked him if it's ok if I touch him. He said that was fine and it was my screen test. So I took his shirt off and I threw some props at him at the end. I broke all the rules, and I think [the casting staff] thought, that is that character."

== Storylines ==
Jeannie Theresa Donovan is introduced in September 1990, to Kimberly Brady (Patsy Pease), and was originally believed to be the daughter of Cal Winter. (Note: During Cal's duration with the series, he was portrayed by two actors: Wortham Krimmer (1989–90) and Joseph Bottoms (1991).) However, paternity tests and a confession from Cal proved her father to be Shane Donovan (Charles Shaughnessy). She grew up with her parents in Salem, before relocating to Los Angeles.

In July 2013, Jeannie returns to Salem, this time going by her middle name, Theresa. Initially, she strikes up a connection with resident bad boy JJ Deveraux (Casey Moss) while trying to secure some pot. During a confrontation with JJ and his mother Jennifer Horton (Melissa Reeves) in her office, her aunt Kayla confirms that Theresa is in fact Jeannie and that Jen promised to hire her as her assistant, a promise she reluctantly agrees to. Kayla reminds Theresa it is her last chance at a fresh start. Theresa also strikes up a bad first impression with Jennifer's daughter Abigail Deveraux (Kate Mansi) when Abigail smells pot on Theresa in her mother's office. To continue to battle against Jennifer, she teams up with Anne Milbauer (Meredith Scott Lynn) in hopes of exacting her perfect revenge. In a ploy, Theresa reveals her intentions to hopefully woo Dr. Daniel Jonas (Shawn Christian). After sleeping with JJ, Theresa overdoses on marijuana and GHB. Upon hearing of their daughter's overdose and continuing problems, Shane and Kimberly return to town in the hopes of handling their daughter's problem, together. After believing that Theresa has a handle on her addictions, Shane and Kimberly leave town together. Theresa then teams up with hospital co-worker Anne Milbauer (Meredith Scott Lynn) to conspire against Jennifer, using Daniel as a way to hurt their relationship. In early 2014, following a Narcotics Anonymous (NA) meeting, she begins a sexual and drugged-fused relationship with Brady Black (Eric Martsolf). In 2015, after it is found that Kristen DiMera (Eileen Davidson) stole Theresa's embryo and carried it to term, Brady and Melanie Jonas return her son, Christopher, to her and Brady, and the pair rename him Tate. When Theresa moves into the Kiriakis mansion, tensions arise between her and Victor. She eventually expresses her interest in purchasing Basic Black and running it as her own fashion company, with financial backing from Maggie Horton (Suzanne Rogers). In the hopes of finding the right partner, she teams up with Kate Roberts (Lauren Koslow) and Nicole Walker (Arianne Zucker) to achieve the goal of purchasing Basic Black, with Kate and Nicole's business background and her own interest in fashion design. As she and Brady share several instances of rekindling their romance, she is kicked out of the mansion by Victor; as a result, Brady quits Titan and moves in with Theresa and Tate, in their own penthouse.

== Reception ==
Upon the news of Lilley joining the cast, Michael Fairman of On-Air On-Soaps credited her casting as, "fantastic news for [Jen Lilley] fans". Despite rumors of Lilley joining the cast as a recast for either Belle Black or Cassie Brady, it was informed she would portray a new character. Janet DiLauro of About.com praised Theresa as a "riveting character", writing: "Days of our Lives has been seriously lacking in the bad girl department [...] Enter the deliciously naughty Theresa Donovan and suddenly it seems like Salem will never be the same." Cindy McLennan from TV Series Finale called Theresa the "latest Salem vixen".
