= Sam Page =

Sam Page may refer to:

- Sam Jensen Page (born 1974), celebrity fitness coach and bodyguard in Los Angeles, California
- Sam Page (baseball) (1916–2002), Major League Baseball pitcher
- Sam Page (footballer) (born 1987), English footballer
- Sam Page (Missouri politician) (born 1965), American physician and politician
- Sam Page (North Carolina politician), North Carolina law enforcement officer and politician
- Samuel Page (born 1976), American actor credited under the name Sam Page
