= Jonathan Stoddard =

American attorney

United States Attorney for the District of Connecticut
- In office 1844–1849
- President: John Tyler; James K. Polk
- Preceded by: Charles Chapman
- Succeeded by: Thomas Clap Perkins

Personal details
- Born: October 8, 1807 Derby, Connecticut, US
- Died: August 27, 1855 (aged 47) New Haven, Connecticut, US
- Party: Democratic
- Education: Yale (1831); Yale Law School (1833)
- Profession: Lawyer

Jonathan Stoddard (October 9, 1807 – August 8, 1855) was an American attorney who served as the United States Attorney for the District of Connecticut under two presidents

== Biography ==
Jonathan Stoddard was born in Derby, Connecticut on October 9, 1807. After graduating his father's alma mater, Yale, in 1831, he began Yale Law School. Upon his graduation in 1833 he was admitted to the New Haven Bar. He was a Democrat and spent five years serving as the United States Attorney for the district of Connecticut. He died unmarried of an unknown illness in 1845.
