= Farm Kings =

2012 American reality television series

Farm Kings is a reality television show, which started in 2012 and is found on the Great American Country channel. In the UK it airs on Food Network UK. The basis of the show is about the King family which consists of a divorced single mother and her nine boys and one girl, who have a passion for growing and buying local produce and meat. The King family now owns 200 acres of farm land outside of Butler, Pennsylvania. Their farm, Freedom Farms, raises chickens, cows and pigs. They are all pasture raised and free of antibiotics and hormones. They grow over 25 varieties of fruits and vegetables.

== Family Dynamics ==
- Lisa King (Divorced Mom): Mother of 10 children, she grows and sells fresh cut flowers for the family business and for weddings, Family calls her "Mama Bear Lisa"
- Joe King: Oldest of the 10 children, CEO of Freedom Farms, Makes all the decisions always looking for new ways to improve and expand the farm & graduated from Penn State as a Civil Engineer
- Elizabeth “Bitty” King is the only girl, helps her mom Lisa out at the family Bakery, took a year off and moved away from the farm to get away from the stressful family business and moved back to be a part of Freedom Farms as she is very close to her family
- Tim King is in charge of planting and tending to all of the crops, is referred to as the “Plant Doctor”, and is very stubborn, persevering and very strong willed
- Pete King is known as the “Human Harvester”, does everything from tending to the chickens, is a field hand and does sales and is very outgoing
- Dan King is referred to as the “Utility Man”. He is in charge of the farmer’s markets and helps out his brothers when they need an extra hand on a job
- Luke King is the “Brains of the Family”, is one of the family members to go to college. He completed medical school and is now a resident physician.
- Sam King likes to think that he is the “Big Man on Campus”, is determined to succeed, and is starting to take on more responsibility when it comes to harvesting the crops
- John King is the “Joker” of the family, lightens the mood when there is tension within the family, is not a complainer and will do whatever his brothers tell him to do
- Paul King is very helpful and up for any challenge, is 100% committed to farming
- Ben King is the youngest, has Down syndrome, works alongside his brothers, and “No one treats him differently because he has special needs”

The family is constantly growing and changing but still manages to live by this one simple quote. “It’s not easy working with family because you expect too much. Everyone has their faults, so it’s about having to deal”
