= Great American Pure Flix =

American Christian media service

- Company type: Joint venture
- Website type: OTT streaming platform
- Available in: English (American); Spanish (American)
- Headquarters: Scottsdale, Arizona, U.S.
- Country of origin: United States
- Area served: Worldwide
- Owners: Great American Media; Sony Pictures
- Website: pureflix.com
- Commercial: Yes
- Registration: Required
- Users: ▲1 million (As of December 2020)
- Launched: 2015; 11 years ago
- Current status: Active

Great American Pure Flix, formerly Pure Flix and sometimes stylized as Pureflix, is an American Christian media subscription over-the-top streaming service owned by Great American Media and Sony Pictures.

== History ==
The service was first established in 2015 by the Christian film studio Pure Flix Entertainment, after it acquired the video on demand provider I Am Flix; the company stated that it would offer over 2,000 films and series at launch.

In November 2020, Sony Pictures announced its acquisition of the Pure Flix service, bringing it under its own faith-based film studio Affirm Films; as the sale included the rights to the "Pure Flix" trademark, Pure Flix Entertainment was subsequently renamed to Pinnacle Peak Pictures in January 2021.

In May 2023, Sony announced that Pure Flix would become a joint venture with Great American Media, a company led by former Hallmark Channel CEO Bill Abbott; terms of the agreement were not disclosed, besides that Great American Media would hold a controlling stake in the venture, and that Abbott would serve as CEO following the completion of the transaction. In September 2023, Pure Flix rebranded as Great American Pure Flix.

Mario Lopez announced on February 6, 2024, that he had signed a multi-film deal with Great American Family, Great American Faith & Living, and for streaming on Great American Pure Flix.

In September 2025, the service became available on the YouTube Primetime Channels store as part of Great American Media's carriage agreement with YouTube TV.

The company is a strategic partner of the International Coalition of Apostolic Leaders, a New Apostolic Reformation apostolic organization.

== Programming ==
It is known for its distribution of Sony's Affirm Films and Pinnacle Peak Pictures, such as the God's Not Dead series, Miracles from Heaven, War Room, and The Star. It also streams original content by Great American Family and Great American Living.

The service also syndicates content from Angel Studios, Christian Broadcasting Network, NBCUniversal, and others, such as Bonanza, The Chosen, the original Superbook, the new Superbook, Madeline, and VeggieTales. They also license individual films, such as the Duck Commander film The Blind.
