= Great American Media =

Texan media company

GAC Media, LLC
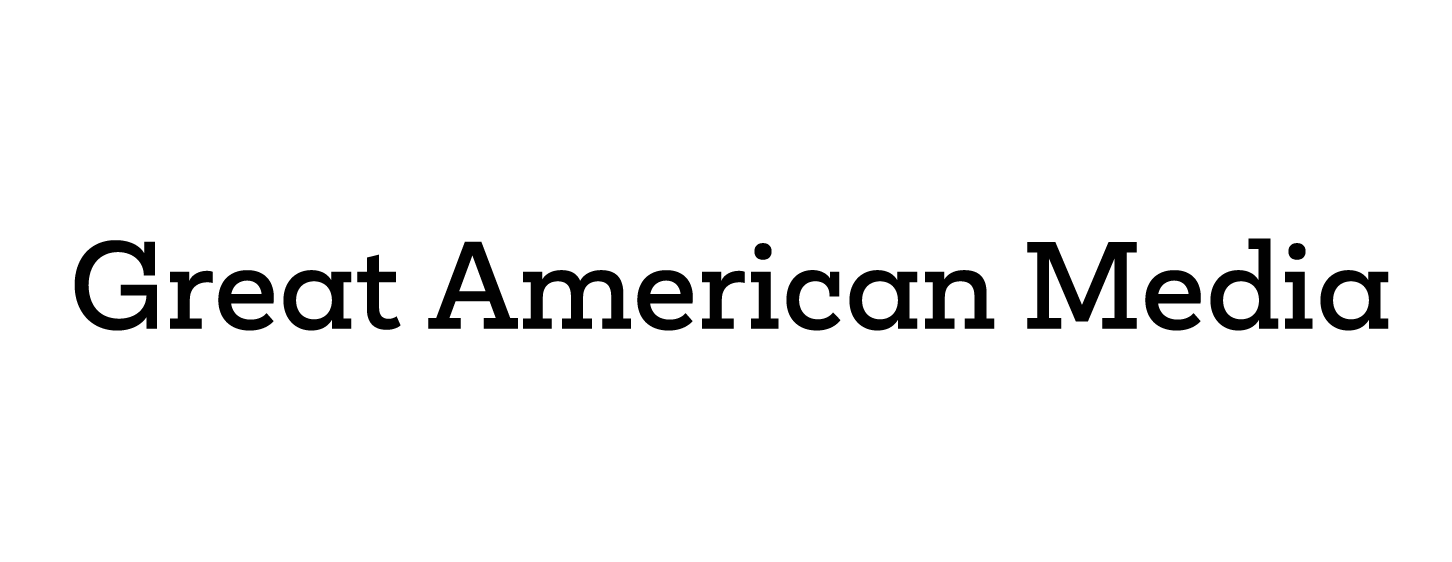
- Trade name: Great American Media
- Type: Private
- Industry: Broadcasting
- Founded: June 7, 2021; 5 years ago
- Founders: Bill Abbott; Tom Hicks
- Headquarters: Arlington, Texas, U.S.
- Key people: Bill Abbott (CEO); Candace Cameron Bure (CCO)
- Owner: Hicks Equity Partners
- Website: gacmedia.com

GAC Media, LLC, doing business as Great American Media, is an Arlington, Texas-based media company. It is the owner of the U.S. cable networks Great American Family and Great American Faith & Living, and streaming service Great American Pure Flix with Sony Pictures.

== History ==
The company was announced on June 7, 2021, through its acquisition of the cable networks Great American Country and Ride TV from Discovery, Inc. and Ride Television Network, Inc. respectively. The company is led by private equity investor Tom Hicks, and Bill Abbott—who formerly served as CEO of Crown Media Holdings. After taking over the channels, they were rebranded as the "Great American Channels", with GAC itself being relaunched as GAC Family and taking on a family-friendly entertainment format not unlike Abbott's former employer Hallmark Channel, and Ride TV becoming GAC Living.

GAC Family would emulate many of Abbott's programming decisions at Hallmark Channel, including a focus on original television films and holiday-themed content. It also signed deals with various actors associated with Hallmark Channel productions. In April 2022, GAC Media hired Candace Cameron Bure–who had worked with Hallmark Channel since 2008–in an executive role, which would see her develop and star in original productions for its networks. During its upfronts, Abbott stated that the company planned to expand into over-the-top content ventures, with plans for a lifestyle-based free ad-supported streaming television (FAST) channel known as Great American Adventures, and a "fan portal".

In May 2022, GAC Media announced Great American Community, a planned service launching in September that would carry short-form programming featuring GAC talent and personalities, and feature online forums allowing users to interact with them. The service would be free and ad-supported, but GAC Media did not rule out a premium tier in the future.

In July 2022, GAC Media launched Great American Adventures on Xumo, which carries lifestyle and entertainment programming oriented towards "Americana". Later that month, GAC Media announced that it would change its trade name to Great American Media, as part of a corporate rebranding that also saw GAC Family and Living renamed Great American Family and Great American Living respectively on August 20, 2022. GAC Media will remain the company's legal name.

In May 2023, Pure Flix —a Sony Pictures-owned streaming service for faith-based content—announced that it would merge with Great American Media. Terms of the proposed merger were not disclosed, but GAC Media would hold a controlling stake in the new entity, with Abbott as CEO. In February 2024, the company signed a multi-film deal with actor Mario Lopez.

In 2024, the company re-located its headquarters from Fort Worth to Arlington.

== Assets ==
=== Linear networks ===
- Great American Family
- Great American Faith & Living

=== Over-the-top services ===
- Great American Adventures
- Great American Community
- Great American Pure Flix (joint venture with Sony Pictures' Affirm Films)
