= Great American Family =

American digital cable and satellite television network

- Country: United States
- Broadcast area: Nationwide
- Headquarters: Arlington, Texas

Programming
- Language: English
- Picture format: HDTV 1080i; Downgraded to letterboxed SDTV feed

Ownership
- Owner: Great American Media
- Sister channels: Great American Faith & Living

History
- Launched: December 31, 1995; 30 years ago
- Former names: Great American Country (1995–2021); GAC (1995–2013; secondary branding throughout run of network); GAC Family (2021–22)

Links
- Website: www.gacfamily.com

Availability

Streaming media
- Service(s): DirecTV Stream, Frndly TV, FuboTV, Hulu with Live TV, Philo, Sling TV, Vidgo TV, YouTube TV

Great American Family is an American cable television network owned by Great American Media. The channel broadcasts family-oriented general entertainment programming such as television series and made-for-TV movies, some of which contain faith-based themes.

It was originally established in 1995 by Jones Radio Network as Great American Country (GAC), a country music channel. GAC was later acquired by Scripps Networks and, in turn, Discovery Inc.; under Scripps, GAC was relaunched to focus primarily upon lifestyle programming pertaining to the American Heartland and the South, with country-music programming gradually being phased out.

On June 28, 2021, the channel was acquired by GAC Media—a new ownership group that includes former Crown Media CEO Bill Abbott, and Hicks Equity Partners. On September 27, 2021, the network was relaunched as GAC Family (later Great American Family); its format mirrors the programming strategies Abbott had developed while at Hallmark Channel, including a focus on original movies and specials tied to holidays. Its productions also leverage talent previously associated with Hallmark Channel, such as Candace Cameron Bure (who was also named chief content officer). The previous country lifestyle format was moved to Ride TV—a second channel acquired by GAC Media–which was concurrently relaunched as the sister network GAC Living (later Great American Faith & Living).

As of February 2015, GAC was available to approximately 59 million television households (51% of pay television customers) in the United States.

== History ==
=== As Great American Country ===
First Great American Country logo, used from launch to 2004

Great American Country logo (2014–2021)

The channel was launched on December 31, 1995, with the first music video to be broadcast on the channel, Garth Brooks' "The Thunder Rolls". The channel was originally owned by the Centennial, Colorado-based Jones Radio Network.

On October 12, 2004, the first incarnation of Scripps Networks (then a division of the Cincinnati, Ohio-based E.W. Scripps Company) announced that it would acquire Great American Country from Jones Radio Network for $140 million, the acquisition was eventually completed on November 17, 2004.

In late 2005, television industry trade publication Broadcasting & Cable named GAC as one of TV's "Breakout Networks", saying of the channel: "The emerging GAC is a younger, hipper version [of CMT] that respects Nashville's country roads but widens the boulevards."

In December 2007, the network announced a partnership with ABC Radio Networks (now Cumulus Media Networks) to produce GAC Nights: Live from Nashville, a syndicated country music radio show broadcast from GAC's Music Row studios and hosted by GAC personalities Suzanne Alexander, Storme Warren, and Nan Kelley.

In July 2008, Scripps Networks was spun off from the E. W. Scripps Company as Scripps Networks Interactive.

On October 1, 2013, the network unveiled a new logo inspired by the U.S. flag, dropping the "GAC" acronym, while also going back to using the original "Great American Country" name in full. The network stated that it wanted to emphasize its expansion from a country music-oriented channel to one with a larger emphasis on "country" as referring to a "sense of place" and lifestyles (citing programming such as Celebrity Motor Homes and Farm Kings as examples). With the channel's rebranding, the daily music video show Daily Countdown was renamed Great American Playlist. Top 20 Country Countdown continued to air (it was cancelled in December 2018), and the network still offered country music specials including Backstory, Introducing and Origins.

In March 2018, Discovery Inc. acquired Scripps Networks Interactive.

=== As GAC Family/Great American Family ===
GAC Family logo, used from September 2021 to August 2022.

On June 7, 2021, GAC Media, a Arlington-based investment group led by private equity investor Tom Hicks and former Crown Media Holdings CEO Bill Abbott announced that it would acquire Great American Country from Discovery Inc.; the company had recently announced its intent to merge with WarnerMedia. GAC Media would also acquire the equestrian network Ride TV. Abbott had abruptly stepped down from Crown Media in January 2020, shortly after Hallmark Channel was criticized for pulling commercials from the wedding registry Zola that included a lesbian couple.

In August 2021, GAC Media announced that it would relaunch Great American Country as GAC Family on September 27, with the GAC initials re-backronymed to stand for "Great American Channels". The channel was repositioned as a family-oriented general entertainment network with similarities to Hallmark Channel, which Abbot had previously overseen as Crown Media CEO. The previous country lifestyle format was transferred over to Ride TV, which concurrently rebranded as the sister channel GAC Living.

GAC Family would mirror many of the programming strategies that Abbott developed while overseeing Hallmark Channel, including original made-for-TV movies and holiday programming. The network has signed deals with a number of actors that have been associated with Hallmark Channel productions, including Trevor Donovan, Jen Lilley, Jessica Lowndes, Jesse Metcalfe, Danica McKellar, and Cameron Mathison, to appear in GAC Family original movies. On April 19, 2022, it was announced that GAC Media had hired Candace Cameron Bure—who had a long-standing relationship with Hallmark Channel dating back to 2008—as its chief content officer, and that she would develop, produce and star in original romantic comedies and holiday content for its networks.

During GAC Media's first upfronts presentation in April 2022, Abbott told Broadcasting & Cable that the quick transition to GAC Family did not give them enough time to promote the channel to advertisers—many of whom had already made their advertising commitments for the fourth quarter—leaving it unable to fully capitalize from the Christmas holiday season in 2021. However, Abbott felt that the market would be "pretty strong" in 2022, and believed that the network was "certainly selling family-friendly content and quality original movies with talent that people love and resonate with viewers". The network slated 18 new original movie premieres for Great American Christmas in 2022. He also revealed plans for new digital platforms, including a free ad-supported streaming service known as "Great American Adventure", and a "fan portal" that would allow users to interact with GAC talent.

In July 2022, GAC Media announced a corporate rebranding that would replace the "GAC" prefix with "Great American", with GAC Family being rebranded as Great American Family on August 20, 2022, and GAC Media changing its trade name to Great American Media.

On February 6, 2024, Mario Lopez announced a multi-year deal with Great American Media to appear in productions across its properties, with Lopez expected to be involved in Great American Family's slate of Christmas movies for 2024.

== Programming ==
Great American Family is positioned as a family-oriented channel with original series and movies reflecting "American culture, lifestyle and heritage", and emphasizing "relationships and the emotional connections related to holidays, seasons and occasions". Abbott stated that the network planned to feature "soft faith" and secular programming, describing the market for faith-based programming as being "grossly underserved". He explained that the network aimed to focus on character development and avoid themes that were too "on the nose", stating that "it takes 10 quality projects to outdo the one bad one that people see that reinforces the notion that faith-based content is either cheesy or bad quality."

The network acquired season 2 of When Hope Calls, a spin-off of Hallmark Channel's When Calls the Heart that originally aired on the network's streaming service Hallmark Movies Now. In February 2022, it acquired reruns of the Full House sequel series Fuller House, which was originally produced for Netflix.

Under its previous ownership, original programming included series such as Kimberly's Simply Southern, a cooking show featuring Kimberly Schlapman of the country group Little Big Town; Farm Kings, a reality show chronicling the King family of Freedom Farms; and Celebrity Motorhomes. From 2011 through 2013, GAC broadcast the National Finals Rodeo.

=== Special programming ===
Following the cancellation of Hallmark Channel's annual Kitten Bowl special (a feline-centric parallel to Animal Planet's annual Puppy Bowl special, which airs on the day of the Super Bowl), the network announced that it would present a similar event known as the Great American Rescue Bowl in 2023, with host Beth Stern moving over to the new program.

In July 2023, it was announced that Great American Family would broadcast the Tournament of Roses Parade beginning in 2024 under a multi-year deal, replacing Hallmark Channel as its "official" cable broadcaster (notwithstanding the event also being carried on cable by Cowboy Channel).

=== Content standards ===
In a November 2022 interview with The Wall Street Journal, chief creative officer Candace Cameron Bure stated her desire to produce movies with stronger faith-based themes for Great American Family, explaining that GAC "wanted to promote faith programming and good family entertainment". She stated, "I think that Great American Family will keep traditional marriage at the core." Of Bure's implication that Great American Media productions would never depict same-sex couples, Abbott responded, "It's certainly the year 2022, so we're aware of the trends. There's no whiteboard that says, 'Yes, this' or 'No, we'll never go here.'"

Bure's remarks faced criticism from members and supporters of the LGBT community, as they were believed to be an allusion to the increasing use of progressive themes—such as recognition of LGBT relationships—in Hallmark Channel productions. In response to the criticism, Bure stated that people of various "identities" worked on Great American Media programming, and that "all of you who know me, know beyond question that I have great love and affection for all people." In December 2022, actor Neal Bledsoe announced via social media that he would end his relationship with GAC Media, stating that "the thought that my work could be used to deliberately discriminate against anyone horrifies and infuriates me", and that "I could never forgive myself for continuing my relationship with a network that actively chooses to exclude the LGBTQIA+ community". In October 2023, Abbott distanced himself from Bure's statements, stating that they were not on behalf of Great American Media.

== Carriage ==
On November 5, 2010, AT&T U-verse dropped all Scripps Networks, including GAC, due to a carriage dispute over an increase in retransmission fees. Two days later the dispute was resolved.

In October 2021, GAC Media reached an agreement with over-the-top service Frndly TV.

In November 2021, Philo and GAC Media reached a deal to add GAC Living and GAC Family to the service beginning in early December 2021.

In March 2025, FCC chairman Brendan Carr sent a letter to YouTube TV parent company Google requesting comment on its non-carriage of Great American Family, accusing the company of "deliberately [marginalizing] faith-based and family-friendly content". YouTube responded to the complaint, stating that the company "welcome[s] the opportunity to brief the FCC on YouTube TV's subscription service and the strategic business decisions we make based on factors like user demand, operational cost and financial terms, and to reiterate that we do not have any policies that prohibit religious content". YouTube TV later announced a carriage agreement with Great American Media in September 2025, adding its two channels to its lineup, and adding Great American Pure Flix to its Primetime Channels store.

In August 2025, it was announced that Great American Media would contribute content to Truth Social's streaming service Truth+.

== See also ==
- Up TV
