= Universal TV =

Pay television channel

- Country: United States
- Broadcast area: Latin America; Africa; Germany; Australia; New Zealand

Ownership
- Owner: NBCUniversal International Networks (NBCUniversal/Comcast) (operated and distributed by Ole Distribution); Brazil: NBCUniversal International Networks (50%), Canais Globo (Grupo Globo, 50%) (distributed by Canais Globo)
- Sister channels: 13th Street Universal; Diva Universal; Studio Universal; Movies 24; Bravo; DreamWorks Channel; Sky News

History
- Launched: September 1, 2004; 22 years ago (Latin America); May 29, 2008; 18 years ago (Russia); December 2009; 16 years ago (Turkey)
- Closed: May 1, 2015; 11 years ago (Russia; Romania); January 27, 2020; 6 years ago (United Kingdom)
- Replaced by: Sky Comedy (United Kingdom)

Links
- Website: Universal TV Brazil; Universal TV South Africa; Universal TV Latin America; Universal Channel Russia

Universal TV, formerly Universal Channel, is an international pay television network specializing in movies and television series in the thriller, drama, comedy, horror, crime and investigation genres, owned by NBCUniversal International Networks, a division of NBCUniversal and available on satellite and cable platforms. They were formerly branded as USA Network until 2003 when the name was changed to take more advantage of the Universal branding, but continue programming as that network does like a general interest network.

== Launched in other countries ==
The Universal Channel logo used from 2007 to 2010 (used until 2011 in Latin America, and Brazil)

Universal Channel logo used from 2013 until 2018.

=== Original launch ===
Universal Channel was officially launched on 1 September 2004 in Latin America, then it launched on 1 December 2007 in Poland (as Kanał Universal) and Romania (as Canalul Universal) and on 1 July 2008 in Southeast Asia.

=== Re-branded in selected countries ===
In South Africa, Hallmark Channel was re-branded under that name on 24 March 2010 for DStv subscribers. In Japan, Sci Fi Channel re-branded to that name on 1 April 2010. In Australia, Hallmark Channel re-branded to that name on 1 July 2010. In Hungary, Czech Republic, Slovakia and ex Yugoslav countries Serbia, Croatia and Bosnia and Herzegovina, Hallmark Channel was re-branded to that name on 3 September 2010. And in the Philippines, this channel was launched on 26 July 2010 and replaced the Sci Fi Channel which was rebranded as Universal Channel.

On 18 October 2010, the Hallmark Channel in the UK and Ireland was rebranded, adopting the Universal Channel name. The UK version closed on 27 January 2020. On 3 May 2018, starting with the UK, they have begun the global rebrand of the channel as 'Universal TV'. In August 2018, the Brazilian signal of Universal Channel was rebranded to Universal TV, with the Latin American variant following suit in October.

=== Launch in New Zealand ===
In 2021, SkyTV New Zealand and NBCUniversal had signed a multi-year deal allowing Sky to broadcast their new movies, programmes and content while also taking into effect their current catalogue. Therefore, releasing Universal TV to New Zealand audiences as a part of Sky New Zealand’s Starter pack.

=== Closure in Russia ===
On April 30, 2015, Universal Channel was closed due to financial problems in the Russian market, along with E!.

== Universal Channels around the world ==
Channel	Country or region	Formerly	Launch year	Shutdown year
Universal TV	Latin America	USA Network (first era)	September 1, 2004	
Universal Channel (Polish TV channel)	Poland		December 1, 2007	December 31, 2017
Universal Channel (Romanian TV channel)	Romania		December 1, 2007	April 30, 2015
Universal Channel (Russian TV channel)	Russia		May 29, 2008	April 30, 2015
Universal Channel (Asian TV channel)	Asia		July 1, 2008	July 1, 2017
Universal Channel (Greek TV channel)	Greece		May 7, 2009 (Note: On this reference, and other secondary sources like this one or this another one, I read Universal Channel launched in Greece on May 7, 2009, but checking out on the official website I read the channel launched on May 5, 2008.)	May 31, 2012
Universal Channel (Greek TV channel)	Cyprus		May 7, 2009	March 31, 2013
Universal Channel (Turkish TV channel)	Turkey		December 17, 2009	2013
Universal Channel (South African TV channel)	South Africa	Hallmark Channel	March 24, 2010	
Universal Channel (Japanese TV channel)	Japan	Sci Fi	April 1, 2010	March 31, 2013
Universal TV (Australian TV channel)	Australia	Hallmark Channel	July 1, 2010	
Universal Channel (Eastern European TV channel)	Czech Republic, Slovakia	Hallmark Channel	3 September 2010	July 30, 2016
Universal Channel (Eastern European TV channel)	Hungary	Hallmark Channel	3 September 2010	August 28, 2016
Universal Channel (Eastern European TV channel)	Serbia, Croatia, Slovenia	Hallmark Channel	3 September 2010	September 1, 2016 (replaced by Diva Universal)
Universal TV (British and Irish TV channel)	United Kingdom, Ireland	Hallmark Channel	18 October 2010	27 January 2020 (replaced by Sky Comedy)
Universal TV (German TV channel)	Germany, Switzerland		September 5, 2013	
Universal TV (New Zealand)	New Zealand		April 30, 2021	
Universal TV (Franch TV channel)	France		September 12, 2027	

== Programmes ==
=== Latin America ===
- Almost Paradise
- Bates Motel
- Blue Bloods
- Beauty & the Beast
- Brothers & Sisters
- The Cape
- Chicago Fire
- Chicago Med
- Chicago P.D.
- Dalziel & Pascoe
- Elementary
- The Event
- Family Law
- FBI
- FBI: International
- FBI: Most Wanted
- The Good Wife
- Grimm
- House
- Law & Order
- Law & Order: LA
- Law & Order: Special Victims Unit
- The Librarians
- Magnum P.I.
- Psych
- The Rookie
- Rookie Blue
- Stalker
- Surviving Suburbia
- Walker, Texas Ranger
- Worst Week

=== Czech Republic, Slovakia, Hungary, Serbia, Croatia, Bosnia and Slovenia ===
- Being Erica
- Blue Bloods
- Brothers & Sisters
- Clara Sheller
- Diagnosis: Murder
- ER
- Foyle's War
- Fact or Faked: Paranormal Files
- Fairly Legal
- Foyle's War
- The Good Wife
- The Guardian
- Haven
- Hawaii Five-0
- Judging Amy
- Law & Order
- Law & Order: Special Victims Unit
- Law & Order: Criminal Intent
- Life Is Wild
- McLeod's Daughters
- Medium
- Midsomer Murders
- Miss Marple
- Monk
- Nash Bridges
- Psych
- The Real Housewives of New York City
- The Real Housewives of Orange County
- Rookie Blue
- Royal Pains
- Salem's Lot
- Scandal
- Sea Patrol
- The Sentinel
- Shattered
- Three Rivers
- Who Do You Think You Are?

=== South Africa ===
- Being Erica
- Bones
- Bosch
- Chicago Med
- Chicago P.D.
- Cold Case
- CSI: Crime Scene Investigation
- CSI: Cyber
- CSI:NY
- Dark Matter
- The Detail
- Flashpoint
- House
- Law & Order
- Law & Order: Criminal Intent
- Law & Order: Special Victims Unit
- The Librarians
- Men in Trees
- The Mentalist
- Monk
- NCIS
- NCIS: New Orleans
- Numb3rs
- Psych
- Ransom
- Rizzoli & Isles
- Rookie Blue
- Second Chance
- Taxi Brooklyn
- Two and a Half Men
- Unforgettable
- Wild at Heart

=== United Kingdom ===
- Acceptable Risk
- Bates Motel
- Burden of Truth
- Chance
- Chicago Justice
- Chicago Med
- CSI: Miami
- CSI: NY
- Condor
- Coroner
- Departure
- The Disappearance
- Gone
- How to Get Away with Murder
- Law & Order: Special Victims Unit
- Major Crimes
- Motive
- Mr. Robot
- The Murders
- NCIS
- Private Eyes
- Proven Innocent
- Pure Genius
- Ransom
- The Resident
- Rookie Blue
- Royal Pains
- Second Chance
- Sleepy Hollow

== See also ==
- Universal TV (UK and Ireland)
- Universal Channel (Asia)
- Universal TV (Australia)
- Universal Channel (Greece)
- Universal Channel (Japan)
- Universal TV (New Zealand)
- Universal TV (Turkey)
