= Universal TV (United Kingdom and Ireland) =

British TV channel (1999–2020)

- Country: United Kingdom; Ireland
- Broadcast area: United Kingdom, Ireland

Programming
- Picture format: 1080i HDTV (downscaled to 16:9 576i for the SDTV feed)
- Timeshift service: Universal TV +1

Ownership
- Owner: NBCUniversal International Networks (NBCUniversal)
- Sister channels: CNBC Europe; E! Movies 24; Sky Sci-Fi

History
- Launched: 18 October 1999; 26 years ago
- Closed: 27 January 2020; 6 years ago
- Replaced by: Sky Comedy
- Former names: Hallmark Entertainment Network; Hallmark Channel (1999–2010); Universal Channel (2010–2018)

Links
- Website: www.universaltv.co.uk (archived, now redirects to Sky.com)

Universal TV was a British and Irish pay television channel owned by the NBCUniversal International Networks division of NBCUniversal. It was devoted primarily to imported drama series, mostly from the United States, and operated under various names between 1999 and 2020.

== History ==
=== As Hallmark Channel ===
The channel launched in October 1999 and was previously owned by the privately backed Sparrowhawk Media Group, until late 2007 when it was bought out by NBCUniversal. It previously licensed programming and branding from Crown Media Holdings, and was previously known as the Hallmark Entertainment Network and the Hallmark Channel (Crown Media had sold off their international assets in 2005).

Coinciding with the launch of Hallmark Channel HD, Hallmark Channel became 16:9 widescreen capable on 28 June 2010.

=== As Universal Channel ===
In June 2009, a memorandum leaked to the television trade newspaper Broadcast stated that NBC Universal planned to rebrand the Hallmark Channel as a Universal Channel in October 2009. The "Hallmark Channel" brand was licensed to NBC Universal from Crown Media (which operates the US Hallmark Channel) and was due to expire. An NBC Universal spokesperson denied such a rebrand would happen.

On 2 September 2010, Universal Networks International confirmed plans to rebrand the Hallmark Channel as the Universal Channel in the UK. On 18 October, the pay-TV channel and its timeshift and high definition variants became the Universal Channel, Universal Channel +1 and Universal Channel HD.

The Universal Channel gave UK premieres to cop show Rookie Blue and legal drama Fairly Legal in early 2011. It also aired Shattered, which stars Callum Keith Rennie as a homicide detective suffering from dissociative identity disorder.

On 1 December 2010, Universal Channel launched a specific feed which targets Ireland. Universal Channel in Ireland airs localised advertising. The Irish feed does not include subtitles. TV3 act as the Irish variation's advertising sales agents.

On 31 July 2013, Universal Channel unveiled a refreshed branding and new slogan it launched on 5 August, "100% Characters". The brand reflected "that great characters are the magnets that draw viewers back to their favourite shows - week after week".

=== As Universal TV ===
On 3 May 2018, NBCUniversal unveiled a new name and branding for its Universal Channel chain, Universal TV, launching first on the United Kingdom feed. The rebranding was intended to make the network a "destination brand that celebrates world-class, high-quality, character-driven content".

=== Closure ===
In December 2019, BT TV announced that Universal TV would be leaving the UK market along with VH1 and that the channel will close.

The channel closed down its operations on 27 January 2020, with Sky Comedy taking its place on EPG guides.

== Programming ==
=== Final programming ===
Sources:

- Gone
- Law & Order
- NCIS
- Private Eyes (now on Alibi)
- Teleshopping

=== Former programming ===
- Acceptable Risk
- Bates Motel
- Battle Creek
- The Border
- Boston Legal (now on Disney+)
- Breakout Kings
- Burden of Truth
- Chance
- Chicago Justice
- Chicago Med (now on Sky Witness)
- Cold Case (now on Prime Video)
- Community (now on ITVX)
- Condor (now on MGM+)
- Conviction
- Coroner (now on Sky Witness)
- CSI: Miami (now On Pluto TV)
- CSI: NY (now On Pluto TV)
- Damages (now on Sony One Thriller TV & ITVX)
- Departure (now on Sky Witness)
- Diagnosis: Murder
- The Disappearance
- The District
- Fairly Legal (now on Prime Video)
- The Finder
- Flashpoint
- Graceland
- Harry's Law
- House (now On Prime Video)
- How to Get Away with Murder (Now on Disney+ and Channel 4)
- In Plain Sight
- JAG
- King
- Law & Order (now on 5USA)
- Law & Order: Criminal Intent
- Law & Order: LA
- Law & Order: Special Victims Unit (now on Sky Witness)
- Law & Order: Trial By Jury
- Lie to Me (now on Disney+)
- Life
- Major Crimes (now on Alibi)
- McLeod's Daughters
- The Mentalist (now on U&Alibi)
- Monk (now on Netflix UK
- Motive
- Mr. Robot
- The Murders
- Necessary Roughness
- Numbers
- Prime Suspect
- Proven Innocent
- Psych (now on Netflix UK and Pluto TV)
- Pure Genius
- Quincy, M.E.
- Rake
- Ransom (now on 5USA)
- Rescue: Special Ops
- The Resident (now on Disney+ and 5)
- Rookie Blue (now on 5USA)
- Royal Pains
- Sea Patrol
- Second Chance
- Shattered
- Sleepy Hollow (now on Disney+)
- True Justice
- White Collar (now on Disney+ and U&Alibi)
- Without a Trace

== Sister and subsidiary channels ==
=== Universal TV HD ===
Universal TV HD, a high-definition simulcast, launched on Sky (as the Hallmark Channel HD) on 28 June 2010 at 7pm. Showing US shows like the Law & Order titles, CSI and Without a Trace in high definition.

Universal TV HD was also launched on BT TV on 1 September 2016.

=== Hallmark 2 ===
In July 2005, there were rumours that Sparrowhawk were going to launch a sister channel to the Hallmark Channel, called Hallmark 2. This was denied by a spokesperson for Hallmark who said that "a second channel from Hallmark will not be launching 'anytime soon'". Movies 24 was launched instead.

== Former logos ==
Hallmark Channel logo (2001–2010)

Universal Channel logo (2010–2013)

Universal Channel logo (2013–2018)

== See also ==
- Universal Channel
- Hallmark Channel
- Hallmark Channel (International)
