= Universal Channel (Japan) =

Japanese television channel

Universal Channel (Japan) ユニバーサル チャンネル
- Country: Japan
- Headquarters: Osaka, Japan

Ownership
- Owner: NBC Universal

History
- Launched: April 1, 2008 (as Sci-Fi Channel); April 1, 2010 (as Universal Channel)
- Closed: March 31, 2013
- Former names: Sci-Fi Channel (2008-2010)

Links
- Website: www.universalchannel.jp

Universal Channel was a Japanese television channel.

== History ==
=== 2008-2010 ===
Sci-Fi Channel was a Japanese television channel that operated from 1 April 2008 to 1 April 2010. It was the result of an agreement between NBC Universal and Jupiter Telecommunications. NBC Universal acquired Jupiter Telecommunications' subsidiary company JSBC2 and launched Sci Fi Channel on J:COM. Under the terms of the agreement, NBC Universal acquired 100% of the equity of JSBC2, which held the broadcasting license for Reality TV on the SKY PerfecTV! platform in Japan.

Sci-Fi Channel was rebranded in the US on July 7, 2009 as part of the Syfy global rebrand. Sci-Fi Channel instead rebranded in the merger with Universal Channel. Sci-Fi occupies a programming block on Universal Channel. The channel's website no longer exists, instead redirecting to The Universal Channel's website.

=== 2010 ===
On April 1, 2010, Sci-Fi Channel (Japan) was rebranded into Universal Channel (Japan); a Syfy programming block later premiered.

== Programming ==
- Alphas
- Battlestar Galactica
- Blue Bloods
- Buffy the Vampire Slayer
- Covert Affairs
- Eureka
- Fact or Faked: Paranormal Files
- Fairly Legal
- Family Ties
- Haven
- Heroes
- In Plain Sight
- Legend of the Seeker
- Miami Vice
- Psych
- Reaper
- Rookie Blue
- Sanctuary
- Suits
- Sex and the City
- Warehouse 13
- The X-Files

== See also ==
- Universal Channel
- Universal Channel Greece
- Universal Channel (Australia)
