= Comedy Central Africa =

Comedy Central
- Broadcast area: Sub-Saharan Africa
- Headquarters: Johannesburg, South Africa

Programming
- Language: English
- Picture format: 1080i HDTV (downscaled to 16:9 576i for the standard-definition feed)

Ownership
- Owner: Paramount Networks EMEAA (Paramount Skydance)
- Sister channels: MTV; Nickelodeon; Nick Jr. Nicktoons

History
- Launched: 6 December 2011; 14 years ago

Comedy Central is the African version of Comedy Central. It was launched on December 6, 2011, on the DStv platform, covering 47 countries and territories in sub-Saharan Africa. The channel airs US comedy series, either from the parent channel or from other sources, as well as local programming, made in South Africa.

== History ==
The channel launched on December 6, 2011, with American content fronting the channel in an initial phase. In 2012, Comedy Central Africa announced the first local version of the Comedy Central Roast, the first roastee being Steve Hofmeyr, causing controversy after remarks from Trevor Noah to Kuli Roberts. An edited version aired on September 24. The second roast in 2013 was sponsored by South African fast-food chain Nando's by a commercial arrangement. When the second Roast was announced in July, there was no information as to who would be the roastee for that year. In September 2013, the channel launched its charity initiative for the underprivileged South African youth, Comedy Central Cares. A stand-up event for this purpose was taped on September 25, with the aim of airing on the channel in December.

In 2015, Comedy Central Africa held ithe International Comedy Festival in Johannesburg from November 26 to December 5. The Make Life Funnier campaign in March 2017 aimed at improving the local stand-up comedy scene. Among the comedians involved were Deep Fried Man, Jason Goliath, Nik Rabinowitz, Thabiso Mhlongo and Celeste Ntuli.

In September 2021, for Heritage Month, the channel released an EP with songs from local comedians, covering a variety of musical genres. In July 2022, the channel's Stand Up For Your Comedy series entered its fourth season and gave viewers the chance to own an NFT, which increased in value depending on the laughs of the viewing audience. For Cancer Awareness Month in November 2023, the channel tied up with CanSA for the cancer awareness project Novemballs.
