= Universal Channel (Turkey) =

Television channel

- Country: Turkey

Programming
- Languages: Turkish; English (with Turkish subtitles)
- Picture format: 576i (16:9 SDTV); 1080i (HDTV)

Ownership
- Owner: NBCUniversal

History
- Launched: 17 December 2009
- Closed: 10 February 2013

Links
- Website: www.universalchannel.com.tr

Universal Channel was a Turkish pay television network, owned by Universal Networks International, a division of NBCUniversal. The network was launched in Turkey in December 2009 on D-Smart and in February 2010 on Teledünya. From March 1, 2011, the Channel is also available in its HD version exclusively on D-Smart Platform.

Universal TV broadcasts TV series and movies produced by Universal Studios, Warner Bros. International Television, 20th Century Studios and Paramount Pictures. It has aired many series for first time on Turkish TV, such as Law & Order, Flashpoint and Trauma. Also part of the programming are non-scripted shows such as Flipping Out and Million Dollar Listing.

It aired series exclusively produced by Universal Studios for the first time in Turkey, such as Rookie Blue, Haven, Shattered, and Fairly Legal. The network also showed many Hollywood blockbusters of various genres not only from Universal Pictures but also from other major Hollywood studios such as Space Jam, Maverick, Wild Wild West and Mars Attacks!.

This channel closed in February 2013.

== Programmes ==
=== Final Shows ===
- 30 Rock
- Against the Wall
- Caprica
- Eureka
- Face Off
- Fact Or Faked: Paranormal Files
- Fairly Legal
- Haven
- House M.D.
- Law & Order
- Law & Order: Criminal Intent
- Law & Order: UK
- Mercy
- Monk
- Parenthood
- Rocco's Dinner Party
- Royal Pains
- Sea Patrol
- The Cape
- The Fashion Show
- XIII: The Conspiracy

=== Former Shows ===
- 100 Questions
- Any Human Heart
- Cold Squad
- Columbo
- Covert Affairs
- Dance Your Ass Off
- Destination Truth
- Flashpoint
- Flipping Out
- Hair Battle Spectacular
- Haunted Collector
- Jersey Couture
- Law & Order: Los Angeles
- Law & Order: Trial by Jury
- Million Dollar Listing
- Outlaw
- Outsourced
- Perfect Couples
- Psych
- Rookie Blue
- Running Russell Simmons
- Shattered
- Smash
- Suits
- The Event
- The Office
- Top Design
- Trauma
- Up All Night
- Westworld

== See also ==
- Universal Channel
