= MTV Base (Africa) =

African television channel

- Broadcast area: Kenya; Nigeria; South Africa; West Africa

Programming
- Language: English
- Picture format: 1080i HDTV (downscaled to 16:9 576i for the SDTV feed)

Ownership
- Owner: Paramount Networks EMEAA
- Sister channels: BET Africa; Comedy Central Africa; Nickelodeon Africa; Nicktoons; Nick Jr. Africa; MTV Africa

History
- Launched: 22 February 2005; 21 years ago
- Closed: 1 January 2026; 9 months ago

Links
- Website: mtvbase.com

MTV Base was a 24-hour music channel from Paramount Networks EMEAA that was divided into 3 feeds; one each for South Africa, West Africa and East Africa.

== History ==
The channel was launched on 22 February 2005 with a live music special with live performances from local African and international artists, along with some music video and reality programming from MTV Europe (now MTV Global). The network also carries music awards ceremonies of MTV itself and BET from the U.S. and Europe.

On 3 July 2013, Viacom International Media Networks Africa launched a localised feed of MTV Base exclusively for South Africa, with local programming, advertising and VJs. It launched on DStv on 5 March 2019.

On 22 July 2025, it was reported that Paramount Global was looking to close it's African offices with channels like MTV Base and BET Africa shutting down.

On 9 October 2025, it was reported that MTV will be closing all its music channels outside the United States as part of massive cuts. The news was confirmed by Paramount in late November, with it and BET Africa shutting down at the end of the year. The channel ceased broadcasting at 9:00 CAT on 1 January 2026, with its 20th Anniversary special, On the Base Roundtable 2025, being the last program aired before the channel logo's rotating loop every 2 seconds, signaling its closure.
