= Universal Channel (Greece) =

Defunct Greece television channel

- Universal Channel logo
- Country: Greece
- Broadcast area: Greece, Cyprus
- Headquarters: London, United Kingdom

Programming
- Languages: Greek (only the advertisements); English (with Greek subtitles)
- Picture format: 4:3 (576i, SDTV)

Ownership
- Owner: NBCUniversal

History
- Launched: 7 May 2009
- Closed: 31 May 2012 (Greece); 31 March 2013 (Cyprus)
- Replaced by: Village Cinema (Greece); Sundance TV (Cyprus)

Links
- Website: universalchannel.gr (not available)

Universal Channel was a Greek television network, owned by Universal Networks International, a division of NBCUniversal. It debuted in Greece on May 7, 2009, exclusively on Conn-x TV, the pay-TV service of OTE, one of the major telecommunication groups in Southeastern Europe. (Note: On this reference, and other secondary sources like this one or this another one, I read Universal Channel launched in Greece on May 7, 2009, but checking out on the official website I read the channel launched on May 5, 2008.) Later, the channel broadcast in Cyprus via PrimeTel, Cablenet and CytaVision. The Channel hosted the branded block Sci Fi, the brand dedicated to science fiction, horror, fantasy and paranormal of NBCUniversal. Sci-Fi aired every Saturday from 9 PM to 1:10 AM and every Sunday starting from around 4 to 9 PM.

Universal Channel Greece broadcast TV series and movies produced by Universal Pictures, 20th Century Fox and CBS. It has aired many series for first time on Greek TV, such as Parenthood, Nurse Jackie, Flashpoint and Haven, while the Sci Fi block aired among the others Eureka, Sanctuary and non-fiction shows like Fact or Faked: Paranormal Files and Destination Truth.

Universal Channel (Greece) aired exclusive Universal Networks International series, for the first time on Greek TV, such as Rookie Blue and Fairly Legal. The network also showed many Hollywood blockbusters of various genre such as The Blues Brothers, Twelve Monkeys, Bridget Jones's Diary, Bean, Carlito's Way, Waterworld, Pitch Black, Meet Joe Black, Shakespeare in Love, Twister, Eraser and The Streets of Liberty City from 5 October 2008 to 1 October 2010. Universal Channel (Greece) was received very well by its subscribers.

May 31, 2012, NBCUniversal ceased providing Universal Channel to OTE TV and it was replaced by Village Cinema. On March 31, 2013, this channel ceased broadcasting in Cyprus and was replaced by Sundance TV.

== Programmes ==
- 30 Rock
- Boy Meets Girl
- Columbo
- Covert Affairs
- Destination Truth (Sci-Fi block)
- Eureka (Sci-Fi block)
- Flashpoint
- Flipping Out
- House M.D.
- Impact
- In Plain Sight
- Kath & Kim
- Law & Order
- Law & Order: LA
- Law & Order: UK
- Malcolm in the Middle
- Miami Social
- Million Dollar Listing
- Monk
- My Name Is Earl
- Nurse Jackie
- Parenthood
- Rookie Blue
- Sanctuary (Sci-Fi block)
- Shattered
- The Diplomat
- The Office
- The Philanthropist

== Movies ==
- Twelve Monkeys
- 15 Minutes
- 2 Fast 2 Furious
- 2012
- Bridget Jones's Diary
- Bean
- Carlito's Way
- Casper
- Deep Impact
- Dragnet
- Eraser
- Fast & Furious
- Fast Five
- Herbie: Fully Loaded
- Josie and the Pussycats
- Just Go with It
- Liar Liar
- Meet Joe Black
- Men in Black (1997 film)
- Men in Black II
- Pitch Black
- Pretty in Pink
- Proof of Life
- Shakespeare in Love
- Summer Catch
- Taxi Driver
- The Blues Brothers
- The Bourne Identity
- The Bourne Supremacy
- The Bourne Ultimatum
- The Fast and the Furious
- The Fast and the Furious: Tokyo Drift
- The Matrix
- The Matrix Reloaded
- The Matrix Revolutions
- The Mummy
- The Murder House Rules
- The One
- The Powerpuff Girls Movie
- The Streets of Liberty City (5 October 2008, 29 April 2009, 1 October 2010)
- Tirea-Vanin
- Top Gun
- True Lies
- Twister
- Waterworld'

== See also ==
- Universal TV
