= Universal Channel (Asia) =

Defunct asia television channel

- Universal Channel logo
- Country: Singapore
- Network: NBCUniversal International Networks
- Headquarters: Singapore

Programming
- Picture format: 480i (SDTV) 16:9; 1080i (HDTV)

Ownership
- Owner: NBCUniversal
- Sister channels: CNBC Asia; DIVA; E! Golf Channel; Syfy; DreamWorks Channel; Euronews

History
- Launched: July 1, 2008; 18 years ago
- Closed: June 30, 2017; 9 years ago (Malaysia); July 1, 2017; 9 years ago (Rest of Asia)
- Former names: Universal Channel (Philippines only, July 26, 2010-August 3, 2012)

Links
- Website: www.universalchannel.asia

Universal Channel was a television channel specializing in movies and television series in the thriller, drama, comedy, crime and investigation genres. It was owned by Universal Networks International. This channel was launched in Singapore on 1 July 2008 along with Sci Fi.

The first on-air broadcast saw the official slogan launch: It's the People Who Make Us. On 24 July 2010, the second on-air look with colorful visual ident theme and the official slogan was Characters Welcome as well as the channel converting from 4:3 aspect ratio to 16:9 widescreen picture format from 8 February 2011. It brought the latest of new series, including two Asian TV premiere series, as well as returning to first seasons of almost all programs already aired.

On 28 January 2014, the Universal Channel refreshed itself alongside other transformations. Among the changes under the rebrand included the channel aligning itself with the international logo and slogan 100% Characters. The channel brought the Same Day or Express from the U. S. telecast with selected programs.

After nine years of broadcasting, Universal Channel along with Syfy ceased broadcasting at midnight on 1 July 2017, in the rest of the Asia. In Malaysia, the channel discontinued a day earlier. The channel programmed with a finale episode of Shades of Blue on that day, an ending with the season one finale "One Last Lie" before going off-the-air. Most of the programs of Universal Channel were moved to Diva.

== Operating channels ==
- Universal Channel Asia HD - SG/HK/MY/PHP/JKT feed; available on HD format in selected Asian countries
- Universal Channel Asia - same as the Asian feed; available on SD format in Indonesia, Malaysia and Sri Lanka
- Universal Channel Philippines - same as the Asian feed but with local advertisements.
- Universal Channel Taiwan - same as the Asian feed with Chinese subtitles; available on HD format

== Programming ==
=== Final shows ===
- Bullseye
- Caught on Camera
- Chicago Fire
- Chicago P.D.
- Criminal Minds
- Grimm
- Law & Order
- Minute to Win It
- Motive
- Ninja Warrior UK
- Shades of Blue
- Tricked

=== Shows ===
- American Gladiators
- Animals Unleashed
- Australian Gladiators
- Bad Robots
- Bates Motel
- Bent
- Cold Case
- Crusoe
- The Dead Zone
- The Event
- Flashpoint
- Greek
- House
- I Survived a Japanese Game Show
- Ironside (2013)
- Just for Laughs Gags
- Keith Barry: Brain Hacker
- Law and Order Franchise
  - Law & Order
  - Law & Order: Criminal Intent
  - Law & Order: Los Angeles
  - Law & Order: Special Victims Unit
  - Law & Order: UK
- The Librarians
- Life
- Magic Man
- Million Dollar Money Drop
- Monk
- The Office
- Outsourced
- Penn & Teller: Fool Us
- Prank Science
- The Pretender
- Profiler
- Psych
- Quarterlife
- Royal Pains
- Same Name
- Sea Patrol
- The Secret Life of the American Teenager
- Shattered
- The Tonight Show with Jay Leno
- Whitney
- Wizard Wars

=== Specials ===
- AFI Lifetime Achievement Award: A Tribute to Mike Nichols
- Miss Universe 2008

== See also ==
- Universal Channel in various countries
