= Starmax HD =

Spanish satellite TV platform

Starmax HD was a Spanish satellite television platform which broadcast using the Hispasat 1E satellite, using a prepaid model, offering theme channels in both standard and high-definition. The service lasted little more than three months before shutting down in 2011.

== History ==
In early 2011, Starmax HD announced its intention to operate in the pay television environment. The company was a subsidiary of British telecommunications company Starmax, which made agreements with antenna installer Anvimur, decoder manufacturer Ferguson and French company Globecast, which was responsible for the transponders. On 9 March 2011, it signed an agreement with KidsCo to carry the channel on its platform.

Test broadcasts began on 29 March 2011 with a single package of twelve channels (nine of which available at the time) and the possibility of receiving digital terrestrial television signals and satellite, featuring a decoder with USB recording capabilities. The other advantage was using prepaid subscriptions, which were new to Spain. This enabled subscribers to pay monthly subscriptions in advance without using personal data. Subscriptions lasted for two months or a full year, and cost ten euros, though this depended on the length of the subscription.

Discovery Communications launched Discovery World HD exclusively on the platform. On 18 April 2011, it started carrying FilmBox and FilmBox España from SPI International.

On the afternoon of 1 July 2011, Starmax HD reportedly stopped operating, alleging technical difficulties. It was suggested that its suspension was due to lack of payments with Hispasat, as well as the suspension of its official website. On 3 July, the company announced on social media that it would resolve the issue. It subsequently announced the suspension of the service, expecting a return in September at earliest. Under the new plans, it would provide twelve to twenty channels.

Finally on 26 December 2011, it was announced that Starmax HD would leave the Spanish market and liquidated its stock of decoders to Anvimur.

== Channels ==
Throughout its brief existence, Starmax HD only carried these channels:

- BBC Entertainment
- MGM HD
- Natura
- Eurosport HD
- KidsCo
- FilmBox
- Discovery World HD
- Somos
- XTRM
- Eurosport 2
- Cinematk
- FilmBox España
