= Gone (2017 TV series) =

2017 police procedural television series

- Promotional title card for Gone used by Foxtel in Australia
- Genre: Police procedural; Crime drama
- Created by: Matt Lopez
- Based on: One Kick by Chelsea Cain
- Starring: Leven Rambin; Danny Pino; Andy Mientus; Chris Noth; Tracie Thoms
- Countries of origin: Germany; France; United States
- Original language: English
- No. of seasons: 1
- No. of episodes: 12

Production
- Executive producers: Matt Lopez; JoAnn Alfano; Melissa R. Byer; Treena Hancock; Kim Moses; Barry O'Brien; Sara Colleton
- Running time: 45 minutes
- Production companies: The Colleton Company; The Neptune Way; VOX; TF1; NBCUniversal International Studios

Original release
- Network: TF1 (France); VOX (Germany)
- Release: 13 November 2017 – 12 February 2018

Gone is an internationally co-produced police procedural crime drama television series created by Matt Lopez and produced by NBCUniversal International Studios. Based on Chelsea Cain's 2014 novel One Kick, the series revolves around Kit "Kick" Lannigan (Leven Rambin), a child abduction survivor, who is recruited by FBI agent Frank Novak (Chris Noth) for a special task force dedicated to solving missing persons cases. The supporting cast features Danny Pino as John Bishop, Andy Mientus as James Finley and Tracie Thoms as FBI agent Maya Kennedy.

Despite being produced by TF1 in France and RTL Television's sister network VOX in Germany, the series had its world premiere in Australia on Universal Channel on 13 November 2017. In France, the series premiered on TF1, beginning on 23 January 2018 and ending on 27 February 2018. In Germany, the series aired on VOX a day after the French broadcast. In the United Kingdom, the series premiered on Universal Channel on 19 March 2018. In the United States, WGN America acquired the rights to the series in June 2018; it was set to be shown on that channel in early 2019.

== Plot ==
Katherine "Kit/Kick" Lannigan survives a childhood abduction and is rescued by FBI agent Frank Novak. In the years since, a determined Kick trains in martial arts and the use of firearms. Novak persuades her to join a special task force that he created which is dedicated to solving abductions and missing persons cases.

== Cast ==
=== Main ===
- Leven Rambin as Kit "Kick" Lannigan: A former child abduction victim, Kit Lannigan was "raised" by her abductors for five years until found by FBI agent Frank Novak and returned home. She initially had trouble coping with this shift in her life until Frank suggested she take self-defence classes to deal with her aggression, which inspired her to legally change her name to "Kick" to reflect her personal growth. She has never attended college but owns her own self-defence centre and has a keen insight into the psychology of abductors and abductees from her background. She has recently learned that her abductors were part of a still-active network of child traffickers, forcing her to confront Mel Foster once again to find more information about the old network.
- Chris Noth as Frank Novak: The FBI agent who rescued Kick from her abductors when she was a child, he has maintained a strong presence in her life after she returned to her family, to the point where Kick has explicitly referred to him as a father figure. When he received permission to put together his current task force, which travels the country in a personalized plane to deal with abduction cases throughout America, Novak recruited Kick as he recognized the value of her unique perspective on abduction cases. In "Secuestrado", it is revealed that he has an estranged daughter who he rarely sees after his marriage broke up due to his focus on his work, and Kick is also shocked to learn that he had a brief affair with her mother after she was rescued.
- Danny Pino as John Bishop: A new FBI agent who has previously served with the military; it was revealed in "Tiger" that Bishop was actually involved in Novak's first ever abduction case, when he witnessed his twin brother Mark being taken when he and Mark were just six years old.
- Andy Mientus as James Finley: Another former abduction victim, James was Kick's roommate and a keen computer hacker even before joining Novak's task force. He is gay and has had a couple of dates interrupted due to his role in the task force, but clearly enjoys the chance to make a difference. "Romans" reveals that he was abducted when he was fourteen after his father told him to leave the family when he came out, and James has not seen any of his family since then until his brother and mother contact him about his father's funeral; this episode also reveals that his mother is deaf.
- Tracie Thoms as Maya Kennedy: An FBI agent on Novak's original task force, she stayed with Novak when he established the new task force. Her father owned an auto-repair shop and took her camping when she was a child.

=== Recurring ===
- Kelly Rutherford as Paula Lannigan: Kick's mother, who has created a reputation for herself as a spokesperson for families dealing with similar cases, leaving Kick frustrated at her mother's conflicting encouragement to get over her own abduction case while she uses it to fund a career. It was revealed in "Secuestrado" that she had a brief affair with Frank after he rescued Kick.
- Jordan Bridges as Neil Pruitt: A paparazzi photographer who is invasive in his efforts to take photos of Kick.
- Christopher O'Shea as Noah: A childhood friend of Kick's, and the only one who didn't treat her strangely when she was returned to her family; the two started dating after he moved to Pittsburgh.
- Lee Tergesen as Mel Foster: Kick's abductor. It is strongly implied that he was once the head of the network that abducted Kick and other children, but there is no conclusive evidence to support that theory. After years of sending her letters that she never opened, Mel met Kick once again when a case forced her to talk to him due to a possible link to his old network, during which he 'defended' his abductions as taking children from undeserving parents.

== Episodes ==
No.	Title	Directed by	Written by	Original release date	Australian viewers
1	"Pilot"	John Terlesky	Matt Lopez	13 November 2017	62,000
2	"Ride"	John Terlesky	Matt Lopez	20 November 2017	40,000
The team investigates a new local ride-booking app when college girls using the app go missing. Kick suspects the culprit is app developer Dylan Bender, who was suspected of sexually assaulting student Holly Greco while in college, but no charges were filed. However, the team learns that the kidnappings were orchestrated by Holly's fiancé Stephen to bring negative publicity towards the app and get revenge against Dylan. After Kick and Bishop stop Stephen, Holly reports her assault to the police, leading to Dylan being arrested and harming the app's IPO.
3	"Crystal"	Thomas Carter	Meredith Averill	27 November 2017	45,000
4	"Tiger"	Thomas Carter	Michael Brandon Guercio	4 December 2017	34,000
5	"Savior"	John Gray	Barry O'Brien	18 December 2017	42,000
6	"Family Photo"	John Gray	Pamela Davis	11 December 2017	N/A
7	"Don't Go"	Jan Eliasberg	Melissa R. Byer & Treena Hancock	8 January 2018	37,000
8	"Romans"	Jan Eliasberg	Pamela Davis	15 January 2018	52,000
9	"Exigent Circumstances"	John Scott	Mary Trahan	22 January 2018	44,000
10	"Secuestrado"	John Scott	Story by : Barry O'Brien and Melissa R. Byer & Treena Hancock; Teleplay by : Melissa R. Byer & Treena Hancock	29 January 2018	41,000
11	"Demons"	Brad Turner	Matt Lopez	5 February 2018	33,000
12	"Rise"	Brad Turner	Matt Lopez	12 February 2018	N/A
