= Nicktoons (Sub-Saharan Africa) =

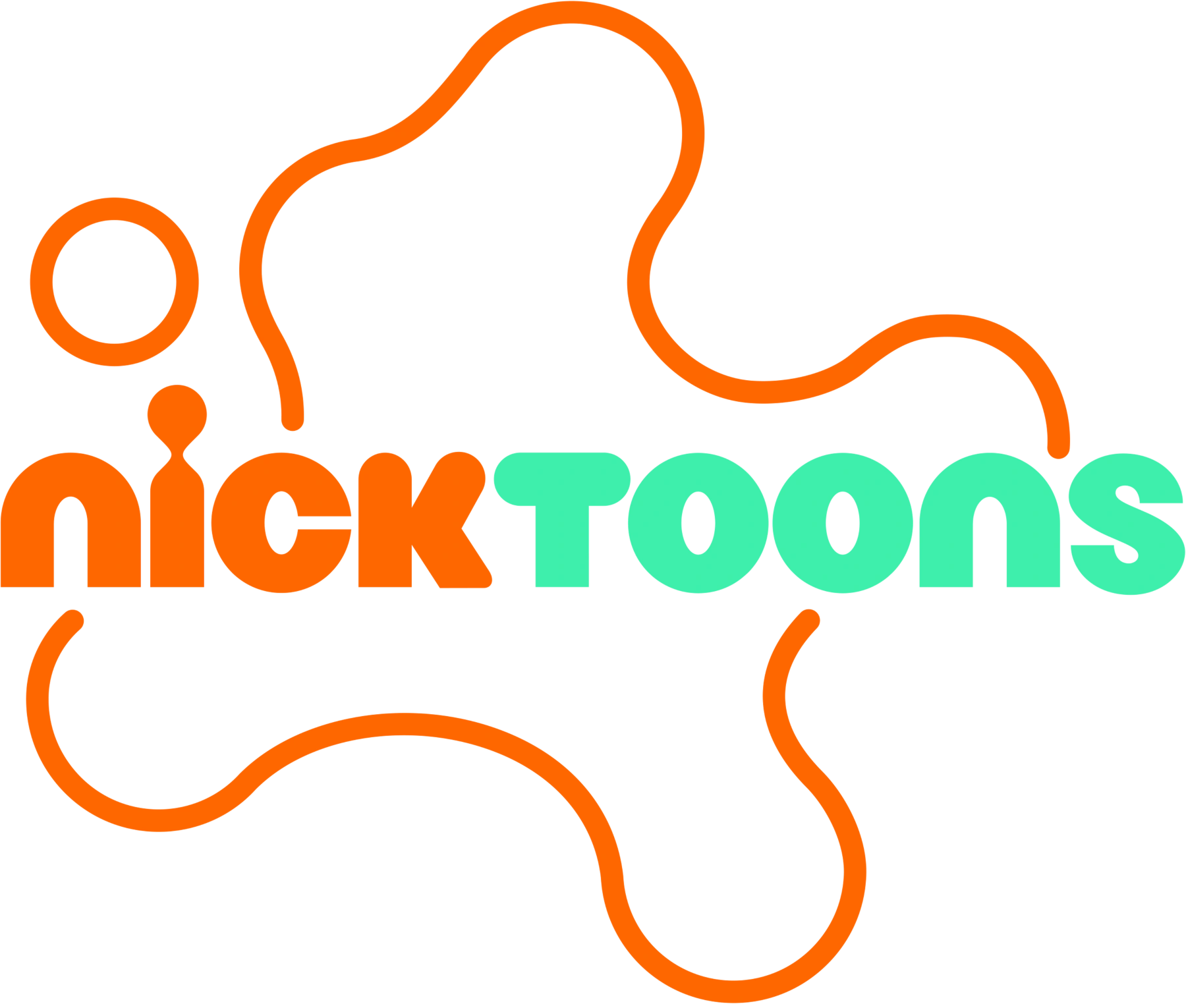
- Country: South Africa
- Broadcast area: Sub-Saharan Africa
- Headquarters: Johannesburg, South Africa

Programming
- Languages: English; Afrikaans isiZulu; Amharic
- Picture format: 16:9 576p SDTV

Ownership
- Owner: Paramount Networks EMEAA (Paramount Skydance)
- Parent: Nickelodeon Group
- Sister channels: MTV; Nickelodeon; Nick Jr. Comedy Central Africa

History
- Launched: 30 September 2014; 12 years ago

Links
- Website: Official website

Availability

Terrestrial
- DStv: Channel 308
- GOtv: Channel 86

Nicktoons is a South African pay television channel that was launched on 30 September 2014. It is owned by Paramount Networks EMEAA, and is targeted towards children, broadcasting reruns of original animated series from sister network Nickelodeon along with other cartoons. It replaced the African feed of KidsCo, North Africa receives the Arabic-Language feed of the channel Nicktoons MENA.

Unlike other Nicktoons feeds (since October 2021), the end credits on shows no longer appear and were not replaced with short credits used by its sister channels.

== History ==
Former Nicktoons logo, used as a screenbug until the rebrand

In November 2013, it was announced that KidsCo would be discontinued following year during Valentine's Day and MultiChoice mentioned seeking possibly replacements for the channel at the time.

In June 2014, during MultiChoice's financial presentation ended March 31, 2014 the channel was unveiled alongside Lifetime both of which weren't available at the time. From September 30, 2014, the channel launched on DStv, alongside sister channel Nick Jr. and BET.

In June 2017, the Kenya Film Classification Board (KFCB), headed by CEO Ezekiel Mutua, ordered a ban on six series airing on Cartoon Network, Nickelodeon, and Nicktoons for allegedly promoting homosexual themes to minors, including Hey Arnold!, The Legend of Korra, and The Loud House.

The channel introduced a Nick Jr. block in 2017, which airs every morning.

Some-time in 2020, Nicktoons Africa started using the 2014 US branding, making it the first international Nicktoons feed to use it, as other Nicktoons channels like NickToons CEE and NickToons UK & Ireland were still using the 2014 UK branding at that time, even though Nicktoons Africa used a mix of 2014 UK along with the US brand.

From May 17, 2021, a new musical program known as NickMusic launched on the channel airing weekdays at 4 PM.

From October 2021, Nicktoons started using the 2014 UK branding again, on the same month, The Loud House and Rise of the Teenage Mutant Ninja Turtles returned to the channel alongside the premiere of The Casagrandes, The Barbarian and the Troll, Middlemost Post and It's Pony alongside the rebrand. Promos for Kamp Koral: SpongeBob's Under Years are show on the channel but does not air on the channel. Unlike the original, the promos don't show the variants and were replaced with alternate logo with SpongeBob's eyes (or Cosmo's eyes during commercial breaks) replacing the O's and mixed with Nickelodeon's current branding which don't show any text other than the Nicktoons logo, similar to Disney Channel Africa's mix of the 2014 Glass age branding and 2019 US Item age branding in promos and the 2017 European Graffiti age branding in bumpers and for its on-screen bug until June 24, 2022, even though the US branding was still used for bumpers of a few shows like Peppa Pig and Horrid Henry.

In the same month, some shows like Munki & Trunk were removed from the channel in favour of new programming. But in July 2022, Munki & Trunk and Zoofari returned to the channel as other shows made specifically for Nicktoons Africa (Such as Moosebox) have not yet returned to the channel.

On July 14, 2022, SpongeBob SquarePants aired on Nicktoons in Zulu-speaking language for the first time. From December of the same year, this will only air in said language at 7 AM and 2PM on weekends.

In December 2022, Nicktoons aired a promo for new episodes of Zulu dubbed SpongeBob. This also used the endboard from the 2020 refresh, which were disbanded by October 2021. No other recent promos have used this endboard, as all of the promos on the channel currently are just used from the Global feed of NickToons.

In March 2023, NickToons suddenly repositioned their screenbug to where the original USA NickToons channel put it, for an unknown reason.

In June 2023, NickToons started reusing its US branding next bumpers for a lot of shows, which is a sign of the channel soon reverting the change from October 2021.

On May 21, 2024, it was announced that SpongeBob SquarePants would air on Nicktoons in Afrikaans-speaking language starting on June 17 of the same year.
