= Hallmark Family =

American cable television channel

- Country: United States
- Broadcast area: Nationwide
- Headquarters: Studio City, California

Programming
- Language: English

Ownership
- Owner: Hallmark Media
- Sister channels: Hallmark Channel; Hallmark Mystery

History
- Launched: October 1, 2017; 9 years ago
- Former names: Hallmark Drama (2017–2024)

Links
- Website: www.hallmarkfamily.com

Availability

Streaming media
- Service(s): Frndly TV, fuboTV, Philo, Sling TV, Hulu + Live TV, YouTube TV

Hallmark Family (formerly Hallmark Drama) is an American cable television channel owned by Hallmark Cards' Hallmark Media. It is the sister channel to Hallmark Channel and Hallmark Mystery, and focuses on family-friendly dramatic storytelling.

== History ==
In 2009, Crown Media Holdings and Hallmark chairman Donald J. Hall Jr. announced a new Hallmark network called "Hallmark Drama Channel". It was set to launch in March 2010, but the project was cancelled.

Original name & logo, used from 2017 to 2024

In 2017, Hallmark revisited the concept, and set a new launch date of October 1, 2017. The channel's first original programs, the cooking competition series Christmas Cookie Matchup and special Project Christmas Joy, premiered in early December 2019.

On February 6, 2024, Hallmark Media announced Hallmark Drama would become Hallmark Family on February 28, 2024.

== Programming ==
Hallmark Family's programming consists of family friendly movies and TV series from acquired content and Hallmark network library that are not being aired on either of its sister channels, Hallmark Channel or Hallmark Movies & Mysteries. TV series airing on Hallmark Family include Matlock, Little House on the Prairie, The Waltons, and Magnum, P.I.

The channel's first original movies were announced on July 26, 2019 as a JL Family Ranch sequel and a Signed, Sealed, Delivered franchise installment slated for 2020.

== See also ==
- List of Hallmark Channel Original Movies
