= Nickelodeon (Sub-Saharan African TV channel) =

Children's television channel in Africa

- Nickelodeon logo used since 2023 (Note: The logo's wordmark has been in use since 2010. Additionally, there is a variant meant to be used for white backgrounds; the main variant has a white wordmark in conjunction with a fully orange splat.)
- Country: South Africa
- Broadcast area: Sub-Saharan Africa
- Headquarters: Johannesburg, South Africa

Programming
- Languages: English; Afrikaans; Amharic (Ethiopia)
- Picture format: HDTV 1080i

Ownership
- Owner: Paramount Networks EMEAA (Skydance Corporation); Multichoice (GOtv and DStv version only)
- Parent: Nickelodeon Group
- Sister channels: MTV; Nick Jr. Nicktoons; Comedy Central

History
- Launched: June 12, 1999; 27 years ago (block); July 1, 2008; 18 years ago (channel)

Links
- Website: www.nickelodeonafrica.com

Nickelodeon (commonly shortened as Nick) is a South African 24-hour television channel owned by Paramount Networks EMEAA. The channel was launched on July 1, 2008. North Africa receives the Arabic-language version of the channel Nickelodeon MENA.

Unlike other Nickelodeon feeds and much like the German and Dutch feeds, the end credits on shows (except on interstitial shows) never appear. They were replaced by short credits including the show name, production year and production company and much like the European feed, the promos and bumpers do not contain any text other than the Nickelodeon logo (prior to 2023 in the case of promos). This is also includes Nick Jr. since it launched on Nicktoons since 2021. SpongeBob SquarePants in Afrikaans, isiZulu and English will premiere on Nicktoons (DStv channel 308)

== History ==
Logo used 2010, used concurrently with the 2023 logo.

Nick logo for short used as the secondary on-screen bug from 2010 to 2023

Before it was a channel, it was a block on the South African children's channel KTV and Koowee. Nickelodeon was launched as a channel on July 1, 2008. In 2012, it received new bumpers, promo, and continuity. Later in 2014, Nicktoons was launched as a replacement for the discontinued Kidsco alongside Nick Jr., another channel from Viacom (now Paramount). Nick Jr and Nicktoons share the same website as Nickelodeon until Nick Jr. launched its own website.

In June 2017, the Kenya Film Classification Board (KCFB), headed by CEO Ezekiel Mutua, ordered a ban on six cartoons airing on Cartoon Network Africa, Nickelodeon Africa and Nicktoons Africa for allegedly promoting LGBT themes to minors. The shows affected are the currently-running Cartoon Network shows Adventure Time, Clarence and Steven Universe, in addition to the already ended Nickelodeon shows Hey Arnold! and The Legend of Korra, and the currently running Nickelodeon cartoon The Loud House, although The Loud House returned to Nicktoons Africa in late 2021, similar to that of Cartoon Network Africa with Adventure Time and Disney Channel Africa with The Owl House.

In 2018, Viacom merged official websites of Southeast Asian, Middle Eastern and African versions of Nickelodeon into nick.tv. Along the way Nickelodeon adapted two feeds with the South African feed airing series banned from the channel such as The Loud House and Bubble Guppies.

On March 5, 2019, Nickelodeon (South Africa only) along with Comedy Central, BET, MTV and MTV Base were available in HD on DStv. The Nickelodeon channel in South Africa has a separate feed from the rest of Africa, with different programming and schedule.

In 2020, the channel relaunched its Nick Jr programming block, airing from 5 a.m (CAT) to 7 a.m (CAT) daily (previously 5 a.m (CAT) to 6:30 a.m (CAT) on weekdays and 5 a.m (CAT) to 7:00 a.m (CAT) on weekends). However, the block is not available on the South African feed.

On May 17, 2021, NickMusic was launched as a TV program on NickToons, airing on weekdays at 4 p.m.(CAT).

In July 2022, Nickelodeon was made available on Startimes ON in selected countries as a supplement of DreamWorks Channel which was removed from StarTimes and StarSat on February 17, 2022, and relaunched on DStv on March 18, 2022.

On August 1, 2023, the channel rebranded to its current era nearly 5 months after its rebrand in the U.S.

== Feeds ==
Nickelodeon Africa is divided into two feeds for its broadcast in the Sub-Saharan African region with each feed carrying its own schedule and programming.

- Feed 1: South Africa (Its headquarters is based from Johannesburg, South Africa).
- Feed 2: Rest of Sub-Saharan Africa (its headquarters is based from Nigeria).

== Programming ==
=== Current programming ===
- SpongeBob SquarePants (July 1, 2008 – present)
- Alvinnn!!! and the Chipmunks (2019–present)
- Danger Force (October 18, 2020 – present)
- Tyler Perry's Young Dylan (2020–present)
- Side Hustle (2021–present)
- The Loud House (2016–present) (Note: Still airing on the South African feed and on Nicktoons)
- The Casagrandes (2020–present)
- Are You Afraid of the Dark? (revival) (October 2020 – present)
- Goldie's Oldies (2020–present)
- Rugrats (2021–present)
- Kamp Koral: SpongeBob's Under Years (2021–present)
- The Smurfs (2021–present)
- Overlord and the Underwoods (2022–present)
- Star Trek: Prodigy (April 18, 2022 – present)
- The Patrick Star Show (pre-premiere May 13, 2022; official premiere May 16, 2022 – present)
- Warped! (May 30, 2022 – present)
- The Barbarian and the Troll (July 18, 2022 – present) (Note: Previously seen on Nicktoons)
- Middlemost Post (August 8, 2022 – present)
- The Fairly OddParents: Fairly Odder (September 5, 2022 – present)
- Big Nate (October 5, 2022 – present)
- Rock Island Mysteries (October 17, 2022 – present)
- Transformers: EarthSpark (November 28, 2022 – present)
- Monster High (April 8, 2023 - 2025)
- The Twisted Timeline of Sammy & Raj (July 3, 2023 – present)
- Best & Bester (July 31, 2023 – present)

==== Shorts ====
- Athleticious (2022–present)
- Zelly Go (2020–present)

==== Reruns ====
- Henry Danger (2015-October 18,2020,2020-Present)
- The Thundermans (2014-August 27,2018,August 28, 2018 – present)
- ICarly (2009-April 12,2013,2013-14,2018,January 1,2026-Present)
- Victorious(December 4,2010-November 30,2013,2013-15,2019,January 1,2026-Present)
- Sam & Cat(November 4,2013-November 2014,2014-16,2018,2021,2026-Present)

==== Nick Jr. programming ====
- Paw Patrol (2020–present)
- Deer Squad (2021–present)
- Santiago of the Seas (December 2021 – present)
- Baby Shark's Big Show! (2022–present)
- Blue's Clues & You! (2021, June 1, 2022 – present)
- Blaze and the Monster Machines (2020 - 2021, June 4, 2022 - present)
- Bubble Guppies (2020 - 2021, June 4, 2022 - present)

=== Former programming ===
- The Fairly OddParents (July 1, 2008 - 2018, 2018 - 2021) (Note: Now on Nicktoons)
- Danny Phantom (July 1, 2008 - 2012)
- The Penguins of Madagascar (2010 - 2015)
- Kung Fu Panda: Legends of Awesomeness (2011 - 2016)
- Cousins for Life (April 1, 2019 - June 2019)
- iCarly (2009 - April 12, 2013) (Note: Still airing on the South African feed)
- Big Time Rush (2010 - 2013)
- The Troop (2010 - 2014)
- True Jackson, VP (2009 - 2012)
- Supah Ninjas (2011-2014)
- Drake and Josh ( July 1, 2008 - 2013)
- Bucket & Skinner's Epic Adventures (2011 - 2013)
- House of Anubis (June 13, 2011 - 2014)
- Unfabulous (2008 - 2012)
- The Mighty B! (2009 - 2012)
- T.U.F.F. Puppy (2011 - 2014)
- Power Rangers Samurai (2011 - 2013)
- The Haunted Hathaways (December 9, 2013 - 2015)
- Planet Sheen (2011 - 2013)
- Back at the Barnyard (2009 - 2012)
- The Adventures of Jimmy Neutron, Boy Genius ( July 1, 2008 - 2013)
- Avatar: The Last Airbender (July 1, 2008 - 2012)
- The Legend of Korra (September 1, 2012 - 2015)
- CatDog (July 1, 2008 - 2012)
- Fanboy & Chum Chum (2010 - 2013)
- Knight Squad (June 11, 2018 - May 24, 2019)
- Marvin Marvin (2013)
- Fred: The Show (2012)
- Max & Shred (2014 - 2016)
- Sanjay and Craig (2014 - 2017)
- Breadwinners (October 2014 - 2016)
- Pig Goat Banana Cricket (2016 - 2017)
- ToonMarty (2017)
- Harvey Beaks (2016)
- Bella and the Bulldogs (2016)
- Victorious (December 4, 2010 - November 30, 2013)
- Hunter Street (May 22nd, 2017 - Present)
- Game Shakers (February 8, 2016 - June 10,2019;2019-2021
- Nicky, Ricky, Dicky & Dawn (January 26,2015-August 22,2018)
- School of Rock (November 7, 2016- May 25, 2018, 2019–2021)
- Sam & Cat (2013 - 2014, 2014 - 2021)
- Teenage Mutant Ninja Turtles (November 25th, 2012 - 2018)
- Rise of the Teenage Mutant Ninja Turtles (2018 - 2020)
- Lego Jurassic World: Legend of Isla Nublar (2019 - 2020)
- The Substitute (2020)
- It's Pony (2020 - 2021)
- Atchoo! (2020)
- 44 Cats (2020 - 2021) (Note: Previously seen on Nicktoons and Nick Jr.)
- Ollie's Pack (2020)
- Instant Mom (2020 - 2021) (Note: Now on BET)
- See Dad Run (2020 - 2021)
- NOOBees (2020 - 2021) (Note: South African feed only)
- Spyders (2021)
- The Astronauts (2021 - 2022)
- Drama Club (2021)

==== Nick Jr. programming ====
- Butterbean's Café (2020 - 2021)
- The Adventures of Paddington (2021) (Note: Now on Nick Jr.)
- Barbapapa: One Big Happy Family! (2021)
- Top Wing (2021)

== Sister channels ==
=== Nicktoons ===
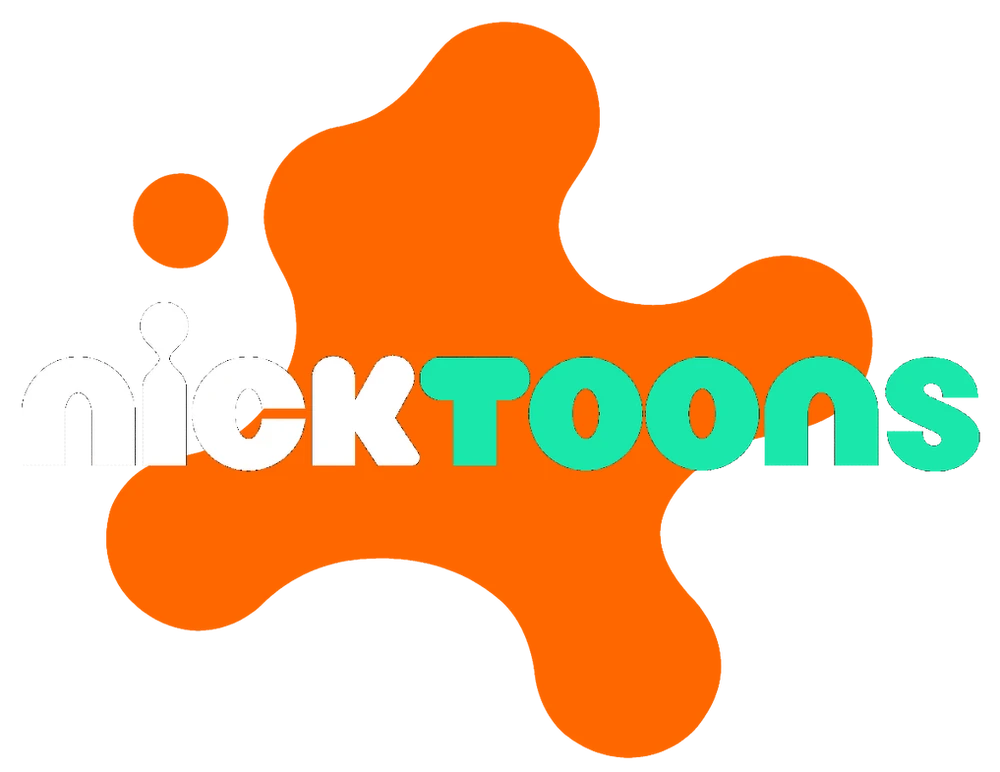
Nicktoons logo

Nicktoons Africa is a sister-channel of Nickelodeon that airs reruns of animated series from Nickelodeon along with other cartoons. The channel was launched on 30 September 2014 as a replacement to Kidsco on DStv.

=== Nick Jr. ===
Nick Jr. logo

Nick Jr. Africa is a sister-channel of Nickelodeon that is aimed at pre-school children. The channel was launched on 30 September 2014. The channel also has an Ethiopian feed.

== See also ==
- Nickelodeon (Middle Eastern & North African TV channel) (also distributed in Africa)
- Nickelodeon (French TV channel) (also distributed in Africa)
- Nickelodeon (Spanish & Portuguese TV channel) (also distributed in Africa)
