= Kermit Channel =

Defunct television channel in Asia

- Broadcast area: Taiwan (1998-2000); India (1999-2002); Indonesia (1999-2000); Philippines (1999-2000)

Programming
- Languages: English; Mandarin (subtitled)
- Picture format: 576i/480i SDTV

Ownership
- Owner: The Jim Henson Company (50%); Hallmark Entertainment
- Sister channels: Hallmark Entertainment Network; Odyssey Network

History
- Launched: 31 August 1998; 27 years ago
- Closed: 22 December 2002; 23 years ago

The Kermit Channel was an Asian television channel that was owned by the Jim Henson Company and Hallmark Entertainment until 2001, when Hallmark assumed full ownership and renamed the channel. It was a 24-hour cable channel that broadcast reruns of various Muppet productions.

== History ==
Hallmark Entertainment and The Jim Henson Company started a partnership in May 1998 to launch the Kermit Channel in Asia and Latin America expected to launch in September 1998 with distribution handled by Hallmark Entertainment Network. This partnership had grown out of their co-production of Gulliver’s Travels. In 1998, Kermit had extended a license for the Muppet to Wave, a Singapore-based licensing agent, for apparel, toys and games categories in Taiwan and the Philippines.

On August 31, 1998, the channel had a soft launch in Latin America and Asia with a revolving three-hour schedule. The next day, the channel's first general manager, Betsy Bruce, was announced. The Henson Co. and Hallmark considered renaming the Odyssey Channel to Kermit Channel. A full schedule was put into place on October 1, 1998.

The channel was launched first in Taiwan in January 1999, followed by India, which debuted in the first week in January 1999 with distribution and marketing handled by Modi Entertainment Network. The channel was next rolled out in Indonesia. With uncertain over the market downturn, the Kermit Channel decided to focus on the Asia market. Kermit's launch was delayed until August 1999 in the Philippines. By December 1, 1999, the channel had six million subscribers earlier than projected by its business plan. The next markets the channel was planned to be launched in were Singapore and Malaysia, while considering Japan and China. However by January 2000, Hallmark Entertainment Networks decided to instead to focus on existing markets, India, Malaysia and the Philippines, to build up capacity in distribution and brand awareness.

As part of the reorganization of the Hallmark Entertainment, programming on The Kermit Channel in Asia was transferred in November 2000 to the Hallmark Network. On Hallmark it would initially air as a six-hour-a-day block, but was later shortened to three hours a day. In November 2002, the Asian channel was shut down except in India. The Kermit Channel aired in India, until December 2002. Kermit was shut down due to the decision of the Henson Company's owner, EM.TV. Hallmark Entertainment Network and Modi were in discussion to replace the channel with a joint venture family channel.

== Programming ==
Hallmark Entertainment and the Jim Henson Company were contributing their film libraries towards the channel. Additional programming were acquired from Children's Television Workshop (CTW) until 2000.

Programming blocks

- Children's educational block
- Preschool block, is four hours long and home to the CTW programming

Shows

- Aliens in the Family
- Blackstar
- Muppets Tonight
- Adventures
- Brats of the Lost Nebula
- The Secret World of Alex Mack
- BraveStarr
- Tarzán
- Zorro (1990 TV series)
- Christy (TV series)
- Preschool block:
  - The Animal Show
  - Construction Site
  - Encyclopedia, a live-action educational show based on an encyclopedia's pages
  - Fraggle Rock
  - The Ghost of Faffner Hall
  - Pappyland
  - Mopatop's Shop
  - Muppet Babies
  - Open Sesame (August 31, 1998 - 2000)
  - Sesame Street (seasons 1-27; 1969-1996 episodes only) (August 31, 1998 - 2000)
  - The Wubbulous World of Dr. Seuss
