= Hallmark Media =

U.S. media production company

- Formerly: Crown Media Holdings (1991–2022); Hallmark Entertainment (1994–2000)
- Type: Subsidiary
- Traded as: Nasdaq: CRWN
- Industry: Broadcasting
- Predecessor: Jones Crown Partners
- Founded: 1991; 35 years ago in Dallas, Texas, United States
- Headquarters: Studio City, Los Angeles, California, United States
- Number of locations: 5 (2014)
- Area served: United States
- Key people: Donald J. Hall Jr. (chairman); Darren Abbott (president)
- Products: Telefilms; Novels; Podcasts
- Brands: Hallmark Hall of Fame; Hallmark Channel; Hallmark Original; Hallmark Publishing
- Services: Cable channels Video streaming
- Number of employees: 208 (2014)
- Parent: Hallmark Cards
- Divisions: Crown Connectivity
- Subsidiaries: Crown Media International; Crown Media United States, LLC; Crown Media Productions, LLC; Crown Media Publishing, LLC; Crown Media Family Networks (Hallmark Channel, Hallmark Family, & Hallmark Mystery)

Hallmark Media (formerly Crown Media Holdings) is an American media production company with corporate headquarters located in Studio City, California, and is a subsidiary of Hallmark Cards.

Hallmark Media consists of cable television networks Hallmark Channel, Hallmark Mystery, Hallmark Family, and streaming service Hallmark+ as well the Hallmark Hall of Fame.

== History ==
=== Precursors ===
Since 1951, Hallmark Cards has owned the Hallmark Hall of Fame anthology movie series and later its corresponding production company, Hallmark Hall of Fame Productions. From 1990 to 1996, Republic Pictures Home Video distributed Hallmark Hall of Fame films to home video market. From 1987 to 1992, Hallmark was involved in ownership of the Spanish language Univision broadcast network, along with their owned-and-operated stations. In 1989, it partnered with Jones Intercable to create the Jones Crown Partners partnership, which owned ten Wisconsin cable systems.

In February 1992, Hallmark Cards had formed Signboard Hill Productions as a production company for the Hall of Fame series and other projects for theaters or TV under president Brad Moore. In April 1992 Hallmark Cards purchased RHI Entertainment for $378 million plus $50 million in debt getting a film library with more than 1800 hours of film.

Crown Media Inc. was formed in 1991 by Hallmark as a vehicle for investments into cable operators. The division's CEO James Hoak—a cable television executive who was formerly chairman of Heritage Communications—held a 2% minority stake in the company. Crown initially aimed to serve at least 500,000 customers in three geographic groups by the end of 1994. Crown initially purchased Jones Crown Partners, another system from Jones Intercable, and later St. Louis-based Cencom, which owned systems with 160,000 subscribers, and managed systems with 390,000 subscribers.

With a planned move of Cencom's headquarters to Dallas in January 1993, its top executives left to form Charter Communications. After re-evaluating the business, Hallmark pulled out of cablesystem ownership, and sold its holdings—which served over 800,000 customers—to Charter Communications and Marcus Cable for $900 million.

=== Hallmark Entertainment ===
In 1994, Hallmark brought RHI Entertainment and Signboard Hill Productions under the new division Hallmark Entertainment, under RHI's president and CEO Robert Halmi Jr. In January 1995, Hallmark Entertainment acquired the library of animation studio Filmation from Paravision, and established the home media division Hallmark Home Entertainment. Hallmark also purchased a 9.9% stake in British media company Flextech. It would partner with Hallmark on a proposed pay television service, Hallmark Entertainment Network, which first launched in the Benelux region.

After partnering on the 1996 miniseries Gulliver's Travels, Hallmark Entertainment began a joint venture with The Jim Henson Company to launch Kermit Channel—a chain of family-oriented pay television channels in Asia that would be devoted to carrying the libraries of Jim Henson (including the Muppets franchise) and Hallmark Entertainment, as well as preschool programming provided by Children's Television Workshop.

In 1998, Hallmark Entertainment and Jim Henson acquired major stakes in Odyssey Network, an American religious cable network. Liberty Media, who was a partner in the channel alongside the National Interfaith Cable Coalition, had discouraged Hallmark from attempting to launch a cable network in the U.S. After the purchase, the two companies relaunched the channel in 1999 with a larger focus on family entertainment programming.

=== Crown Media Holdings ===
In 2000, Odyssey's ownership group was re-organized into Crown Media Holdings, with Hallmark, Chase Equity Associates, Liberty Media, and the National Interfaith Cable Coalition transferring their shares in Odyssey to the company, and plans for an IPO. Hallmark received all of Crown Media's class B shares, which were worth ten votes each, thus giving it control of Crown Media. After The Jim Henson Company was sold to German company EM.TV & Merchandising in February 2000, it withdrew from the Kermit Channel partnership with Crown Media, and sold its remaining stake in Odyssey the following month in exchange for 8% of Crown Media's stock.

The company went public in May 2000, selling 10 million shares at $14 per share for about $140 million. Hallmark president and CEO Robert Halmi, Jr. became chairman of Crown Media, and David Evans became president and CEO of Crown Media Holdings. While its channels had 50 million subscribers at the IPO, the company had not turned a profit; Hallmark Entertainment Network lost $35.5 million in 1998 on revenue of $23.7 million, and in 1999 it lost $56.7 million on revenue of $31.9 million. A digital media subsidiary, Crown Interactive, was established in 2001, which attempted to launch a video on-demand platform in Singapore.

In April 2001, Crown Media purchased 700 titles from Hallmark Entertainment Distribution, a subsidiary of Hallmark Entertainment, for its cable channels and Crown Interactive. In payment for the titles, Crown Media took on $220 million in debt and granted over 30 million shares of stock to Hallmark Entertainment. Hallmark's stake in the company was then about 65% of the company's outstanding common stock and completed on October 1, 2001. By late-July 2001, Hallmark acquired the remaining 8% minority stake in Crown Media including Odyssey Network from German company EM.TV & Merchandising and The Jim Henson Company giving Hallmark Entertainment full control of Odyssey Network with the former will license its series from their own library including Henson's library. One month later and after reaching agreements to distribute a religious digital cable network, among other concessions, Odyssey was relaunched by Crown Media as the Hallmark Channel in August 2001, with plans for expansions to original programming. At the end of her contract, Loesch stepped down as the president and CEO of Crown Media US in November 2001.

In January 2004, the company established Hallmark Movie Channel as a sister outlet to Hallmark Channel. The new channel was on track in 2005 to have 9 million subscribers by the end of 2006. In March 2004, Hallmark Entertainment sold the Filmation library to Entertainment Rights for $20 million (£11 million).

In 2005, Hallmark Entertainment put the Hallmark Channel up for sale, but withdrew it from the market after receiving insufficient offers. Losing $233 million in 2005, Hallmark got a tax-sharing agreement allowing Crown's losses to applied against Hallmark Card's gains. Crown Media had $750 million in loans from Hallmark Cards out of a total of $800 million total loans against $1 billion in equity. While minority investors, Liberty Media International Inc. and JPMorgan Chase, might have sold, company management move to clean up the balance sheet and acquire new programming. Hallmark Channels in international markets were sold for about $242 million in 2005 to Sparrowhawk Media, a private equity group backed by Providence Equity Partners and 3i. In December 2005, Crown Media sold off its production arm to an investor group led by RHI founder Robert Halmi Sr. and renamed back to RHI Entertainment. Crown moved to reduce staff by 20% to reduce $13–14 million or more from the balance sheet in 2006. In June 2006, David Evans resigned as CEO then joined RHI as head of global new-media operations and channel. Crown Media had a 3,000-hour library worth $375 million by mid-2006. Crown Media then sold to RHI Enterprises, LLC its media library in November 2006.

In October 2006, Henry Schleiff was hired as CEO from Court TV to prepare it for sale and deal with cable carriage deals expiring (as the channel was at the time in 70 million homes). He would receive a bonus if the channel was sold. Schleiff left as CEO in May 2009. He was replaced by Bill Abbott, previous ad sales head. Crown Media had about $1.1 million in debt thus is attempting to increase revenue and expected to refinance its debt in 2010. Schleiff left to attempt to help other small cable channel to become a major channel like he did with Court TV. He also increase the reach of Hallmark to 86 million homes at the time he left.

Abbott moved most movies to Hallmark Movies while attempt to move to a lifestyle focus similar to such as Scripps Networks Interactive channels. After two content deals for the Hallmark Channel in March 2010, Crown Media and Martha Stewart Living Omnimedia were in discussion about launch a joint venture channel, Hallmark Home. The potential partners were considering bringing in a private equity partner and talk to distributors. Crown Media had placed an animated series based on Hallmark's e-card characters Hoops and Yoyo into development in March 2010. Classic Media took charged of worldwide distribution of the Hoops & Yoyo Ruin Christmas holiday special which is pick up by CBS for a November 2011 debut.

In March 2011, Crown Media renamed its Hallmark Channels unit to Crown Media Networks. Hallmark Movie Channel was re-branded as Hallmark Movies & Mysteries in 2014's fourth quarter. Crown Media Holdings formed Crown Media Productions in March 2015 under programming executive vice president Michelle Vicary to fund six telefilms for 2015 and double that in 2016. In February 2016, Crown Media had taken over ownership of Hallmark Hall of Fame division from Hallmark Cards placing under Crown Media Productions.

On March 9, 2016, Hallmark Cards announced it was buying the remaining less than 10% of Crown Media Holdings traded publicly and taking the company private. Hallmark did so via Delaware's short form merger, which allows a parent company owning over 90% to bypass the subsidiary's board of directors and shareholders in approving the purchase/merger. The privatization was completed later that year.

NBCUniversal agreed to purchased Sparrowhawk Media, international operator of Hallmark Channel, in August 2007. With Hallmark trademark rights reverting in July 2011, Universal Networks International switched over the international Hallmark channels to either Diva Universal, 13th Street Universal, Studio Universal, Universal Channel, or shut them down. In October 2017, Crown Media launched the new channel Hallmark Drama, and the new subscription streaming service Hallmark Movies Now. The company also indicated a publishing division was in the works.

In October 2018, Crown Media announced an output deal with Canadian broadcaster Corus Entertainment for exclusive distribution rights to Hallmark Channel original productions, which would air on its domestic cable channel W Network. The company also partnered with SiriusXM on the satellite radio channel "Hallmark Channel Radio" as a tie-in for that year's "Countdown to Christmas" lineup.

On March 14, 2019, Crown Media announced that it was cutting ties with popular Hallmark Channel actress Lori Loughlin, following her arrest as part of a high-profile federal sting operation relating to college admissions irregularities. In June 2020, after previous CEO Bill Abbott abruptly stepped down in January, Wonya Lucas was named Crown Media's new CEO.

=== Hallmark Media ===
On August 10, 2022, it was announced that Crown Media would be renamed Hallmark Media. In October 2022, Hallmark Media announced a subscription video on demand agreement with NBCUniversal's streaming service Peacock, which saw a Hallmark content hub with live and on-demand content from Hallmark Channel, Hallmark Movies & Mysteries, and Hallmark Drama added to the platform for Premium subscribers.

In July 2024, Hallmark announced that Hallmark Movies Now would rebrand as Hallmark+ in September 2024, with plans for new original series and movies, as well as rewards tied to Hallmark Cards and its retail offerings.

== Units ==
=== Hallmark Home Entertainment ===
Hallmark Home Entertainment was a home video distribution company which was sold to Live Entertainment, a company which was a predecessor of Lionsgate.

Hallmark Home Entertainment was formed by Hallmark Cards in January 1995 to distribute films to the home video market. With Hallmark Hall of Fame and RHI films owned films in home video market deals until 1996 with their primary distributors, Republic Pictures and Cabin Fever Entertainment respectively, the division had to acquire films to distribute from other production companies. The Samuel Goldwyn Company was first to sign with Hallmark Home a four-year deal for new material in January 1995 with expectations to go exclusively with Hallmark as its library rights revert. By June 30, 1995, October Films had also signed a home video distribution deal with the company. Its first two released, Eat Drink Man Woman and David Mamet's Oleanna, were in the week of June 30. 1995. Another Hallmark Card production subsidiary, Signboard Hill Productions, was not expect to have films available to the unit until 1996. Later on, in 1995, Hallmark Home Entertainment launched its own sublabel, which is Evergreen Entertainment. In 1997, Hallmark Home Entertainment worked with Binney & Smith and their board of educators in developing two Crayola branded kids lines, Crayola Kids Adventures, for ages 6 and up, and Crayola Presents Animated Tales, for ages 2 and up, both a series of three direct-to-video adaptations of famous children's novels. In December 1997, Live Entertainment agreed to purchase Hallmark Home Entertainment. Hallmark Home meanwhile completed its purchase of Cabin Fever Entertainment, distributor of RHI films, in March 1998 from UST, Inc., former US Tobacco. Hallmark Home Entertainment, along with Cabin Fever, purchase was completed in 1998.

=== Hallmark Publishing ===
Hallmark Publishing is the publishing division of Crown Media Holdings started in 2017 and is headed by executive editor Stacey Donovan (the legal name of author Bryn Donovan).

The publishing division began releasing ebooks on October 17, 2017, beginning with their telefilm adaptation Journey Back to Christmas. The division also started accepting submissions, which could be adapted into TV films. Starting March 20, 2018, Hallmark Publishing made their book available in trade paperback. On July 26, 2018, at the bi-annual Television Critics Association Summer Press Tour, Crown Media announced its first set of original novels. On January 16, 2019, Hallmark Publishing partnered with Dreamscape Media and began publishing audiobooks. On February 24, 2020, Hallmark Publishing partnered with Walmart on a mass market paperback program. On October 1, 2020, Simon & Schuster became the distributor for eBooks and print editions from Hallmark Publishing. Two Hallmark Publishing books have been adapted into Hallmark movies: The Secret Ingredient by Nancy Naigle, and A Timeless Christmas by Alexis Stanton (original treatment by Stacey Donovan.) In 2019 and 2020, two Hallmark Publishing titles—Wrapped Up in Christmas by Janice Lynn, and Country Hearts by Cindi Madsen—hit the USA Today bestseller list. Christmas Charms by Teri Wilson was named one of the "Best Romance Novels of 2020" by Cosmopolitan magazine.

=== Signboard Hill Productions ===
Signboard Hill Productions, Inc. was a production company owned by Hallmark Entertainment.

The subsidiary was started in February 1992 by Hallmark Cards for the Hall of Fame series and to leverage Hall of Fame production expertise towards additional projects for theaters or TV under president Brad Moore (continuing as division vice president for advertising and television programming) and Hallmark Cards executive vice president Robert L. Stark as Signboard chairman. Richard Welsh Company was retained to assist Signboard Hill in developing projects as it had since 1982 for the Hall of Fame.

With RHI, Signboard co-produced Blind Spot, the 177th Hall of Fame presentation starring Joanne Woodward, to have been shown in 1993. The company started filming its first solo production in June 1993 called Breathing Lessons for the Hall of Fame film in Pittsburgh with James Garner and Joanne Woodward. In July 1993, Signboard Hill Productions signed a production agreement with ABC for 10 two-hour TV movies. These movies would be co-produced with RHI to be broadcast on Saturday evenings during the 1994–95 season.

== Podcasts ==
Crown Media produces podcasts under the brand name of Hallmark Channels’ Official Podcast since 2018.

On December 14, 2018, Hallmark Channels’ Official Podcast were launched with two podcasts subtitled, Countdown to Christmas and Miracles of Christmas. Crown took a fan podcast and made it their third podcast in April 2019.

- Countdown to Christmas (December 14, 2018–) hosted by Debbie Matenopoulos and Cameron Mathison from Home and Family
- Miracles of Christmas (December 14, 2018–) hosted by Brennan Elliott and Nikki DeLoach
- Hallmark Channels’ Bubbly Sesh (April 2019–) a fan podcast started in October 2017 by Jacklyn "Jacks" Collier and Shawlini "Shawl" Manjunath-Holbrook
