= Universal TV (Australian TV channel) =

Australian cable television channel

- Logo used since 2018
- Country: Australia
- Broadcast area: Australia

Programming
- Language: English
- Picture format: 576i (SDTV 16:9); 1080i (HDTV 16:9)

Ownership
- Owner: NBCUniversal International Networks

History
- Launched: 1998 (Australia)
- Former names: Hallmark Channel (1998-2010); Universal Channel (prior to June 2018)

Links
- Website: universaltv.com.au/

Availability

Streaming media
- Foxtel Go: Channel 120
- Fetch Mobi: Channel 102
- Binge: binge.com.au

Universal TV (formerly Hallmark Channel and Universal Channel) is an Australian cable and satellite television channel, owned and operated by NBCUniversal International Networks. It has been available on most subscription television platforms in Australia since 1998.

== History ==
Hallmark Channel logo (1998–2010)

Universal Channel logo used from 1 July 2010 till 31 December 2013

Universal Channel logo used from 2013 to 2018

The channel was added to Austar in April 1999.

On 1 July 2010, the Hallmark Channel rebranded as the Universal Channel. This rebrand saw the slogan In every life there is drama replaced with Characters Welcome as well as the channel converting from 4:3 aspect ratio to 16:9 widescreen picture format. It brought the introduction of new series, including two Australian premiere series, as well as returning to first seasons of almost all programs already aired.

On 1 February 2015, Universal Channel launched on Australian IPTV service Fetch TV.

=== 2014 channel rebranding ===
On 1 January 2014, the Universal Channel rebranded itself alongside other transformations to the Foxtel platform. Among the changes under the rebrand included the channel aligning itself with the international logo and slogan 100% Characters, launching Australian premiere series The Michael J. Fox Show, The Night Shift and the American adaptation of Rake and inherited series from the closure of TV1 including 30 Rock, Covert Affairs, Suits, Law & Order: Special Victims Unit and Law & Order: Criminal Intent. In addition to the closure of TV1, this influx of programming was attributed to the end of the output agreement between NBCUniversal and Seven Network in mid 2013, allowing for more programming opportunities for Universal Channel.

Additionally, Universal Channel moved to the basic tier of the Foxtel platform, as opposed to its previous placement in a premium package, allowing all subscribers to access the channel. Also, a two-hour timeshift channel launched on channel 162.

As for the films broadcast on the channel, the channel not only airs films from Universal Pictures, but also airs films from other distributors such as Paramount Pictures, DreamWorks Pictures, and Miramax Films.

=== Universal Channel HD ===
On 3 November 2014, Universal Channel launched a HD simulcast on Foxtel. In addition, it moved from channel 116 to channel 112 and Universal Channel + 2 moved from channel 162 to channel 155.

On 14 February 2017, Universal Channel was made available in HD for Fetch TV customers.

On 1 June 2018, Universal Channel became Universal TV.

== Programming ==
Universal TV currently airs a variety of international programs, including:

- 30 Rock
- Brothers & Sisters
- Castle
- Chicago P.D.
- Covert Affairs
- Gracepoint
- Fact or Faked: Paranormal Files
- Flashpoint
- Harry's Law
- Hawthorne
- House
- Justice
- Legend Quest
- Law & Order: Criminal Intent
- Law & Order: Special Victims Unit
- Law & Order: UK (seasons 4 and 5 only, seasons 1–3 shown on 13th Street)
- The Librarians
- Life
- Lipstick Jungle
- Mercy
- The Michael J. Fox Show
- Monroe
- My Boys
- The Night Shift
- Parenthood
- Perception
- Private Practice
- Psych
- Rake
- Rookie Blue
- Single Father
- Strange
- The Starter Wife
- Suits
- White Heat

=== Former programming ===
Prior to the 2014 format, the channel aired content from the original American Hallmark Channel, selected telemovies from the United States and United Kingdom, along with classic and contemporary Australian drama series from Southern Star Entertainment.

A list of Australian produced shows broadcast on Universal TV prior to the 2014 format include:

- A Country Practice
- All Saints (moved to 111)
- Always Greener
- Blue Heelers
- City Homicide
- The Librarians
- McLeod's Daughters
- Offspring
- Packed to the Rafters (moved to 111)
- Police Rescue
- Rake
- Rescue: Special Ops
- Rush
- SeaChange
- Sea Patrol
- Stingers
- The Secret Life of Us
- Water Rats

== Availability ==
Universal TV is part of most satellite and cablepay television providers in Australia, usually included in an extra or add-on package. Providers include Foxtel, Fetch TV, Optus TV.

== Ratings ==
Universal TV's ratings have increased from a 0.3% share in April 2007, to a 0.5% share in January 2010 (before the channel's re-branding). This is an 0.2% increase in almost 3 years.

== See also ==
- Universal Channel
- Universal TV (New Zealand)
- 13th Street
- Hallmark Channel (International)
- Universal Networks International
