= Hallmark Channel (international) =

Television channel

- Formerly: Hallmark Entertainment Network, Inc.
- Type: Private company
- Founded: 1995; 31 years ago
- Fate: Merged out
- Successor: Universal Networks International
- Products: Cable channel
- Brands: Diva TV; Hallmark Channel; Kermit Channel; Movies 24
- Owners: Providence Equity Partners; 3i; David Elstein (2005–2007)
- Parent: Hallmark Entertainment (1995–2000); Crown Media Holdings (2000–2005)
- Subsidiaries: KidsCo (Joint venture)

Ownership
- Sister channels: Diva TV; Kermit Channel (1998–2002); KidsCo (2009–2011); Movies 24 (2009–2011); CNBC International (2007–2011); Sci Fi Channel (2007–2011)

History
- Launched: June 1995; 31 years ago
- Closed: July 2011; 15 years ago
- Replaced by: 13th Street Universal; Diva Universal; Universal Channel; Studio Universal
- Former names: Hallmark Entertainment Network (1995–2001)
- Website: www.hallmarkchannelint.com

Hallmark Channel, formerly Hallmark Entertainment Network, in international markets was owned by several media companies. Over their history, the various channels were operated by Hallmark Entertainment Networks, Inc. (1995–2005), Sparrowhawk Media, Limited (2005–2007) and Universal Networks International (2007–2011). Universal Networks International rebranded or discontinued the channels by July 2011. Hallmark Entertainment Networks, Inc. was owned by Crown Media Holdings, Inc. Sparrowhawk Media was owned by venture capital companies and Universal Networks International is owned by NBCUniversal.

== History ==
=== Hallmark Entertainment Network ===
Crown Media thus shifted directions in 1994 with the sale of the cable systems. Also that year, Hallmark Cards purchased RHI Entertainment for $365 million getting a 1,800 plus hours film library then formed Hallmark Entertainment as RHI's parent corporation. Hallmark Entertainment then formed Hallmark Entertainment Network, Inc. in mid-1995 to start the Hallmark Entertainment Network (HEN) pay TV channel in Belgium, the Netherlands and Luxembourg. The company waited to start a domestic channel due to lack of carriage space and its programming domestic rights were held by others. The Benelux channel launched in June 1995.

Hallmark Entertainment and The Jim Henson Company started a partnership in May 1998 to launch the Kermit Channel in Asia and Latin America expect to start in September 1998 with distribution handled by Hallmark Entertainment Network. The HEN channels had internationally about six million subscribers at this time.

Crown Media was reformed into Crown Media Holdings, Inc. in 2000 as part of a re-organizational plan that included the company going public. Crown Media Holdings was formed as a subsidiary of Hallmark Entertainment (Hallmark). Hallmark transferred Hallmark Entertainment Network, Inc. and its interest in the Odyssey Network into Crown Media Holdings. While its channels had 50 million subscribers at the IPO, the company had not made a profit yet with Hallmark Entertainment Network, Inc. losing $35.5 million in 1998 on revenue of $23.7 million, and in 1999 it lost $56.7 million on revenue of $31.9 million.

EM.TV had Henson Company withdrawal from the Kermit Channel partnership with Crown Media. In November 2001, Kermit Channel Asia except for in India was shut down while Kermit blocks remained on the Asian HEN. The channel was discontinued in India in December 2001.

When Crown took control of and renamed the Odyssey Network channel to the Hallmark Channel in August 2001 with plans to quickly add original programming, the international Hallmark Entertainment Network soon did the same.

=== Sparrowhawk Media ===
In 2005, Hallmark Entertainment put the Hallmark Channels up for sale, but with disappointing offers with drew the channels from the market. The European media library rights and Hallmark Channels in international markets were sold for about $242 million in 2005 to Sparrowhawk Media, a private group backed by Providence Equity Partners and 3i and also owned by David Elstein. NBC Universal soon became the channels' major supplier.

On July 1, 2006, Sparrowhawk Media launched Movies 24 free to air film channel on Sky with Dolphin Television as the ad sales company, followed by its two-hour time shift More 24 on October 16, 2006. The company, Corus Entertainment and DIC Entertainment announced in early April 2007 for a joint venture children's TV channel, KidsCo.

NBC Universal agreed to purchased Sparrowhawk Media, international operator of Hallmark Channel, in August 2007. There were 18 Hallmark Channels at this time. The company had on its immediate schedule plans to launch KidsCo in September and Diva TV channel in the UK in October 23 with Movie24 Plus. Sparrowhawk was merged into NBCU's global networks division.

In July 2011, Universal Networks International's rights to the Hallmark Channel brand ended; the networks were either shut down, or rebranded as Diva Universal, Studio Universal, 13th Street Universal or Universal Channel.

=== Canadian content deal ===
In October 2018, the Canadian women's entertainment channel W Network (owned by Corus Entertainment) announced that it had acquired exclusive rights to Hallmark Channel's original programming library, beginning in November for the Countdown to Christmas event. Hallmark Channel content and localised versions of its seasonal programming blocks will be aired alongside W Network's existing programming. Hallmark Channel films and series were previously acquired individually by W and other Canadian channels; much of this programming is filmed in Canada.

== Hallmark channels ==
Market	Hallmark Channel rebranding or launch	Replacement brand/channel	Replaced date
Benelux (Belgium, the Netherlands, Luxembourg)	June 1995	discontinued	July 20, 2011
Latin America	September 12, 1995	Studio Universal	February 1, 2010
Africa	October 6, 1995	Universal Channel	March 24, 2010
Scandinavia (timeshared with Fox Kids/Jetix)	March 1, 1996	Disney XD	August 31, 2009
Baltics	March 1, 1996	TV3 Baltic	August 31, 2009
Middle East and North Africa	March 1996	KidsCo	August 31, 2009
Italy	September 1, 1997	Diva Universal	April 1, 2011
Asia	November 30, 1997	Diva Universal	September 19, 2010
Spain	December 15, 1997	discontinued	April 1, 2005
Romania	April 1, 1998	Diva Universal	October 3, 2010
Poland	April 1, 1998	13th Street Universal	September 13, 2010
Hungary	April 1, 1998	Universal Channel	September 3, 2010
Czech Republic, Slovakia	April 1, 1998	Universal Channel	September 3, 2010
Australia	April 1999	Universal Channel	July 1, 2010
Russia	April 19, 1999	Diva Universal	September 17, 2010
United Kingdom	February 2000	Universal Channel	October 18, 2010
United Kingdom	HD: June 28, 2010	Universal Channel	October 18, 2010
Turkey	2000	Universal Channel	December 17, 2009
Israel	July 2000	Universal Channel	December 28, 2009
Croatia, Bosnia-Herzegovina, Montenegro	August 1, 2001	Universal Channel	September 3, 2010

== Other channels ==
Channel	Market	Air date	Replacement brand/channel	Replaced date
Kermit	Asia	September 1998	discontinued	December 2002
Kermit	Latin America	September 1998	discontinued	
Movies 24	UK	July 1, 2006		
More 24	UK	October 16, 2006		
Xmas Movies (ITVX)	UK	November 2022-present (Only at Christmas time)		

== See also ==
- List of Hallmark Channel Original Movies
