= Universal TV (New Zealand) =

- Country: New Zealand
- Broadcast area: New Zealand

Programming
- Language: English
- Picture format: 1080i (HDTV 16:9)

Ownership
- Owner: NBCUniversal International Networks
- Sister channels: Bravo

History
- Launched: 30 April 2021; 4 years ago

Links
- Website: sky.co.nz/universal-tv

Availability

Streaming media
- Sky Go: skygo.co.nz

Universal TV is a television channel in New Zealand available on Sky. The channel is dedicated to international crime and drama procedural programing.

== History ==
On 6 April 2021, Sky announced it had signed an extensive multi-year deal with NBCUniversal to launch a New Zealand version of Universal TV.

The channel launched on 30 April 2021 at 6:00am on Sky Channel 210. The first program to air on the channel was Monk.

== Programming ==
Universal TV currently airs a variety of international programs, including:

- Chicago P.D.
- Chicago Fire
- Chicago Med
- House
- Law & Order: Criminal Intent
- Law & Order: Special Victims Unit
- Monk

== See also ==
- Universal TV
- Universal Networks International
