= MTV Africa =

African version of MTV

- Final logo, used from 14 September 2021 to 1 January 2026
- Broadcast area: Sub-Saharan Africa

Programming
- Language: English
- Picture format: 1080i HDTV (downscaled to 16:9 576i for the SDTV feed)

Ownership
- Owner: Paramount Networks EMEAA
- Sister channels: BET Africa; Comedy Central Africa; Nickelodeon Africa; Nicktoons Africa Nick Jr. Africa

History
- Launched: 3 July 2013; 13 years ago
- Replaced: MTV Europe (African feed)
- Closed: 1 January 2026; 9 months ago

Links
- Website: Official website

MTV Africa, formerly MTV South Africa, was an African pay television channel founded by Alex Okosi, Jandre Louw, Dudu Qubu and Maya Padmore and launched as 'Africas MTV'. The African equivalent of the eponymous American cable channel and owned by Paramount Networks EMEAA, it broadcast locally produced reality series and MTV US content.

== History ==
- 1995 – Pan-African satellite provider DStv launched 17 international channels on its service, including MTV Europe and VH1 Europe. These channels were the major promoters of international genres of music to the continent.
- 2004 – MTV Networks International announced it had plans to launch its 100th channel in Africa with the launch of MTV Africa (proposed branding). In February 2005, MTV Networks International launched MTV Base Africa. The channel was launched with a live music special with performances from local African and international artists. MTV Base Africa also promoted MTV Europe and aired some of its reality-based programmes.
- 2012 – MTV Base and its other sister channels increased its promotion of MTV (which had already started airing less of music and more of reality shows) by airing its promos and also opened a Facebook and Twitter page named MTVONDSTV.
- 2013 – In June, MTV Base divided itself into two feeds, one exclusively for South Africa and the other airing for the rest of the continent. While MTV was going to get a localised feed exclusively for South Africa, the rest of the continent would have been served by the European feed. However, MTV South Africa was also launched across East and West Africa and replaced MTV Europe. Despite its coverage area, the channel was only focused towards its Southern African viewers. It aired shows from MTV US, music programming and two local shows, MTV choice, which was a magazine show, and Jou Ma Se MTV, which was a playlist of South African music videos. The channel also launched a website, mtv.co.za to follow it and its social pages was changed from MTVONDSTV to MTVZA.
- 2015 – MTV reduced its music airing time to 02:00 CAT to 06:00 CAT instead of 02:00 CAT to 09:00 CAT and music was no longer aired at noon. MTV South Africa rebranded to MTV Africa and its name on its social pages was changed to MTVAFRICA. The website which still has the South African domain ".za" is still used. Another local show named MTV #YouGotGot, which featured a team of South African pranksters tricking people and celebrities, was premiered.
- 2019 – VH1 Classic rebranded into MTV Music 24 in SD with MTV, Comedy Central, BET, Nickelodeon (South Africa) and MTV Base are now available in HD.
- 2026 – Closed along with BET Africa, MTV Base Africa,CBS Justice, CBS Reality, MTV 80s, MTV 90s, MTV 00s, Club MTV, MTV Live, MTV Music as a part of resturcturing of Paramount Global into Paramount Skydance

== Availability ==
MTV Africa was available in Sub-Saharan Africa exclusively through DStv. It was available in Southern Africa through the Compact, Extra and Premium bouquets while in the rest of Africa on Compact, Compact + and Premium and could be accessed in two million households in the region. The channel was originally available exclusively on DStv Premium following MTV Europe.

== Logos ==
Logo used as MTV Europe from 1 August 1987 to 1 July 2011.

Logo used as MTV Europe from 1 July 2011 until launch of localized feed which is currently used until September 2021.

Logo used as MTV Africa from 14 September 2021 to 1 January 2026.

Primary logo used as MTV Africa from 14 September 2021 to 1 January 2026.

== Shows ==
- Have Faith
- 16 and Pregnant
- Are You the One?
- Awkward
- Catfish: The TV Show
- The Challenge
- Deliciousness
- Ex on the Beach
- Faking It
- Fired by Mom and Dad
- Geordie Shore
- Ghosted: Love Gone Missing
- Girl Code
- Guy Code
- The Hills
- Jersey Shore
- Lip Sync Battle
- Lip Sync Battle Africa
- Love & Hip Hop: Miami
- MTV#YouGotGot
- MTV News
- MTV's Bugging Out
- Pimp My Ride
- The Real World
- Ridiculousness
- Ridiculousness Africa
- Sleeping in the Family
- Teen Mom
- Teen Mom 2
- This Model Life
- Wild 'n Out
- Shuga

Award shows and live music specials

- BET Awards
- BET Hip Hop Awards
- Isle of MTV
- MTV Africa Music Awards
- MTV Europe Music Awards
- MTV Movie Awards
- MTV Video Music Awards
- MTV World Stage
- Nickelodeon Kids' Choice Awards

== See also ==
- MTV Base Africa
- MTV Portugal
- MTV France
- MTV Rocks
- Club MTV
- MTV Hits
