= Syfy (Asia) =

Asian cable TV channel

Syfy Universal / Syfy (Asia)
- Syfy logo
- Country: Singapore
- Broadcast area: Singapore; Taiwan; Hong Kong; Malaysia; Philippines; Thailand; Indonesia
- Network: NBCUniversal International Networks
- Headquarters: Singapore

Programming
- Picture format: 480i (SDTV) 16:9; 1080i (HDTV)

Ownership
- Owner: NBCUniversal
- Sister channels: CNBC Asia; DIVA; E! Golf Channel; Universal Channel; DreamWorks Channel; Euronews

History
- Launched: July 1, 2008; 18 years ago
- Closed: June 30, 2017; 9 years ago (Malaysia); July 1, 2017; 9 years ago (Rest of Asia)
- Former names: Sci Fi Channel (2008-2010); Syfy Universal (2010-2012)

Links
- Website: Wayback Machine

Syfy Universal Asia (sometimes referred to as Syfy Asia) was an Asian cable television channel, launched on 1 July 2008, which mainly airs science fiction, fantasy and horror programs and movies. It also airs anime programming. It is owned by Universal Networks International.

The channel rebranded as Syfy Universal on 26 July 2010. On 7 February 2012, Syfy Universal's name was simplified to Syfy as well as converting from 4:3 aspect ratio to 16:9 widescreen picture format since 1 April 2011. The channel delivers Same Day or Express from the U. S. telecast with selected programs.

After 9 years of broadcasting, Syfy along with Universal Channel officially ceased transmission at midnight, 1 July 2017, in the rest of the Asia and in Malaysia was discontinued a day earlier. The channel aired a final Syfy Original Movie, Ozark Sharks on that day, ending with production credits before the channel went off-the-air.

== Operating channels ==
- Syfy Asia - SIN/HK/MY/PH/THAI/JKT feed; available on HD format in selected Asian countries apply.
- Syfy Taiwan - Same with the Asian feed but with Chinese subtitles; available in HD format.

== Programming ==
=== Final Shows ===
- Continuum
- Fact or Faked: Paranormal Files
- Haibane Renmei
- Haunted Collector
- Haven
- Paranormal Witness
- RocketJump: The Show
- Supernatural
- The Paranormal Zone
- The R.I.P Files
- Z Nation

=== Former Shows ===
- A Haunting
- Air
- Alphas
- Andromeda
- The Andromeda Strain
- Angel
- Attack of the Show!
- Babylon 5
- Battlestar Galactica
- Being Human
- Bionic Woman
- Black Lagoon
- Blade: The Series
- Dark Matter
- Dead Like Me
- The Dead Zone
- Defiance
- Destination Truth
- Dominion
- Ergo Proxy
- Escape Or Die!
- Eureka
- Face Off
- Farscape
- Firefly
- First Wave
- Ghost Mine
- Ghost Whisperer
- Halcyon
- Haunted Case Files
- Haunted Highway
- The Haunting Hour
- Heroes of Cosplay
- Heroes
- Incorporated
- Jeremiah
- Kyle XY
- Legend of the Seeker
- Legend Quest
- Marcel's Quantum Kitchen
- Medium
- Merlin
- Mutant X
- The New Addams Family
- Nyan Koi!
- The Outer Limits
- Paranormal Survivor
- Quantum Leap
- Riese: Kingdom Falling
- Sanctuary
- Samurai Girl
- Scariest Places on Earth
- Serial Experiments Lain
- Sliders
- Star Trek: The Next Generation
- Stargate Atlantis
- Stargate SG-1
- Stargate Universe
- Smallville
- Stan Lee's Lucky Man
- Stranded
- Supernatural: The Animation
- Town of the Living Dead
- Tru Calling
- The Twilight Zone
- Warehouse 13
- Web Soup
- Xena: Warrior Princess

Sci Fi logo used from July 1, 2008, to July 25, 2010

=== Syfy Kids ===
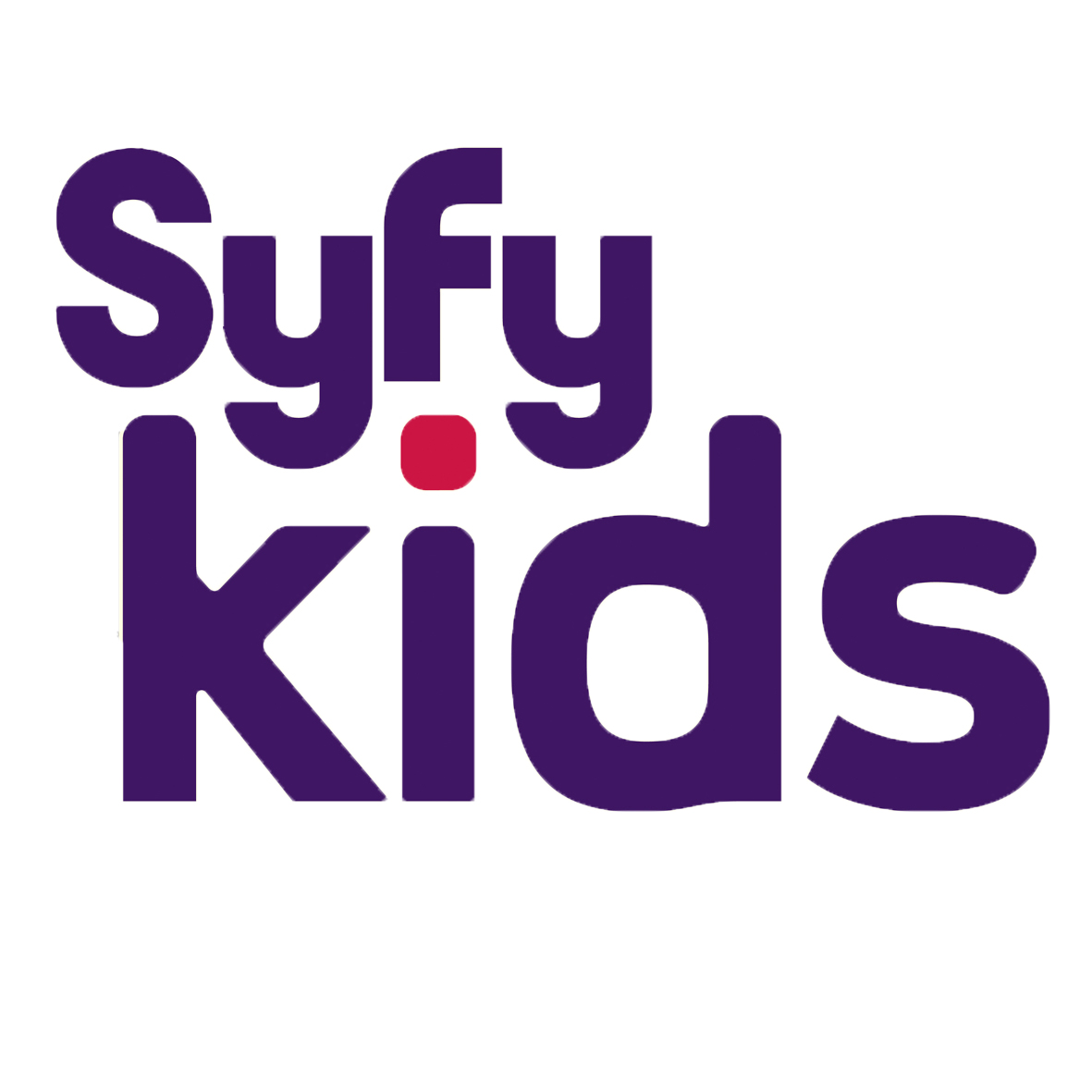
Syfy Kids

Syfy Kids was a programming block on KidsCo, in which both of them shut down in favor of Sprout, which is now Universal Kids. The block was launched in February 2013, and was shut down in December of that same year.

- Back to the Future
- Matt Hatter Chronicles
- The Future Is Wild
- The Mummy
- Z-Squad
- Zuzu & the Supernuffs

=== Movie block ===
- Mockbuster Mayhem
- Syfy Movies

== See also ==
- Syfy Universal in various countries
- SF Channel
