= Nick Jr. (Sub-Saharan Africa) =

- Country: South Africa
- Broadcast area: Sub-Saharan Africa
- Headquarters: Johannesburg, South Africa

Programming
- Languages: English; Amharic

Ownership
- Owner: Paramount Networks EMEAA Multichoice
- Parent: Nickelodeon Group
- Sister channels: Nickelodeon; Nicktoons; MTV; BET Africa; Comedy Central Africa

History
- Launched: 30 September 2014; 12 years ago

Links
- Website: Official website

Availability

Terrestrial
- DStv: Channel 307
- GOtv: Channel 81

Nick Jr. is a South African pay television channel owned by Paramount Networks EMEAA. It launched on 30 September 2014 along with sister channel Nicktoons. North Africa receives Nick Jr. MENA, an Arabic language version of the channel.

Unlike other feeds, the end credits on shows are replaced with short credits including the show name, production year and production company while promos and bumpers do not contain any text other than the Nick Jr. logo.

== History ==
Before its launch, all Nick Jr. programming was broadcast on Nickelodeon.

A Nick Jr. block began airing every morning on Nicktoons in 2017. The channel also has an Ethiopian feed Amharic language available on DStv channel 312 on Sub-Saharan Africa region.
