= Movies 24 =

- Country: United Kingdom
- Broadcast area: United Kingdom; Ireland

Programming
- Timeshift service: Movies 24+

Ownership
- Owner: Sky UK
- Sister channels: List: Challenge CNBC Europe Sky Mix Sky Arts Sky Atlantic Sky Cinema Sky Comedy Sky Crime Sky Documentaries Sky History Sky History 2 Sky Nature Sky News Sky One Sky Sports Sky Sports Box Office Sky Sports F1 Sky Sports News Sky Sports Racing Sky Witness Sky Sci-Fi

History
- Launched: 26 June 2006

Links
- Website: www.tvmovies24.com

Movies 24 is a British pay television channel owned and operated by Sky Group. Launched on 26 June 2006, the channel primarily airs television films and shows originally broadcast on the Hallmark Channel.

For a full quarter of each year (October to December), the channel undergoes a seasonal rebranding as Christmas 24 and Christmas 24+, offering a lineup of festive films beyond just the Christmas season.

== History ==
The channel was launched in the United Kingdom on 26 June 2006 on the satellite provider Sky. On 16 October 2006, a timeshift channel Movies 24+ was launched. The channel was previously a 90-minute timeshift channel called More 24.

In September 2007, Movies 24+ introduced a separate daily schedule from Movies 24, showing the same movies but at different times throughout the day. From 1 April 2020, Movies 24 is not available on the BT TV platform.

On 23 February 2022, Movies 24 was integrated into Sky's family of channels following Comcast's acquisition of Sky Group in 2018.

As of 1 April 2022, the Movies 24 website is no longer in operation.

From 2025, Hallmark Original movies now premiere on Sky Cinema instead.

== Programming ==
Hallmark Channel Original Movies are a main feature of programing.

The channel is well known for its seasonal themed programming, such as Autumn, Hallowe'en, at Christmas, Valentine's Day and Mother's Day, which are broadcast throughout the year. Other movies and tv shows featured can focus on other themes such as Westerns.

Much of the programming on Movies 24 includes:

- Be My Valentine
- Chesapeake Shores
- The Seven Year Hitch
- Letter Never Sent
- Rescuing Madison
- When Duty Calls
- Change of Heart
- Autumn Dreams
- A Kind of Magic
- I Think I Do
- Harvest Moon
- Double Platinum
- The Good Witch
