= KidsCo =

Former international children's television channel

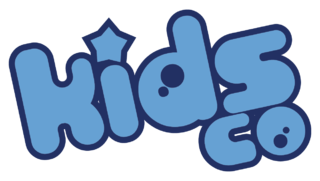
- Channel's logo from 2012 until its closure.
- Country: United Kingdom
- Broadcast area: Europe, Asia, Africa, Australia
- Headquarters: London, United Kingdom

Programming
- Language: Various
- Picture format: 480i (SDTV); 576i (SDTV)

Ownership
- Owner: NBCUniversal (33%, 2007-2012; 51%, 2012-2014); Corus Entertainment 33%, 2007-2012; 43.8%, 2012-2014); DIC Entertainment (33%) (2007-2008); Cookie Jar Group (33%) (2008-2012)

History
- Founded: April 2007
- Launched: September 7, 2007 (Central and Eastern Europe); January 8, 2008 (Asia, South Africa, Middle East); April 10, 2008 (Africa); May 9, 2008 (Spain); May 12, 2008 (Hong Kong); November 15, 2009 (Australia); November 27, 2009 (Greece); May 1, 2010 (South Africa)
- Closed: May 5, 2013 (Poland); June 30, 2013 (Austria); December 31, 2013 (rest of Europe); February 14, 2014 (remaining territories)

Links
- Website: kidscotv.tv

KidsCo was an international children's television channel active from 2007 until 2014. It was a joint venture between Corus Entertainment, DIC Entertainment (later part of Cookie Jar Group) and NBCUniversal whose content was mainly commissioned by DIC and Corus subsidiary Nelvana. At its peak in 2011, it was available in at least 95 countries in 18 languages.

In early 2014, it was shut down by its owners, in light of NBCUniversal's acquisition of U.S. children's network Sprout and "growing challenges in the international children's television industry". The network was based in London at the time of its closure.

== History ==
Original logo used from 2007 to 2012

On 22 June 2006, British children's television company HIT Entertainment announced plans to launch a pan-European children's television network with Sparrowhawk Media Group, the owners of the international versions of the Hallmark Channel, within 18 months. These plans never came through, with the company instead partnering with rival Chellomedia to acquire Italian children's network JimJam and expand its operations globally.

In 2007, former BBC Radio 1 controller Paul Robinson cited an increasing focus on older "tween" audiences and increasing vertical integration by mainstream counterparts Disney Channel, Cartoon Network and Nickelodeon, in addition to the need to reduce costs for other content producers by not adopting a traditional license fee deal.On April 4, 2007, Sparrowhawk Media officially announced a joint venture with Canadian media company Corus Entertainment (the owner of Nelvana) and American animation studio DIC Entertainment entitled KidsCo. KidsCo would consist of a television network with a programming library containing over 3,000" half-hour episodes each of DIC and Nelvana content, and broadcast facilities provided by Sparrowhawk in the United States. The network was effectively a startup, as it depended on funding from all three partners in the venture, with Paul Robinson as KidsCo's CEO.

The channel was first launched in Central and Eastern Europe on September 7, 2007, and subsequently expanded to other Asia-Pacific and EMEA markets in the coming years. Although numerous claims had been made of an imminent UK launch throughout its existence, the channel struggled to establish an official foothold there because market conditions at the time meant a launch would not be commercially viable. Plans had also been discussed for a potential expansion throughout France, Germany, Italy and Latin America, but these did not transpire. Robinson served as managing director of the network through 2011, after which he was succeeded by Hendrik McDermott.

Later in 2007, Sparrowhawk Media was purchased by media conglomerate NBCUniversal, while DIC was merged into Cookie Jar Group the following year. This led to additional shows being added to the network, and Universal taking over operations.

In May 2012, NBCUniversal and Corus acquired Cookie Jar's stake in KidsCo, which saw the former obtain a controlling 51% stake while the latter increased its share to 43.8%. Cookie Jar would continue to be a broadcast partner and programme supplier for the network.

On January 8, 2013, KidsCo moved its broadcasting facilities to Corus Quay in Toronto, while also introducing a refreshed schedule, on-air look and website. In February 2013, as part of a joint venture with the NBC-affiliated Syfy network, it debuted a new programming block titled Syfy Kids.

=== Closure ===
Throughout 2012 and 2013, Comcast had fully acquired the PBS Kids Sprout cable network from its broadcast partners and put a major focus on its operations. Alongside this, KidsCo had also been struggling to compete with larger rivals across the world; as such, NBCUniversal and Corus announced on November 18, 2013 that the KidsCo joint venture would end and the channel would cease operations, as would the Syfy Kids strand. KidsCo's European feeds ceased broadcasting on December 31, 2013, with the remaining feeds for Malaysia on February 10, 2014 and Asia, Australia and Sub-Saharan Africa following suit on Valentine's Day 2014.

== Availability ==
On January 1, 2008, KidsCo launched in the Philippines on SkyCable and on Showtime Arabia on March 20, 2008. In the first trimester of 2009 the channel was launched in Portugal on Optimus Clix. The channel become available also on Vodafone Casa TV platform on July 25, 2010.

On November 15, 2009, KidsCo launched on Australian platform Foxtel. That same month, it launched in Greece on Conn-x TV and in Cyprus on CytaVision. In November 2010 it additionally launched on IPTV in Greece. It launched on South African platforms TopTV on May 1, 2010 and DStv on July 12, 2010.

On June 23, 2012, KidsCo also launched on HyppTV platform.

On March 1, 2013, as part of the channel renumbering, KidsCo has moved to Channel 560.

KidsCo ceased broadcasting in Poland on May 5, 2013, having previously been removed from some Polish cable networks on April 30. It was removed from the AustriaSat platform on June 30, 2013.

In early 2013, KidsCo underwent a major operational overhaul, moving its master control and broadcasting facilities to Corus Entertainment's headquarters at Corus Quay in Toronto.

On VOO, the channel was replaced by Piwi+ after its closure in 2014.

== See also ==
- Qubo - A former U.S. children's programming block and digital multicast network that ran from 2006 to 2021, stemming from a separate joint venture that also involved NBCUniversal and Corus Entertainment, while also including Ion Media Networks (which took full ownership of the brand in 2013), Scholastic, and Classic Media.
