= Shattered (Canadian TV series) =

Canadian television series

- promotional poster
- Starring: Callum Keith Rennie
- Country of origin: Canada
- No. of seasons: 1
- No. of episodes: 13 + pilot

Production
- Executive producers: Laszlo Barna; Debra Beard; Noreen Halpern; Jeff King; John Morayniss
- Running time: 44 minutes
- Production companies: E1 Television; Shaw Media; Force Four Films; Universal Networks International

Original release
- Network: Showcase; Global
- Release: September 1 – November 17, 2010

Shattered is a Canadian police procedural series created by Rick Drew. The main character (played by Callum Keith Rennie) is a tough, smart homicide detective in Vancouver with dissociative identity disorder, formerly known as multiple personality disorder.

His wife Ella is played by Molly Parker. In the first moments of the series, Ben is bonded in blood to his determined, beautiful partner Amy Lynch. While they work to solve the murder cases that cross their desk daily, Ben copes with the fascinating complexities of his secret disorder, and the uncertainty of never knowing which alternate personality will surface, or when. Other regular characters of the series are Sergeant Pam ‘TC’ Garrett, John ‘Hall’ Holland a young, handsome and ambitious detective, and Terry Rhodes, Ben's best friend and ex-partner.

== Plot ==
In an interview with Rennie in 2008, the show's plot was described as a police procedural drama, following the adventures of an ex-cop, Kyle Loggins, traumatized by the murder of his family. According to this interview and press releases, the trauma triggered a dissociative identity disorder, wherein the victim manifests multiple personalities. In the pilot, Kyle's personalities include Jack, his brash alpha-male alter ego; Hal, the teenage nerd who personifies Kyle's analytical and introverted side; and Tyler, the quiet little boy who surfaces when he is at his most vulnerable. Kyle teams up with rookie policewoman Madeline Maguire who exploits Kyle's unique investigative abilities.

== Production ==
The pilot for the series was shot in November 2008. The series was picked up for 13 one-hour episodes in April 2009. According to new press releases, the plot for the actual series differs from the one for the pilot.

== Cast ==
- Callum Keith Rennie as Ben Sullivan
- Molly Parker as Ella Sullivan
- Camille Sullivan as Amy Lynch
- Karen LeBlanc as Sergeant Pam "TC" Garrett
- Clé Bennett as John "Hall" Holland
- Chad Rook as Patrick Michaels
- Martin Cummins as Terry Rhodes
- Brian Markinson as Dr. Ryan Disilvio
- Michael Eklund as Nick Ducet

Pilot

- Kyle Loggins: Callum Keith Rennie
- Det. Madeline Maguire: Laura Jordan
- Jack: Colin Cunningham
- Det. Bruce Catelli: John Cassini
- Inspector Roscoe: Brian Markinson
- Hal: Chad Krowchuk
- Tyler: Quinn Lord
- Dr. Lynn Tanninger: Gabrielle Rose
- Nora: Michele Lonsdale Smith
- Raveena Sood: Daesha Danielle Usman
- Amita Sandhu: Rekha Sharma
- Hostess (as Julia Anderson): Julia Benson
- Oliver Quinn: Ian Tracey
- Akbar Sood: Sugith Varughese
- Bouncer: Viv Leacock

== Episodes ==
When initially broadcast, new episodes of Shattered would premiere at 9:00 pm on cable channel Showcase and then repeat at 10:00 pm on broadcast network Global. Only 10 episode were shown in Canada during the first run of the show and they were broadcast out of order based on the "previously on" segments at the beginning of each episode. Among repeats in late 2010 and early 2011 the three episodes skipped in the first run are being shown on Showcase. Shattered is also being shown on TAC, a Canadian cable channel which shows programming with Described Video for the visually impaired. The Universal Channel in the UK will air all 13 episodes. The Canadian viewer data is for the broadcasts on Global.

No.	Title	Directed by	Written by	Original release date	Canada viewers (millions)
0	Pilot	Bobby Roth	Rick Drew	February 24, 2011	N/A
1	"The Sins of the Father"	Kari Skogland	Frank Borg	September 1, 2010	0.428
Ben Sullivan, a smart, tough homicide detective who suffers from Multiple Personality Disorder, unwittingly drags his new partner into a clouded murder investigation.
2	"Harry has a Wife?"	Stephen Surjik	David Shmidt	September 8, 2010	0.375
Ben struggles to keep his alternate personalities in check while investigating the violent death of a prominent Chinese doctor who may have ties to a notorious drug dealer.
3	"Sound of a Strap"	Rick Rosenthal	Shernold Edwards	September 29, 2010	N/A
Ben and Lynch investigate the multiple homicide of a group of teenagers that appears to be gang-related. There is a witness, but she’s not talking.
4	"Tears Bring Harry"	Patrick Williams	Greg Spottiswood	October 6, 2010	0.284
Ben Sullivan and Amy Lynch are assigned to the murder of an attractive woman, shot dead at close range, and their investigation reveals that she had ties to an escort service.
5	"Don't Wanna Die"	Kari Skogland	Greg Spottiswood	September 22, 2010	0.423
A recent explosion at an engineering firm may be connected to other bombings up the coast, and the detectives are called in to support the feds’ investigation.
6	"She Had You Fooled"	Rick Rosenthal	Adam Barken	December 31, 2010	N/A
A woman’s body, with multiple stab wounds, wrapped in plastic, is found floating in the ocean. The extent of her injuries suggests a rage killing, making it very likely that the victim knew her attacker.
7	"Where's the Line"	Stephen Surjik	Greg Spottiswood	October 13, 2010	0.273
Detectives Sullivan and Lynch go undercover to an after hours nightclub when the heist of a high-stakes poker game ups the ante, leaving one gunman dead and the other missing.
8	"Everyone's a Hostage to Someone"	Patrick Williams	Frank Borg	October 27, 2010	0.431
While two prisoners are being transferred to the city jail, one of them manages to get hold of an officer’s gun and creates a dangerous standoff with the Homicide detectives.
9	"In the Dark"	Helen Shaver	Jennica Harper	November 3, 2010	0.245
A brutal sexual assault and murder has eerily similar characteristics to an earlier unsolved case Lynch worked on, and she is convinced she knows who the killer is.
10	"Key with no Lock"	Patrick Williams	David Schmidt	January 28, 2011	N/A
A 14-year-old girl discovers her mother, brutally murdered, and Ben Sullivan suspects her estranged older brother may have had something to do with it.
11	"Finding the Boy"	Patrick Williams	Rick Drew	February 4, 2011	N/A
A Punjabi wedding celebration comes to a murderous close when two professional hit men open fire on the groom and guests, then abduct the couple’s baby.
12	"Stairways to Perceptions"	David Frazee	Frank Borg	November 10, 2010	0.300
A young woman pleads with Sullivan and Lynch to re-open her sister’s childhood murder, fearing that the wrong men were convicted and sentenced to life in prison.
13	"Out of Sorrow"	Helen Shaver	Shernold Edwards	November 17, 2010	0.352
The murder investigation of a closet pedophile provides a link to Ben Sullivan’s missing son and a frantic search ensues to locate him.

== Reception ==
The premiere episode, "The Sins of the Father", was watched by 428,000 Canadian viewers. The second episode was watched by 375,000 viewers. In the UK and Republic of Ireland the series was aired on Universal as a launch programme for the channel's re-launch. It was low-rated to begin with in a 10:00 pm slot and was eventually moved to midnight to finish off its run.

== Awards and nominations ==
Year	Presenter	Award	Work	Result
2011	Gemini Awards	Best Direction in a Dramatic Series	Shattered	Nominated
2011	Gemini Awards	Best Performance by an Actor in a Continuing Leading Dramatic Role	Callum Keith Rennie	Won
2011	Gemini Awards	Best Performance by an Actress in a Continuing Leading Dramatic Role	Camille Sullivan	Nominated
