= Fairly Legal =

2011-2012 American legal comedy-drama television series

- Genre: Legal drama Comedy drama
- Created by: Michael Sardo
- Starring: Sarah Shahi; Michael Trucco; Virginia Williams; Baron Vaughn; Ryan Johnson
- Opening theme: "The Yellow Brick Road Song" by Iyeoka (season 1)
- Ending theme: "The Yellow Brick Road Song" (season 1)
- Composer: Mateo Messina
- Country of origin: United States
- Original language: English
- No. of seasons: 2
- No. of episodes: 23

Production
- Executive producers: Peter Ocko; Michael Sardo; Steve Stark; Russ Buchholz; Anton Cropper
- Producers: Drew Matich; Clara George
- Production locations: Vancouver, British Columbia, Canada; San Francisco
- Running time: 44 minutes
- Production companies: Universal Cable Productions; Garfield St. Productions (season 1); Steve Stark Productions (season 1); Ocko & Company (season 2)

Original release
- Network: USA Network
- Release: January 20, 2011 – June 15, 2012

Fairly Legal is an American legal comedy-drama television series which aired on USA Network from January 20, 2011, to June 15, 2012. The series starred Sarah Shahi, Michael Trucco, Virginia Williams, Baron Vaughn, and Ryan Johnson. USA Network canceled the show on November 1, 2012, after two seasons, due to low ratings.

== Overview ==
Fairly Legal stars Sarah Shahi as Kate Reed, a young woman who changes her profession from lawyer to mediator and works at the San Francisco law firm her father started. As the series opens, Kate's father has just died, leaving his young widow Lauren in charge as Kate and the firm adjust to the loss.

Kate and Lauren, who are approximately the same age, generally engage in comical banter while attempting to work together, and the development of their relationship is a central focus of the series. According to Shahi, the characters "take a couple steps forward and then take gigantic leaps back". She has also stated that their history divides them at certain times, and bonds them at others. "At the end of the day, they would give the shirt off of their backs to help the other person, because they are family".

== Cast and characters ==
=== Main ===
- Sarah Shahi as Kate Reed: A top lawyer at her father's firm who, after realizing her own ethical conflict with her profession, becomes an Evaluative Mediator.
- Michael Trucco as Justin Patrick: Kate's estranged, and later former, husband, Assistant District Attorney of San Francisco. They continue an on-off relationship, that continues throughout the run of the show.
- Virginia Williams as Lauren Reed: Kate's new boss and stepmother. Kate assumes that Lauren's coldness following her husband's death is proof of heartlessness, but Lauren explains that she is simply doing what is necessary to keep the firm from disintegrating in his absence. When Kate mocks her ability to be the boss, Lauren reveals she was actually running the firm in the last few years of her husband's life. Kate doesn't believe it at first, but Lauren does her best to keep the firm afloat after several of their clients go bankrupt.
- Ryan Johnson as Ben Grogan (season 2): Kate's partner and nemesis at Reed & Reed; he is a former ambulance chaser who loves money and winning. Later, he begins to partner more with Kate and becomes a potential love interest.
- Baron Vaughn as Leonardo "Leo" Prince: Kate's assistant. Enthusiastic, resourceful, and a passionate fantasy gamer. He has a knack for keeping the at-times flighty Kate out of trouble with clients and Lauren.

=== Recurring ===
- Richard Dean Anderson as David Smith: A man with many secrets who enters Kate's life after the death of her father.
- Ethan Embry as Spencer: Kate's brother, who was formerly a lawyer at the family firm. Spencer is now a stay-at-home father while his wife Terry works.
- Gerald McRaney as Judge David Nicastro: a judge who dislikes Kate for her turning to mediation, but uses her to mediate some of his cases.
- Devon Weigel as Kim (Season 1): A sandwich girl who works at Reed & Reed. She and Leonardo eventually begin dating.

== Development and production ==
Fairly Legal first appeared on the development slate for USA Network in August 2009, under the working title Facing Kate. The series was created and written by Michael Sardo, who also serves as an executive producer. Casting announcements began in late October, when Sarah Shahi was cast in the main role of Kate Reed. Michael Trucco and Virginia Williams joined the cast in early November.

The 75-minute pilot episode was directed by Bronwen Hughes. The series was given the green-light for a first season on March 15, 2010, with an additional 11 episode order. Production began in June in Vancouver, British Columbia, Canada. In September, the total number of episodes was cut from twelve to ten due to scheduling issues.

On May 2, 2011, USA Network announced that Fairly Legal had been renewed for a second season of 13 episodes, which went into production later in 2011. On January 4, 2012, it was announced the second season of Fairly Legal would premiere on March 16, 2012. The series moved to Friday at 9:00 pm, paired with In Plain Sight.

=== Music ===
The theme song, "The Yellow Brick Road Song", is performed by spoken word poet and musician Iyeoka Okoawo. Co-written by producer David Franz, it is the lead single from her album Say Yes.

== Episodes ==
=== Season 1 (2011) ===
No. overall	No. in season	Title	Directed by	Written by	Original release date	Prod. code	U.S. viewers (millions)
1	1	"Pilot"	Bronwen Hughes	Michael Sardo	January 20, 2011	FL101-75	3.88
After her father passes away, Kate Reed decides to make a change and switches her career from lawyer to mediator. Her first case is to mediate between a college-bound student and a business man, while also juggling a case involving an engagement plan gone awry and dealing with her step-mother Lauren, who is constantly getting on her nerves.
2	2	"Priceless"	Andy Wolk	Michael Sardo	January 27, 2011	FL102	4.10
Kate has a new case that involves a man who was wrongfully convicted and spent twenty-two years in prison. Meanwhile, Kate and her family open her father's will, which reveals a secret about her father's life.
3	3	"Benched"	John Showalter	Aaron Tracy	February 3, 2011	FL103	3.67
Judge Nicastro assigns Kate to mediate a case that involves angry parents and a high school football coach's actions. However, she isn't too sure about the videotaped evidence and decides to find the real reason for the school coach's highly disputed training methods. Meanwhile, Justin goes to Leonardo for advice on a good birthday present for Kate.
4	4	"Bo Me Once"	Anton Cropper	Story by : Linda Burstyn; Teleplay by : Jan Nash & Michael Sardo	February 10, 2011	FL104	3.47
When the father (Chris Ellis) of a cooking show producer attempts to extort money from her, Kate must step in to solve the woman's problems. Meanwhile, Justin tries to decide how to handle a trespassing case, and Lauren tries to keep a client from firing the firm.
5	5	"The Two Richards"	Paul Holahan	Jan Nash	February 17, 2011	FL105	3.22
Kate mediates between a man hit by a truck and an insurance agency, but quickly realizes that the real problem lies elsewhere. Meanwhile, a mysterious man from Teddy Reed's life named David Smith (Richard Dean Anderson) appears.
6	6	"Believers"	Tricia Brock	Jim Adler	February 24, 2011	FL106	3.06
An inventor (Devon Gummersall) nearly commits suicide after being fired and his boss wanting the components to his secret invention. Meanwhile, Lauren must convince a lumberjack (Dan Payne), to sign divorce papers with his ex-wife (Teryl Rothery) now in a new marriage wanting to adopt a child. Leo is chosen to draw for a graphic novel contest with Kim (Devon Weigel) the company sandwich girl agreeing to be his model.
7	7	"Coming Home"	Steven DePaul	Jim Adler	March 3, 2011	FL107	3.21
A Honduras-born U.S. soldier (Christina Vidal) is brought in for identity theft after unknowingly stealing the social security number of another woman (who she thought was dead) to enlist in the army. With these charges the soldier nearly faces deportation with Kate fighting for a compromise. Meanwhile, Kate is reluctant to sign the papers finalizing her divorce with Justin.
8	8	"UltraVinyl"	Bob Berlinger	Blair Singer	March 10, 2011	FL108	2.81
Kate mediates the case of a 1990s one-hit wonder band with one member wanting to use the band's hit song for a television commercial, despite the disagreement of the other two members.
9	9	"My Best Friend's Prenup"	Vincent Misiano	Ben Lee	March 17, 2011	FL109	4.04
An owner (Clyde Kusatsu) of martial arts dojo demands that his daughter (Brittany Ishibashi), who is one of Kate's best friends, have her fiance sign a pre-nup. Meanwhile, some of Leo's collectible desk figurines end up missing.
10	10	"Bridges"	Peter Markle	Jan Nash & Michael Sardo	March 24, 2011	FL110	4.08
Kate is caught up in an argument about a Croatian-born little girl with her male guardian and her biological grandmother both wanting full custody. Meanwhile, Kate must also deal with two feuding brothers who own a business together. Lauren finds out that Kate has been lying about meeting David Smith and decides to fire her.

=== Season 2 (2012) ===
On May 2, 2011, USA announced that Fairly Legal was renewed for a 13-episode second and final season, which premiered on March 16 and ended June 15, 2012. Production for the season began on October 28, 2011. The season has seen the introduction of a new series regular, Ryan Johnson as Ben Grogan. Mark Moses appeared in one episode as a powerful attorney. Barry Shabaka Henley appeared in the second episode as an agent "who isn't afraid to play rough." Meat Loaf appeared in the ninth episode as Charlie DeKay, a union boss who threatens to institute a strike in San Francisco.

No. overall	No. in season	Title	Directed by	Written by	Original release date	Prod. code	U.S. viewers (millions)
11	1	"Satisfaction"	Anton Cropper	Peter Ocko	March 16, 2012	FL201	3.50
Kate returns to the firm to mediate a case in which a woman claims that her grandfather was harmed by his negligent employers.
12	2	"Start Me Up"	Andy Wolk	Rob Fresco	March 23, 2012	FL202	3.36
Kate mediates a case between a hospital and the FBI. Lauren must pick a client to drop from the firm.
13	3	"Bait & Switch"	Ken Girotti	Joanna Johnson	March 30, 2012	FL203	2.77
Judge Nicastro forces Kate to take a case over an insurance dispute between a fishing captain and one of the workers that loses his hand. He also suggests that Lauren begin dating.
14	4	"Shine a Light"	Allan Kroeker	Jamie Pachino	April 6, 2012	FL204	2.91
Kate mediates a dispute over a severance package for an employee fired from an aeronautics company. Lauren and Ben argue over how to handle a settlement offer.
15	5	"Gimme Shelter"	Peter Lauer	Tawnya Bhattacharya & Ali Laventhol	April 13, 2012	FL205	2.83
A landlord is unable to pay his mortgage because one of his tenants is a drug dealer, so Kate steps in to mediate the case.
16	6	"What They Seem"	Anton Cropper	Tom Donaghy	April 20, 2012	FL206	2.92
After Justin and the San Francisco Police Department are accused of police brutality, Kate and Ben are forced to represent the victim.
17	7	"Teenage Wasteland"	Tawnia McKiernan	Ish Goldstein	April 27, 2012	FL207	2.55
Justin and Ben argue over a plea bargain while Kate visits her old school.
18	8	"Ripple of Hope"	Peter Markle	Robert Nathan	May 4, 2012	FL208	2.67
Ben helps Kate on a case at a nearby prison, and Lauren takes a case suggested by Leo.
19	9	"Kiss Me, Kate"	Michael Watkins	Roger Wolfson	May 11, 2012	FL209	1.88
Judge Nicastro enlists Kate and Ben to mediate a contract dispute. Lauren looks for a painting to hang in the lobby of the firm.
20	10	"Shattered"	Andy Wolk	Jamie Pachino	May 18, 2012	FL210	2.61
Justin and D.A. Davidson oppose Kate and Ben in a case involving a nurse whose job is on the line. Meanwhile, Lauren negotiates the purchase of an airline for a client.
21	11	"Borderline"	Matthew Penn	Joanna Johnson	June 1, 2012	FL211	2.52
Kate and Ben travel to Lake Tahoe for a mediation. Lauren and Justin work together to solve a seemingly impossible case.
22	12	"Force Majeure"	Peter Markle	Peter Ocko	June 8, 2012	FL212	2.65
Kate meets a Brazilian activist and singer (Josefina Scaglione), while a wealthy businessman (Lloyd Owen) catches Lauren's eye.
23	13	"Finale"	Anton Cropper	Peter Ocko	June 15, 2012	FL213	2.48
Kate discovers that Davidson may be involved in a scandal. Kate must also finally decide between Justin and Ben.

== Broadcast ==
In Australia, the series premiered on Seven Network on July 10, 2012, and returned for season two on May 26, 2013.

== Home media ==
Universal Studios Home Entertainment released Fairly Legal Season 1 on Region 2 DVD on January 31, 2013.

DVD Name	Ep#	Release dates		
DVD Name	Ep#	Region 1	Region 2	Region 4
Season One	10	June 5, 2012^{1}	July 24, 2012	—N/a
Season Two	13	June 11, 2013	—N/a	—N/a

^1 The wide release for the Season 1 DVD occurred on June 5, 2012. An early promotional release at Target stores occurred on March 13, 2012.

== Reception ==
=== Critical response ===
Writing for Entertainment Weekly, Darren Franich noted the similarity in formula of Fairly Legal to other successful USA Network series and described the show as "a perfectly prefabricated USA treat". He lauded Shahi's performance as Kate, saying she "makes you believe that the woman is simultaneously an anxious wreck and a brilliant mediator", and applauded some of the "interesting chances" the creators took. However, he took the show to task for not utilizing its San Francisco setting as well as other USA series use their locales and chided Fairly Legal for not knowing "whether it wants to be a somber drama or a zippy legal quirkfest". Robert Bianco for USA Today concurred in the assessment of Shahi's performance, calling it "instantly likable", and described the series as "a well-constructed piece of popular entertainment from a dependable provider of the same, with an easy-to-like star and an easy-to-grasp premise". In a review of Season 2, Bruce Fretts of TV Guide commended Williams and applauded the relationship between Lauren and Kate, noting its effect on character development.

=== Ratings ===
Fairly Legal attracted 3.9 million viewers upon first airing, with approximately one-third of viewers being in the key 18–49 ratings demographic. The episode lost about 500,000 viewers from its lead-in, the mid-season debut of the medical drama Royal Pains.

Season	Timeslot (ET)	# Ep.	Premiered		Ended		TV Season	Viewers (in millions)
Season	Timeslot (ET)	# Ep.	Date	Premiere Viewers (in millions)	Date	Finale Viewers (in millions)	TV Season	Viewers (in millions)
1	Thursday 10:00 pm	10	January 20, 2011	3.88	March 24, 2011	4.08	2011	4.58
2	Friday 9:00 pm	13	March 16, 2012	3.50	June 15, 2012	2.48	2012	2.74
