= List of assets owned by Sony =

This is a selected list of significant assets, subsidiaries, affiliates, joint ventures and brands of Sony Group Corporation, organized primarily by business segment.

== Game & network services ==
=== Sony Interactive Entertainment LLC ===
- Audeze
- Audiokinetic
- Bungie
- PlayStation Productions
- PlayStation Studios
  - Visual Arts
  - Firesprite
  - Guerrilla Games
  - Haven Studios
  - Housemarque
  - Insomniac Games
    - Insomniac North Carolina
  - Media Molecule
  - Naughty Dog
    - ICE Team
  - Nixxes Software
  - Polyphony Digital
  - Bend Studio
  - Team Asobi
  - teamLFG
  - Malaysia Studio
  - San Diego Studio
  - San Mateo Studio
  - Santa Monica Studio
  - Sucker Punch Productions
  - Valkyrie Entertainment
  - XDev

== Music ==
=== Sony Music Group ===
==== Sony Music Entertainment Inc. ====
- Columbia Records
  - Startime International
- Epic Records
  - Freebandz
- Arista Records
- Bad Boy Records
- So So Def Recordings
- Kemosabe Records
- Legacy Recordings
- The Orchard
  - Blind Pig Records
  - Frenchkiss Records
  - Shrapnel Records
  - Onimusic
- RCA Records
  - Jive Records
  - RCA Inspiration
    - Fo Yo Soul
    - GospoCentric Records
      - B'Rite Music
    - Quiet Water Entertainment
    - Verity Records
  - Roswell Records
  - Volcano Entertainment
- Ultra Records
- Sony Masterworks
  - Bluebird Records
  - Masterworks Broadway
  - Milan Records
  - Odyssey Records
  - Okeh Records
  - Playbill Records
  - Portrait Records
  - RCA Red Seal Records
  - Sony Classical Records
    - Deutsche Harmonia Mundi
- Sony Music Australia
- Sony Music Brazil
  - Amigo Records
  - Phonomotor Records
  - Som Livre
- Sony Music Canada
  - Ratas Music Group
- Sony Music China
- Sony Music France
- Sony Music Germany
  - Ariola
- Sony Music Entertainment Hong Kong
- Sony Music India
- Sony Music Indonesia
- Sony Music Latin
- Sony Music Mexico
- Sony Music Nashville
  - Arista Nashville
  - Columbia Nashville
  - RCA Records Nashville
  - Provident Entertainment
    - Essential Records
    - Flicker Records
    - Provident Films
    - Reunion Records
      - Beach Street Records
- Sony Music Philippines
- Sony Music Entertainment Poland
- Sony Music Taiwan
- Sony Music Thailand
  - Bakery Music
  - Sony BEC-TERO Music
- Sony Music UK
  - Black Butter Records (49%)
  - Columbia Records UK
  - Dream Life Records
  - Insanity Records (joint venture with Insanity Group)
  - Magic Star
  - Ministry of Sound
  - Music For Nations
  - RCA Label Group UK
  - Relentless Records
  - Since '93
  - Sony Commercial Group
  - Sony Music Legacy - UK
  - Sony Music Nashville UK
- Global Podcast Division
  - Neon Hum Media

==== Sony Music Publishing ====
- Bleeding Fingers Music
- Challenge Records
- EMI Music Publishing
- EMI Production Music
- Extreme Music
- Hickory Records
- KPM Music
- Remote Control Productions
- APM Music (joint venture with Universal Music Publishing Group)
  - Sonoton
  - Bruton Music
  - Cezame Music
  - Hard and Kosinus

=== Sony Music Entertainment Japan ===
- Aniplex
  - A-1 Pictures Inc.
  - ame pippin (joint venture with Asmik Ace and CoMix Wave Films)
  - Animec (joint venture with Kadokawa Corporation)
  - Aniplex of America Inc.
  - Aniplex (Shanghai) Ltd. (51%)
  - Boundary Inc.
  - CloverWorks Inc.
  - Crunchyroll, LLC (joint venture with Sony Pictures)
    - Crunchyroll
  - Egg Firm
    - Studio Bind (joint venture with White Fox)
  - Hayate Inc. (joint venture with Crunchyroll, LLC)
    - Lay-duce
  - JOEN (joint venture with CloverWorks, Wit Studio and Shueisha)
  - Palworld Entertainment (joint venture with Sony Music Entertainment Japan and Pocketpair)
  - Peppermint Anime GmbH (joint venture with Peppermint GmbH)
  - Myriagon Studio
  - Lasengle
  - Claynel
  - Live2D (majority stake)
- GungHo Online Entertainment (23,29%)
- Ariola Japan
- Echoes
- Epic Records Japan
- Kioon Music
  - Fitz Beat
  - Haunted Records
  - Ki/oon Records2
  - NeOSITE
  - Siren Song
  - Trefort
- M-On Entertainment, Inc.
  - Music On! TV
- mora
- Sacra Music
- Peanuts Worldwide (80%; with Sony Pictures Entertainment and Charles M. Schulz Creative Associates (20%))
- Sony Creative Products Inc.
- Sony Music Solutions Inc.
- Sony Music Artists Inc.
- Sony Music Direct (Japan) Inc.
- Sony Music Labels Inc.
- Sony Music Associated Records
- Sony Music Publishing
- Sony Music Records
  - gr8! Records
  - Mastersix Foundation
  - N46Div
  - Niagara Records
  - VVV Records
- Jisedai Inc.
- MusicRay'n Inc.
- room NB Inc.
- Zepp Hall Network Inc.
- AnyColor Inc. (5,47%)
- ArtBeat

== Pictures ==
=== Sony Pictures Entertainment Inc. ===
- Sony Pictures Studios
- Sony Pictures Studios Post Production Facilities
- Worldwide Product Fulfillment
- Madison Gate Records
- Sony Pictures Consumer Products
- Sony Pictures Experiences
  - Alamo Drafthouse Cinema
- Sony Pictures Entertainment Japan Inc. (62.1%)
  - Madhouse (3.94%)
- Sony Pictures Europe
- Sony Pictures Interactive
  - Sony Pictures Digital
  - Sony Pictures Digital Productions Inc.

==== Sony Pictures Motion Picture Group ====
- Columbia Pictures
  - Ghost Corps (Note: Trademarked as Ghostbusters, Inc.)
  - Spider-Man theatrical rights
  - Spider-Man Universe film and character rights (in conjunction with Marvel Studios)
- Sony Pictures Animation
- 3000 Pictures (Note: Trademarked as Columbia/3000 Productions)
- Screen Gems
- Sony Pictures Classics
- Sony Pictures Releasing
  - Sony Pictures Releasing International
    - Sony Pictures Releasing de México (Note: The Mexican arm of Sony Pictures Releasing)
- Sony Pictures Imageworks
- Sony Pictures Home Entertainment
  - Sony Pictures Kids Zone
- Sony Pictures Worldwide Acquisitions Group
  - Destination Films
  - Stage 6 Films
  - Affirm Films
    - Affirm Originals
      - Great American Pure Flix streaming (joint venture with Great American Media)
  - TriStar Pictures

==== Sony Pictures Television ====
- CPT Holdings, Inc.
- Embassy Row
- Sony Pictures Television Formats
- Sony Pictures Television Game Shows
  - Califon Productions, Inc.
  - Jeopardy Productions, Inc.
  - Game Show Network, LLC
    - Game Show Network (cable channel)
      - Game Show Central (FAST channel)
        - Crunchyroll Channel (FAST channel; joint venture with Sony Pictures and Sony Music Entertainment Japan-owned Aniplex's Crunchyroll, LLC)
- Sony Pictures Television Kids
- Sony Pictures Television Music Development
- Sony Pictures Television Studios

===== Sony Pictures Television International Production =====
- Bad Wolf
  - Bad Wolf America (30%)
  - Wolf Studios Wales
- Blueprint Television (joint venture with Blueprint Pictures)
- Curio Pictures
- Eleven
- Eleventh Hour Films
- Fable Pictures
- Floresta Productions
- Hot Sauce Pictures
- Left Bank Pictures
- Satisfaction Group (20%)
  - Satisfaction – The Television Agency
  - Satisfy
  - Starling
  - AH! Production
  - Enibas Productions
  - Elimac Productions
  - La Grosse Equipe
  - Alef One
  - Satisfaction Iberia
- Stellify Media
- Teleset
  - Teleset Mexico

===== Sony Pictures Television Nonfiction =====
- 19 Entertainment
  - 19 Recordings
- 32 Flavors
- B17 Entertainment
- Maxine Productions
- Rebel Minds Media
- Sharp Entertainment
- This Machine Filmworks

==== Crunchyroll, LLC (joint venture with Aniplex) ====
  - Crunchyroll
  - Crunchyroll UK and Ireland
  - Crunchyroll Store Australia
  - Crunchyroll EMEA
    - Crunchyroll SAS
    - Crunchyroll SA
    - Crunchyroll GmbH
  - Crunchyroll Games
  - Crunchyroll Manga
  - Crunchyroll Store
  - Crunchyroll Storyworks
  - Crunchyroll Channel (FAST channel; joint venture with Sony Pictures Television Game Shows' Game Show Network, LLC)
  - Hayate Inc. (joint venture with Aniplex)
    - Lay-duce

==== Sony Pictures Television Networks ====
- CPE US Networks
  - Great Entertainment Television (digital multicast network)
  - Sony Movie Channel (cable channel)
  - Sony Cine (Spanish-language cable channel)

===== International =====
- Sony Pictures Networks India
  - Sony Entertainment Television
    - Sony Ten
    - Sony Max
    - Sony Max 2
    - Sony SAB
    - SonyLIV streaming
      - Sony Six
      - Sony Aath
      - Sony BBC Earth (joint venture with BBC Studios)
      - Sony YAY!
      - Sony Pix
      - Sony Wah
      - Sony Pal
      - Sony Marathi
      - Studio NEXT

===== Sony Pictures Networks Productions =====
- AXN
  - AXN Black
  - AXN Movies
  - AXN Mystery
  - AXN Now
  - AXN Spin
  - AXN White
  - Sony AXN
  - Lifetime Latin America (joint venture with A+E Networks Latin America, distributed by Ole Distribution)
    - Sony Channel

== Entertainment, technology & services ==
=== Sony Corporation ===
- Sony Global Manufacturing & Operations Corporation
- Sony Network Communications Inc.
- Sony PCL Inc.
- FeliCa Networks Inc. (joint venture with NTT Docomo and JR East)
- Sony Marketing Inc.
- Sony Eletronics Inc.
- Sony Olympus Medical Solutions Inc.
- Sony Digital Network Applications Inc.
- Tamron (14.8%)

== Imaging & sensing solutions ==
=== Sony Semiconductor Solutions Corporation ===
- Sony Semiconductor Manufacturing
- Japan Advanced Semiconductor Manufacturing (joint venture with TSMC and Denso)
- Sony Depthsensing Solutions (formerly SoftKinetic)
- Sony Advanced Visual Sensing

== Foundations and schools ==
- Sony Foundation for Education
- Sony Music Foundation
- Sony USA Foundation Inc.
- Sony Foundation Australia Trustee Ltd.
- Sony of Canada Science Scholarship Foundation Inc.
- Sony Europe Foundation
- Shohoku College

== Subsidiaries and affiliates by location ==
This is a selected list of major subsidiaries and affiliates of Sony Group Corporation.

=== Japan ===
- Sony Music Entertainment (Japan) Inc.
  - Aniplex Inc.
  - Sony Music Labels Inc.
  - Sony Music Solutions Inc.
  - Sony Music Artists Inc.
  - Sony Creative Products Inc.
- Sony Corporation
  - Sony Global Manufacturing & Operations Corporation
  - Sony Network Communications Inc.
  - Sony PCL Inc.
  - Sony Marketing Inc.
  - Sony Olympus Medical Solutions Inc.
  - Sony Digital Network Applications Inc.
- Playstation Studios
  - Team Asobi
  - Polyphony Digital
- Sony Computer Science Laboratories, Inc.
- Sony Global Solutions Inc.
- Sony Global Education, Inc.
- P5, Inc.
- FeliCa Networks, Inc. (51%; joint venture with NTT Docomo and JR East)
- AII Inc. (60.9%)
- Frontage Inc. (60%)
- SRE Holdings (formerly Sony Real Estate Corporation) (23.1%)
- Aerosense Inc. (joint venture with ZMP Inc. and Sumitomo Corporation)
- M3, Inc. (34.5%)
- Sony Olympus Medical Solutions Inc. (51%; joint venture with Olympus)
- Sony Enterprise Co., Ltd.
  - Ginza Sony Park
- Sony People Solutions Inc.
- Sony Research Inc.
- Sony Honda Mobility (50%; joint venture with Honda)

=== United States of America ===
- Sony Corporation of America
  - Sony Music Group
    - Sony Music Entertainment
    - Sony Music Publishing
  - Sony Pictures Entertainment Inc.
    - Sony Pictures Motion Picture Group
    - Sony Pictures Television
    - Crunchyroll, LLC
    - Sony Electronics
    - Sony Biotechnology Inc.
- Sony Interactive Entertainment
  - Playstation Studios
    - Insomniac Games
    - Sucker Punch Productions
    - Bend Studio
    - Naughty Dog
    - Santa Monica Studio
    - San Diego Studio
    - teamLFG
    - Valkyrie Entertainment
  - Bungie
  - Playstation Productions

=== Europe ===
- Sony Digital Audio Disc Corporation
- Sony Europe Limited
  - Hawk-Eye Innovations Limited
  - Pulse Innovations Limited
  - Statsports Group Limited (Majority stake)
  - Sony Network Communications Europe B.V.
- Playstation Studios
  - Guerrilla Games
  - Nixxes Software
  - Housemarque
  - Media Molecule
  - Firesprite
- Sony AI

=== Other ===
- Sony Pictures Networks
  - Sony LIV
  - Sony Pix
  - Sony YAY!
- Som Livre
- Sony Pictures Imageworks

== Other investments ==
=== Japan ===
- Bandai Namco Holdings (2.5%)
- Kadokawa Corporation (10.11%)
- From Software (14.09%)
- MBS Media Holdings, Inc. (4.44%)
- VAIO Corporation (5%)
- Tamron (14.8%)
- Sony Financial Group Inc. (16.4%)
- SRE Holdings (23.1%)
- M3 Inc. (34.5%)

=== United States ===
- Devolver Digital (5%)
- Epic Games (4.9%)
- Mangamo
- Discord
- AccelByte

=== Mainland China ===
- Bilibili, Inc. (4.98%)

=== Europe ===
- Spotify Technology S.A. (2.35%)
- Raspberry Pi

== Former holdings and subsidiaries ==
=== Sold or spun off ===
- AK Holdings – sold to Nojima
  - Animax Broadcast Japan Inc. (joint venture with Bandai Namco, Toei Animation, TMS Entertainment and Nihon Ad Systems)
  - Kids Station
- Avex Group
- Chart Show TV – sold to TRACE Group (currently Trace Hits)
- Chart Show Hits – sold to TRACE Group
- Crackle – sold to Chicken Soup for the Soul Entertainment
- FEARnet HD (joint venture with Comcast and Lionsgate) – sold to Comcast and folded into Syfy and Chiller
- Film1 – sold to SPI International
- Gracenote – sold to Tribune Media (later sold to Nielsen)
- Lean-M – sold to JVM Holdings
- Loews Cineplex Entertainment – sold to Onex Corporation in 2002; theatres now owned by Cineplex Entertainment in Canada and AMC Theatres in the United States
- Movielink (joint venture with Paramount Pictures, Universal Pictures, Metro-Goldwyn-Mayer and Warner Bros.) – sold to Blockbuster LLC
- The Orchard Film Group – divested and became 1091 Media
- Sony Chemicals Corporation – sold off and became Dexerials.
- Sony Online Entertainment – sold to Columbus Nova and became Daybreak Game Company
- Sony Pictures Television France – sold to Satisfaction Group
- Sony Pictures Television Germany – sold to Banijay and became Noisy Pictures
- Sony Pictures Television's Southeast Asian channels – sold to KC Global Media
  - Animax
  - AXN
  - Gem
  - One
- Sony Pictures Television's UK channels – sold to Narrative Capital
  - Sony Channel – became Great! TV
  - Sony Movies – became Great! Movies
  - Sony Movies Action – became Great! Movies Action
  - Sony Movies Classic – became Great! Movies Classic
  - Pop
  - Pop Max
  - Tiny Pop
- Vampire Squid Productions (IP holder of Octonauts) – 49% sold to Wanda Studios
- Viasat 3 – sold to ANT1 Group
- Viasat 6 – sold to ANT1 Group
- Sunbow Entertainment – sold to TV-Loonland AG
- Starz TV – sold to TRACE Group
- The Vault – sold to TRACE Group
- Shine Group – stake sold back to the company
- Syco Entertainment (excluding Syco Music) – stake sold back to Simon Cowell
- Tuvalu Media – stake sold back to the company

=== Defunct ===
Electronics

All of these companies below were merged into Sony Electronics Corporation in April 2021, with the surviving entity changed its name to Sony Corporation.

- Sony Imaging Products & Solutions Inc.
- Sony Home Entertainment & Sound Products Inc.
- Sony Mobile Communications Inc.
- Sony Energy Devices Inc. (Liquidated)

Sony Marketing Inc., a subsidiary of Sony Corporation, merged the following company in April 2021.

- Sony Business Solutions Corporation

Sony Semiconductor Solutions Corporation

- Sony LSI Design Inc. – Merged into Sony Semiconductor Solutions Corporation in April 2022.
- Altair Semiconductor (formerly Sony Semiconductor Israel) – spun off

Sony Corporation of America

- Sony Entertainment – shut down in 2019

Sony Interactive Entertainment

- 989 Studios
- Bigbig Studios
- Bluepoint Games
- Cinemersive Labs – Integrated into SIE
- Dark Outlaw Games
- Evolution Studios
- Fabrik Games
- Firewalk Studios
- Gaikai – Integrated into SIE
- Guerrilla Cambridge
- Incognito Entertainment
- iSize – Integrated into SIE
- Japan Studio
  - Polys Entertainment – spun off into Polyphony Digital
  - Team Asobi – spun off into a separate studio
  - Team Ico
  - Team Gravity
- London Studio
- Manchester Studio
- Neon Koi
- Pixelopus
- Psygnosis/Studio Liverpool
- Repeat.gg
- SN Systems – Integrated into SIE
- Sony Imagesoft
- Team Soho
- Zipper Interactive

Sony Pictures Entertainment

- 2waytraffic – became Sony Pictures Television International Formats
  - 2waytraffic Mobile
  - 2waytraffic International
- Hooq
- 3D NetCo LLC (3net, joint venture with Discovery Communications and IMAX)
- Adelaide Productions
- Animax Europe
  - Animax Germany
- Crunchyroll Manga
- Crunchyroll Studios
- Anime Digital Network
- Anime on Demand
- Kazé
- AnimeLab
- Right Stuf – folded into Crunchyroll Store
  - Nozomi Entertainment – folded into Crunchyroll, LLC
  - 5 Points Pictures
  - Critical Mass Video
  - Lucky Penny Entertainment
- Wakanim
- Ellation – folded into Crunchyroll, LLC
  - VRV – folded into Crunchyroll
- Funimation streaming – folded into Crunchyroll
  - Funimation Channel – became Toku
  - Funimation Films
- Bliss
- Culver Entertainment
- CSC Media Group – folded into Sony Pictures Television
- Electric Ray – folded into Sony Pictures Television
- First Independent Films – folded into Columbia TriStar Home Video
- Genius Products – folded into Sony Pictures Home Entertainment
- Flava
- Gemstone Studios – folded into Sony Pictures Television's drama department
- Huaso (joint venture with Hua Long Film Digital Production)
- Human Media
- The Intellectual Property Corporation
- Movies4Men 2
- Palladium Fiction
- Pop Girl
- Scarlet Media
- Scuzz
- Silver River Productions
- Sony Channel Southeast Asia
- Sony Crime Channel
- Sony Le Plex HD
- Sony Pictures Family Entertainment Group
- Sony Pictures Mobile
- Sony Rox HD
- Stolen Picture
- True Crime
- True Drama
- True Movies 2
- TV1 General Entertainment Partnership (joint venture with CBS Studios International and NBCUniversal)
  - TV1
  - SF
- Victory Television
- TriStar Television – folded into Sony Pictures Television
- Columbia TriStar Television – rebranded as Sony Pictures Television
- Sony Pictures Networks India
  - AXN
  - Sony Le Plex
  - Sony ROX
  - Sony Mix
  - Sony ESPN

Sony Music Group

- 550 Music
- Abril Music – bought from Editora Abril in 2003 by BMG and absorbed by Ariola Records
- Battery Records (hip hop)
- Bertelsmann Music Group
  - Beyond Music (1998–2001)
  - Bluebird Records
  - BMG Heritage Records
  - BMG Interactive
    - Buddah Records
  - BMG Kidz
- BNA Records
- Burgundy Records
- Chaos Recordings
- C2 Records
- Colpix Records/Colgems Records
- Francis, Day & Hunter Ltd.
- Frenchkiss Label Group
- Indolent Records
- J Records
- GUN Records
- Kinetic Records
- LaFace Records
- Logic Records
- MTM Music Group
  - MTM Records
  - BriarPatch Music
  - CottonPatch Music
  - DebDave Music, Inc.
  - Mallven Music
- Multitone Records
- Novus Records
- Odd Future Records
- Ode Records
- Odyssey Records
- Philles Records
- Playbill Records
- Private Music
- Profile Records
- RCA Camden
- RCA Gold Seal
- RCA Italiana
- RCA Victrola
- Ruthless Records
- S2 Records
- Windham Hill Records
  - Living Music
- Vinyl Solution
- Windswept Pacific Music – catalog acquired by EMI Music Publishing
- Work Group
- Telstar Records
- Zomba Group of Companies
  - Benson Records
  - Capricorn Records
  - Internal Affairs
  - Battery Records (dance)
  - Jive Electro
  - Mojo Records
  - Scotti Brothers Records
  - Silvertone Records
  - Sub•Lime Records
  - Zoo Entertainment
- Warner Music Entertainment – folded into Sony Music Entertainment in 2013.
  - Warner Music Vision
  - Warner Vision International
  - Warner Vision Australia
  - WarnerVision Entertainment – folded into Bertelsmann Music Group in 2002.
  - KidVision – folded into BMG Video in 2004.
  - A*Vision Entertainment
  - NightVision
  - BodyVision

Sony Music Entertainment Japan

- Quatro A Inc. – absorbed into Aniplex
- Rialto Entertainment Inc. – absorbed into Aniplex
- ForwardWorks – absorbed into Aniplex

== See also ==
- Lists of corporate assets
- List of libraries owned by Sony
- List of acquisitions by Sony
