= Sony Rox HD =

- Country: India
- Headquarters: Mumbai, Maharashtra

Programming
- Picture format: 1080i (HDTV)

Ownership
- Owner: Sony
- Parent: Sony Pictures Networks India
- Sister channels: List: Sony TV Sony Max Sony Max 2 Sony SAB Sony LIV Sony Six Sony Mix Sony Aath AXN Sony Le Plex Sony PIX Sony ESPN Sony TEN Sony Wah Sony Pal Sony Marathi

History
- Launched: 16 January 2017; 9 years ago
- Closed: 31 December 2018; 7 years ago

Sony Rox HD was an Indian HD pay-TV music channel owned by Sony Pictures Networks (subsidiary of Sony Pictures Entertainment). The channel was launched on 16 January 2017 and its programming focuses on the broadcast of 2010s onwards recent Hindi-language musical videos. Sony Rox was discontinued by SPNI w.e.f 31 December 2018 at 00:00 hours.

== Programming ==
- Rhythm & Rox
- Streaming Now
- Trending Now
