= Sony Le Plex HD =

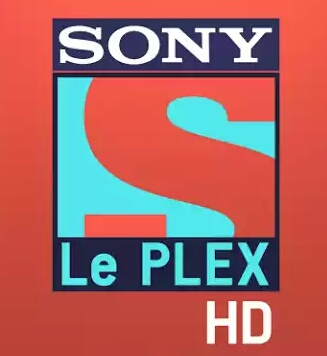
- Broadcast area: India; Nepal
- Headquarters: Mumbai, Maharashtra

Programming
- Picture format: 1080i (HDTV)

Ownership
- Owner: Sony
- Parent: Sony Pictures Networks India
- Sister channels: Sony TV; Sony MAX; Sony Max 2 Sony SAB; Sony Liv; Sony Six; Sony Mix; Sony Aath; Sony Marathi; AXN; Sony Rox; Sony PIX; Sony ESPN; Sony TEN; Sony Pix; Sony Wah; Sony Pal

History
- Launched: August 23, 2016; 10 years ago
- Closed: 31 December 2018; 7 years ago

Links
- Website: www.sonyleplex.com

Sony Le Plex HD was an Indian English-language pay-TV channel featuring popular and critically acclaimed Hollywood movies. It was launched on 23 August 2016, and was owned and operated by Sony Pictures Networks. It had the broadcast licences for Sony, Universal Studios, Lionsgate, MGM and Disney films in India.

Zoya Akhtar was the brand ambassador for Sony Le Plex when the channel was launched.

Sony Le Plex HD was discontinued by Sony Pictures Networks India on 31 December 2018 at 00:00 hours.

== See also ==
- List of Indian television stations
