= Indian Premier League on television =

Broadcasts of the Indian Premier League

The Indian Premier League (IPL) is a professional Twenty20 (T20) cricket league in India, organised by the Board of Control for Cricket in India (BCCI). It is the highest-rated sports property on Indian television, and is among the highest-valued sports properties in the world.

The domestic streaming and pay television rights to the IPL from 2023 through 2027 are currently held by JioStar, with streaming rights held by JioHotstar, and pay television rights held by Star Sports. The rights were initially awarded separately to Reliance Industries/Viacom18 and Disney Star; the domestic and international rights packages fetched a total of approximately US$6.4 billion, causing the IPL to overtake the Premier League as the second highest-valued media property in sports worldwide, behind only the National Football League (whose current media rights since 2023, dispersed across multiple broadcasters, are valued at US$111 billion in total). In late-2024, Disney merged its television and streaming businesses with those of Reliance Industries, forming JioStar, with the streaming rights moving to JioHotstar beginning in the 2025 season.

== History ==
=== 2008–2015: Sony Pictures Networks ===
The IPL's broadcast rights were first held by a partnership between Sony Pictures Networks (SPN) and World Sport Group (WSG) under a ten-year contract valued at US$1.03 billion; SPN held domestic rights in India while WSG handled international distribution. The initial plan was for twenty percent of these proceeds to go to the IPL, a further eight percent would be devoted to prize money and seventy-two percent would be distributed to the franchisees from 2008 until 2012, after which the IPL would go public and list its shares. In March 2010, however, the IPL decided not to go public and list its shares.

As of the 2015 season, coverage was largely split between Sony Max, Sony Six, and Sony ESPN; Max and Six aired broadcasts with commentary in Hindi, Six also aired broadcasts in Telugu, Kannada, Tamil, and Bengali while Sony ESPN aired broadcasts in English. SPN also produced Extraaa Innings T20, an aftershow that combined post-match analysis with an entertainment talk show featuring celebrity guests.

Sony Max often became the most-watched television channel in the country during the tournament, and by 2015, annual advertising revenue exceeded ₹12 billion (US$120 million). SPN had estimated a potential audience of 500 million during the 2015 season due to the industry adoption of the new Broadcast Audience Research Council (BARC) ratings system, which calculates viewership in both urban and rural markets rather than only urban markets.

In 2010, the IPL reached a two-year digital rights agreement with Google to stream the IPL worldwide outside of the United States on YouTube; it marked the service's first-ever foray into live, professional sports.

=== 2018–2022: Star Sports and Disney+Hotstar ===
On 4 September 2015, it was announced the IPL's then-current digital rights holder Star India (then a subsidiary of 21st Century Fox) had acquired the global media rights to the IPL under a five-year contract beginning in 2018. The contract was valued at ₹163.475 billion (US$2.55 billion), a 158% increase on the previous deal, and the most expensive broadcast rights deal in the history of cricket. The IPL sold the rights in packages for domestic television, domestic digital, and international rights; although Sony made the highest bid for domestic television, Star was the only bidder from the shortlist of 14 to make bids in all three categories. Facebook made a US$600 million bid for domestic digital rights, which American media interpreted as a sign that the service was interested in pursuing professional sports rights.

Star Sports broadcast matches on television and Hotstar (later renamed Disney+ Hotstar in 2020 after The Walt Disney Company acquired 21st Century Fox and integrated it with its global streaming brand Disney+) streamed matches in India and other markets. In September 2018, Star and Jio reached a five-year sublicencing agreement under which all domestic cricket matches aired by Hotstar—including the IPL and India national team matches—would be available via the Jio TV service for Jio Prime mobile subscribers.

=== 2023–2027: Star Sports, JioCinema and JioHotstar ===
The rights to the IPL from 2023 through 2027 were put to auction in four packages: Package A was for domestic television rights, and Package B was for domestic digital rights. Package C was for the non-exclusive digital rights to 18 matches, and Package D was for international television and digital rights, further divided into four groups. On 13 June 2022, it was reported the packages for domestic television and streaming rights had fetched at least ₹397.75 billion (nearly US$5.1 billion) in total, doubling the value of the 2018–2022 contract.

The next day, it was announced that Star Sports had renewed its contract for television rights by winning package A, and that a Viacom18 consortium had exclusively acquired the streaming rights by winning both Package B and C. The Viacom18 consortium paid a total of ₹23,758 crore (equivalent to ₹270 billion or US$2.9 billion in 2026) for its digital rights (B/C), while Disney Star paid ₹23,575 crore (equivalent to ₹270 billion or US$2.8 billion in 2026) to retain its television rights (A). Viacom18 and Times Internet jointly acquired the international rights package (D) for ₹1,300 crore (equivalent to ₹15 billion or US$160 million in 2026). With an approximate value of US$6.2 billion in total (and an estimated US$13.4 million per-match), the IPL overtook the Premier League in English football as the second highest-valued sports media property in the world, behind only the NFL (whose contracts taking effect in the 2023 season cumulatively fetched US$111 billion).

In February 2023, Viacom18 announced it would stream the 2023 IPL for free on JioCinema with feeds in 12 languages, including English and regional languages, and in 4K resolution. The same month, The Walt Disney Company reported that its loss of the IPL had contributed to a net loss of 2.4 million Disney+ subscribers worldwide, primarily in India.

Ahead of the 2023 IPL, Star launched HD feeds of Star Sports 1 in Tamil and Telugu and announced its free-to-air channel Star Utsav Movies would carry twelve matches. It was anticipated that viewership of Star Sports' broadcasts may not be heavily impacted by the Jio deal due to its existing market reach (including as rights holder of India's home matches) and viewers who preferred linear television due to being less familiar with over-the-top services, or concerns over technical issues associated with such services. JioCinema reported the IPL had 1.4 billion views on the service over the opening weekend, which was higher than the entirety of the 2022 season on Disney+ Hotstar.

In November 2024, the IPL's media rights were unified when Disney merged its Indian television and streaming businesses with Reliance/Viacom18 to form JioStar. Disney+ Hotstar and JioCinema then merged in February 2025 to form JioHotstar.

== Viewership ==
The 2023 IPL final set a then-record for the most concurrent viewers of a livestreamed event, peaking at over 32 million viewers (surpassing a record of 25.3 million set by Hotstar during the 2019 Cricket World Cup).

JioCinema reported that the 2024 season was viewed by an average of 620 million viewers, with at least 350 billion minutes streamed. The 2025 final was seen by 169 million television viewers on Star Sports, making it the most-watched cricket match on Indian television since India–Pakistan during the 2021 Men's T20 World Cup.
