= Sony Mix =

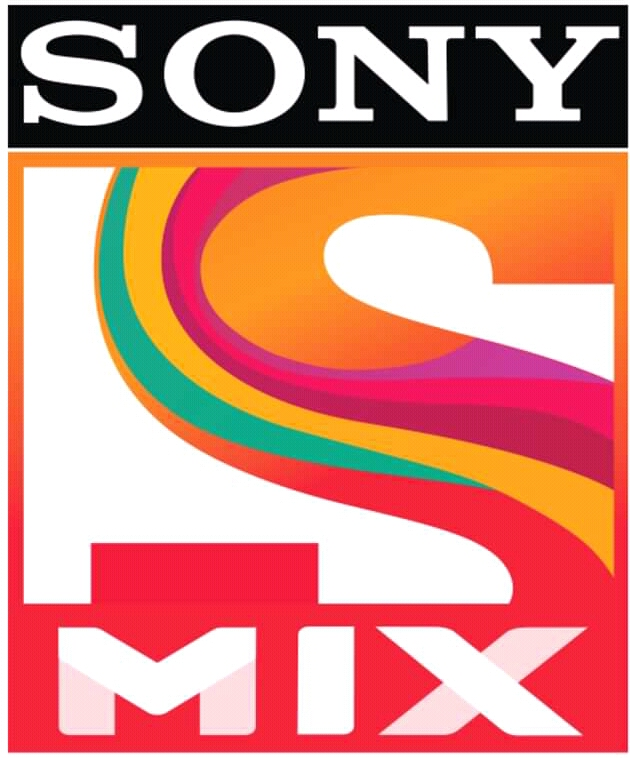
- Dekho Suno Gungunao
- Country: India
- Headquarters: Mumbai, Maharashtra, India

Programming
- Picture format: 576i SDTV

Ownership
- Owner: Sony
- Parent: Sony Pictures Networks India
- Sister channels: List: Sony TV Sony MAX Sony Max 2 Sony SAB Sony Liv Sony Six Sony Yay Sony Aath AXN Sony BBC Earth Sony Pix Sony ESPN Sony TEN Sony Wah Sony Pal Sony Marathi

History
- Launched: 1 September 2011; 13 years ago
- Closed: 31 March 2020; 4 years ago

Links
- Website: Sony Mix website

Sony MIX was an Indian pay television music channel owned by Sony Pictures Networks that broadcast Hindi-language music videos. It was launched on 1 September 2011. After more than eight years of broadcasting, the sudden decision to close one of the popular channel had many viewers expressing their dismay on social media. Sony Pictures Networks India decided to shut the broadcasting operations of Sony Mix from 31 March 2020 at 12:00 M.N. onwards from all leading DTH & MSO platforms.

== Audience Music Awards ==
The channel launched its own music awards in 2018, named Audience Music Awards to honour the artists of the Indian music industry.
