= Sony Pictures =

American media and entertainment company

Sony Pictures Entertainment Inc.
- Logo used since 1991

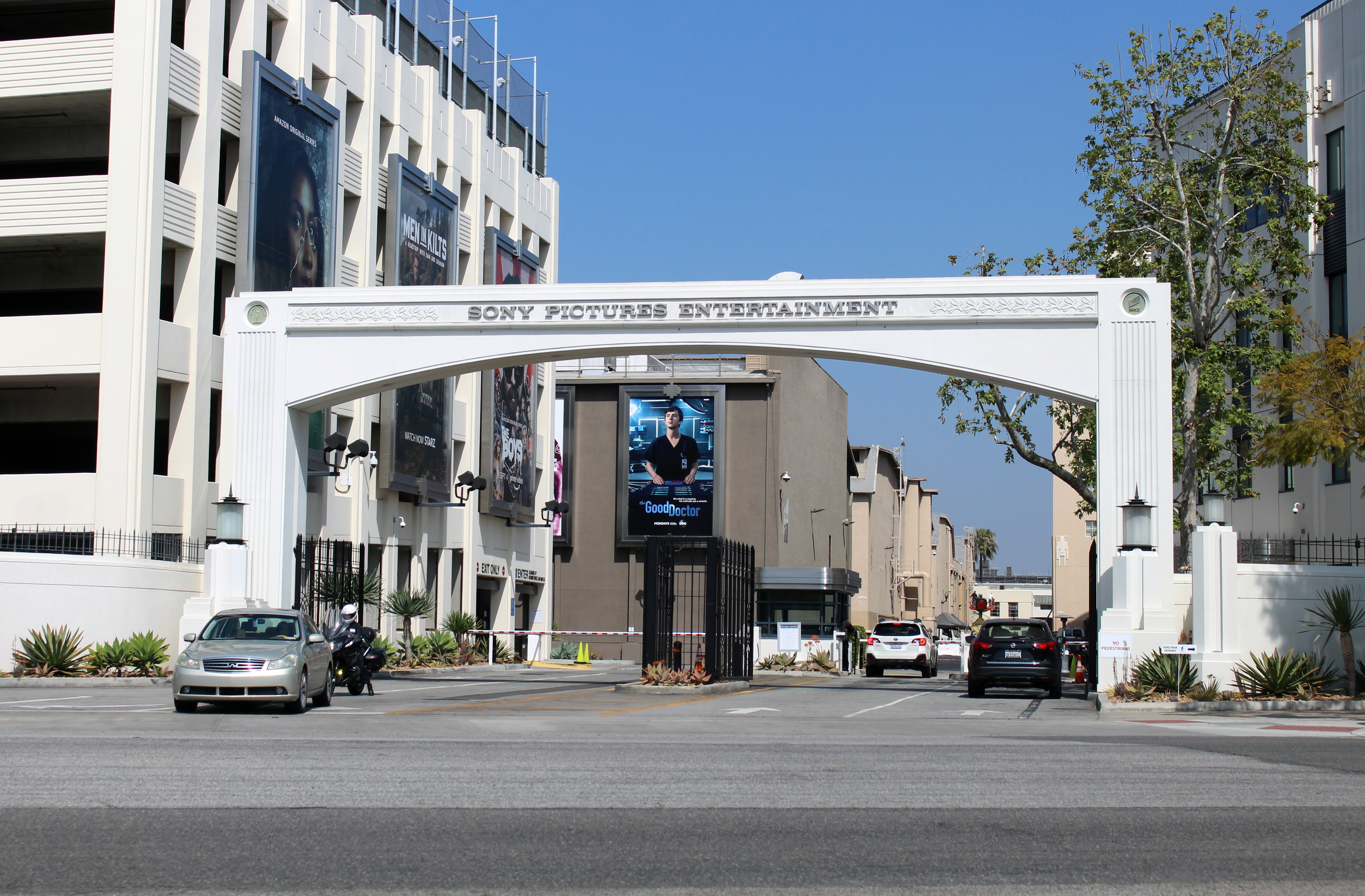
- Sony Pictures Studios in Culver City, California
- Trade name: Sony Pictures Entertainment
- Formerly: Columbia Pictures Entertainment, Inc. (1987–1991)
- Type: Subsidiary
- Industry: Entertainment
- Predecessor: The Coca-Cola Company's Entertainment Business Sector; Tri-Star Pictures, Inc.
- Founded: December 18, 1987; 38 years ago
- Founder: Victor Kaufman
- Headquarters: Poitier Building; 10202 West Washington Boulevard, Culver City, California, United States
- Area served: Worldwide
- Key people: Ravi Ahuja (chairman and CEO)
- Products: Motion pictures; Television programs; Mobile entertainment; Movie theaters
- Brands: Spider-Man (joint venture with Marvel Studios for the MCU films); Jumanji; Ghostbusters; Underworld; Men in Black; The Karate Kid
- Services: Film production and distribution; Television production and syndication; Video on demand; Digital distribution; Licensing
- Revenue: US$10.2 billion (FY2024)
- Operating income: US$795 million (FY2024)
- Number of employees: 12,000 (2026)
- Parent: The Coca-Cola Company (1987–1988); Sony Corporation of America (1989–2012); Sony Entertainment (2012–2019); Sony Group Corporation (2019–present)
- Divisions: Motion Picture Group; Television; Networks; Experiences
- Subsidiaries: See § Subsidiaries
- Website: www.sonypictures.com

Sony Pictures Entertainment Inc., commonly referred to as Sony Pictures and abbreviated as SPE, is a Japanese-owned American multinational mass media and entertainment company that produces, acquires, and distributes filmed entertainment (theatrical motion pictures, television programs, and recorded videos) through multiple platforms. It was founded on December 18, 1987, as Columbia Pictures Entertainment, Inc. from the spinoff of the Coca-Cola Company's entertainment business sector and merger with Tri-Star Pictures, Inc., with Coca-Cola initially retaining 80% in the resulting entity before reducing its stake to 49% in January 1988. The studio was wholly acquired by Sony in 1989 and renamed as SPE in 1991. Since 2026, the company is simplifying its name and logo across all divisions.

Based at the Sony Pictures Studios lot in Culver City, California, as one of the "Big Four" major American film studios, it encompasses Sony's motion picture, television production and distribution units. Sony Pictures is a member of the Motion Picture Association (MPA).

== History ==
Evolution of the Sony Group
- 1946: Akio Morita and Masaru Ibuka founded an electronics repair shop known as Tokyo Tsushin Kogyo, which would grow to become a global conglomerate
- 1955: Tokyo Tsushin released the Sony TR-55 as Japan's first transistor radio, leading the company to prioritize export markets
- 1958: Following international success with its electronics, Tokyo Tsushin would reincorporate as the Sony Corporation
- 1960: Sony entered the United States market with the establishment of a subsidiary named Sony Corporation of America
- 1968: Columbia Records was brought under a joint venture with parent company CBS, Inc. and Sony being members of the partnership
- 1970: Sony Corp became the first major Japanese company to list its shares on the New York Stock Exchange
- 1979: The Sony Walkman was released, and it achieved massive success across the 1980s as a portable audio player
- 1982: Sony partnered with Philips to invent and standardize the CD format
- 1988: CBS Records was acquired and later renamed into Sony Music Entertainment
- 1989: Columbia Pictures Entertainment was acquired from the Coca-Cola Company, bringing Sony into the film business
- 1993: Sony Interactive Entertainment was established as Sony Computer Entertainment, and it launched the PlayStation console in 1994
- 1998: Columbia Pictures and TriStar Pictures were consolidated under the Sony Pictures Motion Picture Group
- 2000: The PlayStation 2 was released, and it became the best-selling console of all time with over 160 million units sold
- 2002: Columbia TriStar Television and Columbia TriStar International Television are rebranded as Sony Pictures Television and Sony Pictures Television International, Sam Raimi's Spider-Man was released, becoming one of the most successful superhero films in the 2000s.
- 2004: Sony Music Entertainment buys half of Bertelsmann Music Group who owned RCA Records, Sony would later buy the remaining half of Sony BMG in 2008
- 2006: Sony launches the Blu-ray format, The PlayStation 3 was released, becoming the most expensive video game console at the time, Crunchyroll was established.
- 2013: The PlayStation 4 was released, having outsold Microsoft's Xbox One a few months after launch. Sony sells the Vaio brand to Japan Industrial Partners
- 2016: Sony reacquired the remaining stake in Sony/ATV Music Publishing from the Estate of Michael Jackson
- 2019: Sony Music Group was established, and Sony Entertainment was dissolved
- 2020: The PlayStation 5 was released.
- 2021: Sony Corporation rebrands as Sony Group Corporation, The Crunchyroll anime service was acquired from AT&T's WarnerMedia, and integrated into Sony's Funimation

=== 1987–1989 ===
On September 1, 1987, the Coca-Cola Company announced plans to spin off Columbia Pictures, which it had owned since 1982. Under this arrangement, Coca-Cola would sell its entertainment assets (Coca-Cola's Entertainment Business Sector) to TriStar Pictures, of which it owned 39.6%. Tri-Star would be renamed Columbia Pictures Entertainment, Inc. (CPE), with Coca-Cola owning 49%, its shareholders owning 31%, and Tri-Star's shareholders owning 20%. As part of a merger plan, the two television divisions Columbia/Embassy Television and Tri-Star Television, merged altogether to form a new incarnation of Columbia Pictures Television.

The merger enabled three top Tri-Star executives, namely Arnold Messner, who ran Tri-Star Telecommunications, Victor A. Kaufman, who ran the main Tri-Star Pictures studio, and Scott Siegler, who ran Tri-Star Television to stay on, while four of the Coca-Cola Entertainment Business Sector departed, namely Barbara Corday, who ran Columbia/Embassy Television as president, Herman Rush and Peter Seale, who ran Coca-Cola Telecommunications, and Brian McGrath, who was the president of the Coca-Cola Entertainment Business Sector. In early December 1987, former Coke EBS vice president Kenneth Lemberger exited the post to join Tri-Star Pictures, displacing Roger Faxon, who had joined Columbia Pictures as senior vice president of the studio.

The merger was approved by shareholders on December 15, 1987, and it was completed three days later. Columbia and Tri-Star brands would be used as separate and autonomous production entities, and would be part of CPE as a whole, along with the prior assets, units and commitments of the former Coca-Cola Entertainment Business Sector, which included all feature, television, home video, and pay cable operations as well as the Entertainment Sector's feature production deal with Nelson Entertainment and its investment in Castle Rock Entertainment, and TeleVentures; a company it continues to own, which was linked to three independent companies: Tri-Star Pictures, Stephen J. Cannell Productions and Witt/Thomas Productions. Merv Griffin Enterprises continues to function as a separate operation. A new company was formed in early 1988 with the Tri-Star name to take over the studio's operations.

In early January 1988, CPE announced that they would revive the Triumph branding for the new worldwide subsidiary, Triumph Releasing Corporation, which was functioned as a theatrical distributor, marketing and promotion for Columbia and Tri-Star films, and named Patrick N. Williamson as president of the unit and the company provided administrative services related to distribution of its films in North America, while internationally, would be responsible for the direction of each studio.

On September 28, 1989, Sony obtained an option to purchase all of The Coca-Cola Company's stock (approximately 54 million shares or 49% of the outstanding shares) in CPE for $27 per share. The next day, Sony also announced that it reached an agreement with Guber-Peters Entertainment Company, Inc. (NASDAQ: GPEC; formerly Barris Industries, Inc.) to acquire GPEC for $200 million when Sony hired Peter Guber and Jon Peters to be its co-chairmen. This was all led by Norio Ohga, who was the president and CEO of Sony during that time.

The hiring of Guber and Peters by Sony to run Columbia was conflicted by a previous contract the producers had signed at Warner Bros. Time Warner's chairman, Steve Ross, threatened Sony with a lawsuit for breach of contract. The lawsuit would be subsequently dropped when Sony sold half-interest in Columbia House and cable distribution rights to Columbia's feature films, TV movies, and miniseries to Warner Bros. That same agreement also saw Columbia sell its 35% interest in the Burbank Studios and acquired Lorimar Studios, previously the MGM lot, from Warner Bros.

On October 31, 1989, Sony completed a friendly takeover bid for the rest of shares (51%) of CPE, which was a public company listed on the New York Stock Exchange (NYSE: KPE), and acquired 99.3% of the common stock of the company. On November 8, 1989, Sony completed the acquisition by a "short-form" merger of its wholly owned subsidiary Sony Columbia Acquisition Corporation into CPE under the Delaware General Corporation Law. Sony also completed a tender offer for shares of common stock of the Guber-Peters Entertainment Company on November 6, 1989, and acquired the company 3 days later. The acquisition cost Sony $4.9 billion ($3.55 billion for shares and $1.4 billion of long-term debt) and was backed (financed) by five major Japanese banks Mitsui, Tokyo, Fuji, Mitsubishi and Industrial Bank of Japan.

=== 1990s ===
The company was renamed as Sony Pictures Entertainment on August 7, 1991. The Sony Pictures name was previously used for a unit of Sony Video Software Company that started producing films as early as 1988. Also that year, Jon Peters left Columbia to start Peters Entertainment with a three-year exclusive production agreement at the studio at first, before transitioning to a non-exclusive deal at the studio. Longtime CPE employee Laurie MacDonald also left to start Aerial Pictures at the studio, first for a two-year deal, before going to 20th Century Fox in 1993, and being swallowed up by Amblin Entertainment later that year, eventually setting up DreamWorks.

Sony has since created numerous other film production and distribution units, such as creating Sony Pictures Classics for art-house fare, by forming Columbia TriStar Pictures (also known as the Columbia TriStar Motion Picture Group) by merging Columbia Pictures and TriStar Pictures in 1998, revitalizing Columbia's former television division Screen Gems.

=== 2000s ===
In July 2000, a marketing executive working for Sony Corporation created a fictitious film critic, David Manning, who gave consistently good reviews for releases from Sony subsidiary Columbia Pictures that generally received poor reviews amongst real critics. Sony later pulled the ads, suspended Manning's creator and his supervisor and paid fines to the state of Connecticut and to fans who saw the reviewed films in the US.

It expanded its operations on April 8, 2005, when a Sony-led consortium acquired the legendary Hollywood studio Metro-Goldwyn-Mayer (MGM), in a US$4.8 billion leveraged buyout, through the holding company MGM Holdings Inc.

On June 4, 2008, SPE's wholly owned group 2JS Productions B.V. acquired Dutch production company 2waytraffic N.V., famous for Who Wants to Be a Millionaire?, acquired from the original production company Celador, and You Are What You Eat for £114.3 million ($223.2 million in US dollars).

=== 2010s ===
In 2011, the Sony Pictures computer network was breached and approximately one million user accounts associated with the SonyPictures.com website were leaked.

On November 18, 2012, Sony Pictures announced it has passed $4 billion with the success of releases: Skyfall, The Amazing Spider-Man, 21 Jump Street, Men in Black 3, Hotel Transylvania, Underworld: Awakening, The Vow, and Resident Evil: Retribution. On November 21, 2013, SPE and Sony Entertainment's CEO Michael Lynton announced that SPE will shift emphasis from movies to television by cutting its 2014 film slate. It was also announced on the same day, that there would be more Spider-Man sequels and spin-offs, though on February 10, 2015, Sony Pictures eventually signed a deal with Disney's Marvel Studios to allow Spider-Man to appear in the Marvel Cinematic Universe, beginning with Captain America: Civil War, before appearing in Spider-Man: Homecoming which was released on July 7, 2017. The deal also allowed Sony to distribute and have creative control on any MCU film where Spider-Man is the main character (such as Homecoming and its sequel Spider-Man: Far From Home), while Disney would distribute MCU films where Spider-Man appears without being the main character.

On January 22, 2014, SPE folded its technology unit into the various cores of its businesses. In April, Sony Pictures arranged a film financing deal worth $200 million with LStar Capital, the credit venture of Lone Star Capital and Citibank, half in debt and the other in equity to fund most of SPE's film slate for several years. SPE was originally considering a $300 million deal with Blue Anchor Entertainment, led by Bloom Hergott partner John LaViolette and former investment banker & producer Joseph M. Singer, and backed by Longhorn Capital Management and Deutsche Bank, which was held up by regulatory matters.

In November 2019, Sony purchased the remaining 42% stake in GSN from AT&T, placing it under the direction of its television division.

=== 2020s ===
In April 2021, Sony signed a first-look deal with Netflix, allowing the streaming service to host their films following their theatrical runs and home media releases. That same month, the company also entered into a multi-year licensing agreement with The Walt Disney Company for its films to stream across Disney's streaming and linear platforms, including Disney+ and Hulu.

In February 2022, Sony signed a deal with WarnerMedia Europe to stream its theatrical films on HBO Max for Central and Eastern Europe countries.

On November 28, 2022, it was announced that Legendary Entertainment reached a distribution deal with Sony to distribute its future slate of films. However, this deal does not include the Dune and MonsterVerse films as they will remain at Warner Bros. The deal came after the negative impact of the merger of Warner Bros.' parent company WarnerMedia with Discovery, Inc. to form Warner Bros. Discovery.

On November 14, 2023, Sony Pictures unveiled a special centennial anniversary logo for its Columbia Pictures unit ahead of its 100th anniversary of its founding on January 10, 2024.

On April 18, 2024, it was reported that Sony was interested in acquiring Paramount Global through a joint buyout with Apollo Global Management. Sony and Apollo submitted a $26 billion all-cash offer to acquire Paramount Global on May 2, 2024. A special committee of Paramount's board of directors met on May 5, 2024, and signed off on beginning deal talks with Sony and Apollo. Sony would drop the deal when Paramount announced a merger with Skydance Media in July of that year.

On June 12, 2024, Sony Pictures acquired Alamo Drafthouse Cinema for an undisclosed sum. This marked the first time in more than 75 years that a major Hollywood studio would own a theater chain, as the 1948 federal ruling from United States v. Paramount Pictures, Inc. prevented them from owning exhibition companies until 2020. Alamo Drafthouse will continue to operate their film festival Fantastic Fest, which is included in the acquisition.

In September 2024, Sony Group announced the appointment of SPE president and COO Ravi Ahuja as CEO of Sony Pictures Entertainment effective January 2, 2025, succeeding Tony Vinciquerra, who remained chairman until December 31, 2025.

On December 19, 2025, Sony announced their intent to purchase a 41% stake in Peanuts Holdings, LLC. from WildBrain, with the stake being combined with sister company Sony Music Entertainment Japan's existing 39% stake in Peanuts Holdings to an controlling 80% stake, with 20% of the holding company retained by the family of Peanuts creator Charles M. Schulz. The acquisition of the stake was finalized on March 2, 2026.

In March 17, 2026, Sony Pictures inked a multi-year first look deal with MACRO Film Studios to help co-finance theatrical films. The first one was Goat, an animated sports comedy made by Sony Pictures Animation and basketball player Stephen Curry, and his company, Unanimous Media.

On April 7, 2026, Variety, Deadline Hollywood, and The Hollywood Reporter reported that Sony Pictures' CEO, Ravi Ahuja, announced the company would lay off "hundreds of employees" as part of a reorganization at the company to focus on "strategic priorities". In a memo written to staff at the company, Ahuja said, "Over the past year, we have sharpened our strategy and clarified where we believe the greatest opportunities exist," also adding: "As we lean into those priorities, we need to operate with greater focus, speed, and alignment to strengthen our differentiated capabilities."

In July 2026, it was reported that Sony was among several parties—including Netflix, Versant, RedBird and Paramount—in early talks to buy online film discovery platform Letterboxd.

On September 24, 2026, Sony Pictures continued its bidding war for Letterboxd with A24 and The New York Times, as Letterboxd considered getting a new name under new ownership.

== 2014 hack ==
In November 2014, the Sony Pictures computer network was compromised by a group of hackers named Guardians of Peace, disabling many computers. Later the same week, five of Sony Pictures' movies were leaked, including some not yet released (such as Fury and Annie), as well as confidential data about 47,000 current and former Sony employees. Film historian Wheeler Winston Dixon suggested that the hack, which exposed the inner workings of the studio, was "not a pretty picture," and served as a "wake-up call to the entire industry." The hack also revealed some other documents, emails between Hollywood moguls referring to Barack Obama's cinematic tastes, a possible partnership with Marvel Studios for the inclusion of the superhero Spider-Man in Captain America: Civil War, which was later confirmed in February 2015, amongst others. On December 16, the hackers issued a warning to moviegoers, threatening to attack anyone who sees The Interview during the holidays and urging people to "remember the 11th of September 2001". On December 17, 2014, Sony cancelled the previously planned December 25 release of The Interview in response to hacker threats.

On February 24, 2015, Tom Rothman was named chairman of SPE's motion picture group to replace Amy Pascal.

On April 16, 2015, WikiLeaks published over 30,287 documents, 173 e-mails, and 2,200 corporate e-mail addresses of Sony Pictures' employees. WikiLeaks said in a press release that the content of the leaks were "newsworthy and at the center of a geo-political conflict" and belonged "in the public domain". Sony Pictures later condemned the hack and subsequent leaks, calling it a "malicious criminal act", while also criticizing WikiLeaks for describing the leaked content as public domain.

Seth Rogen has expressed doubts about North Korea being responsible for the 2014 Sony hack. Based on the timeline of events and the amount of information hacked, he believes the hack may have been conducted by a Sony employee.

== Sale of headquarters ==
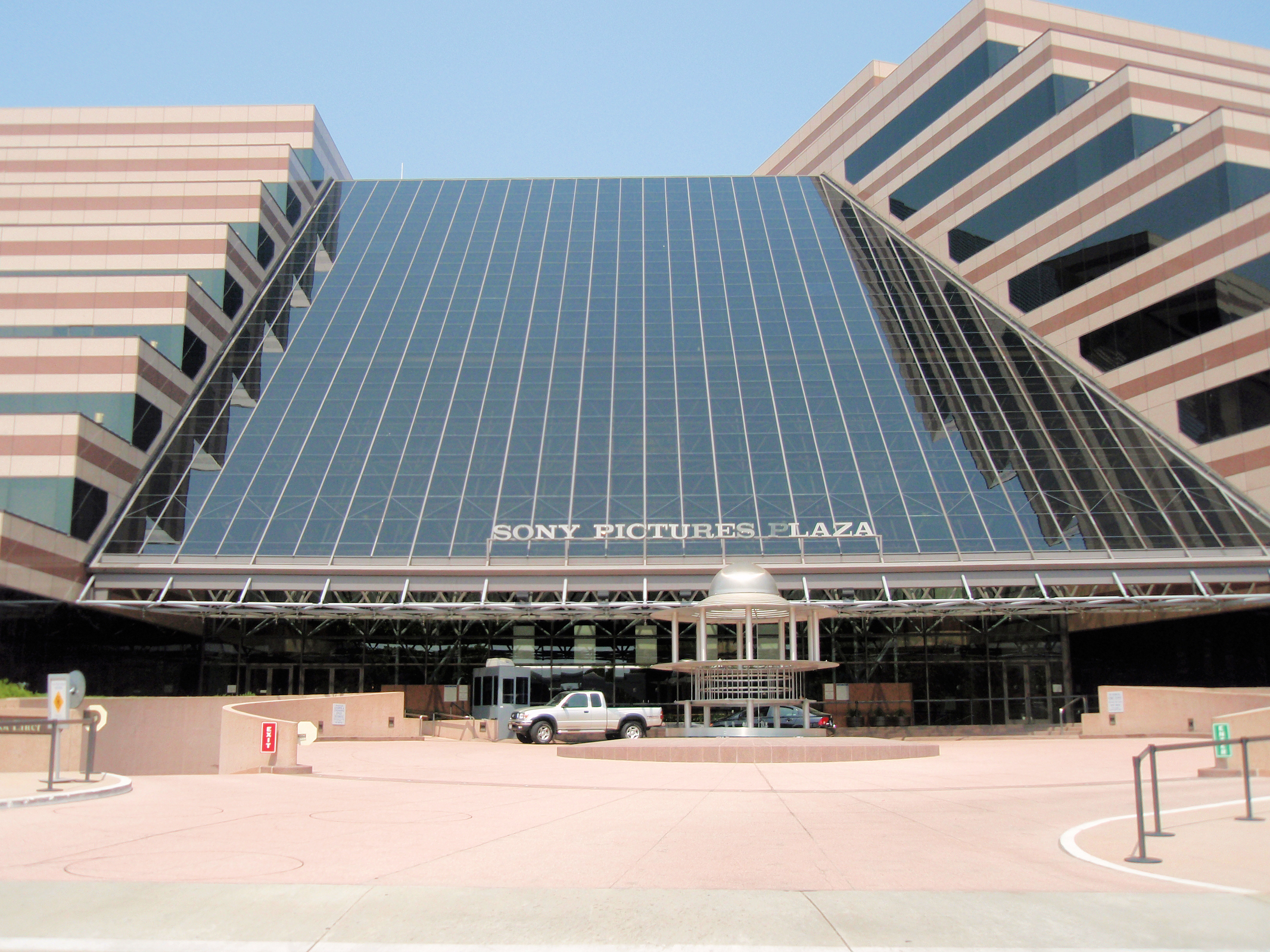
Sony Pictures Plaza in 2008

In 2014, the eight-story, 260,000sq ft building originally designed by architect Maxwell Starkman and known as Sony Pictures Plaza, which was originally the headquarters of MGM Studios and later Sony Pictures Studios, was sold to Runyon Group and fellow developer LBA Realty for $159 million.

== Corporate structure ==
Headquartered in Culver City, California, U.S., SPE comprises various studios and entertainment brands, including Affirm Films, Columbia Pictures, Screen Gems, Sony Pictures Classics, TriStar Pictures, Crunchyroll, Game Show Network and Alamo Drafthouse Cinema.

=== Senior management team ===
- Ravi Ahuja
  - Chairman and CEO, Sony Pictures Entertainment
- Tahra Grant
  - Executive Vice President & Chief Communications Officer, Sony Pictures Entertainment
- Stacy Green
  - Executive Vice President & Chief People Officer, Sony Pictures Entertainment
- Jay Levine
  - Executive Vice President & Chief Strategy Officer and Business Operations, Sony Pictures Entertainment
- Jill Ratner
  - Executive Vice President & General Counsel, Sony Pictures Entertainment
- Drew Shearer
  - Executive Vice President & chief financial officer, Sony Pictures Entertainment
- Tom Rothman
  - Chairman and CEO, Sony Pictures Motion Picture Group
- Keith Le Goy
  - Chairman, Sony Pictures Television
- Katherine Pope
  - President, Sony Pictures Television Studios, Sony Pictures Television
- Michael Kustermann
  - CEO, Sony Pictures Experiences and Alamo Drafthouse Cinema

=== Motion Picture Group ===
- Sony Pictures Motion Picture Group (SPMPG): Formerly Columbia TriStar Motion Picture Group. It is the motion picture division of SPE founded in 1998. With a library of more than 4,000 films (including 12 Academy Award for Best Picture winners), as of 2004 this unit of Sony distributes about 22 films a year under its various studio brands in 67 countries. The group owns studio facilities in the United States, Hong Kong, Madrid, Mexico, the United Kingdom, Brazil and Japan.
  - Columbia Pictures: Founded in 1924 by Harry Cohn, Sony acquired the studio in 1989 from The Coca-Cola Company for $3.4 billion.
    - Ghost Corps: Oversees projects relating to the Ghostbusters franchise, including films, television shows, and merchandising.
    - Deutsche Columbia Pictures Filmproduktion: Founded in 1998 to produce films for German-speaking territories under the Columbia name. It was shut down in 2003 and was later relaunched in 2008.
  - TriStar Pictures: Formed in 1982 as a joint venture between Columbia Pictures, HBO, and CBS. Became part of Columbia Pictures Entertainment in December 1987 and the Sony ownership in 1989. Was relaunched in 2004 as a marketing and acquisitions unit that specializes in the genre and independent films.
    - TriStar Productions: A film and television production company which is a joint-venture between Tom Rothman and SPE.
  - Screen Gems: Originally Columbia's animation division and later a television production company best known for TV's Bewitched and The Partridge Family, as well as bringing The Three Stooges short subjects to TV in 1958. Sony revived the Screen Gems brand in 1998 to develop mid-priced movies (production budget of between $20 million and $50 million) in specific genres such as science fiction, horror, black cinema and franchise films.
    - Scream Gems: A short film specialty label of Screen Gems.
  - Sony Pictures Imageworks: Founded in 1992, it is Sony's in-house visual effects and computer animation studio.
  - Sony Pictures Animation: Founded in 2002, it is Sony's animation studio that produces animated feature films as well as animated television series.
  - Sony Pictures Classics: Founded in 1992, it is Sony's specialty film label that distributes, produces and acquires films such as documentaries, independent and arthouse films in the United States and internationally.
  - 3000 Pictures: A production company that was launched in July 2019 by Elizabeth Gabler, former Fox 2000 Pictures president, who henced the name. This is a joint venture between Sony Pictures Entertainment and HarperCollins, producing HarperCollins adaptations.
  - Sony Pictures Releasing: Founded in 1994 as a successor to Triumph Releasing Corporation. The unit handles distribution, marketing, and promotion for films produced by Sony Pictures Entertainment; including Columbia Pictures, TriStar Pictures, Screen Gems, Sony Pictures Classics, among others.^{1}
    - Sony Pictures Releasing International: Formerly known as Columbia TriStar Film Distributors International. It is the international arm of Sony Pictures Releasing.
      - Sony Pictures India: A production house established by Sony to release Indian movies and distribute Hollywood movies released under Columbia Pictures.
      - Sony Pictures International Productions: A division that produces films in local languages other than English around the world.
  - Sony Pictures Worldwide Acquisitions (SPWA): Formerly Worldwide SPE Acquisitions, Inc. A Sony division founded in 2007 which acquires and produces about 60 films per year for a wide variety of distribution platforms, especially for non-theatrical markets.
    - Destination Films: A motion picture company founded in 1998 which currently specializes in action, thriller, sci-fi, niche and low-end to medium-end horror films that was purchased by Sony in 2001.
    - Stage 6 Films: A direct-to-video label founded in 2007. Also releases some films theatrically.
    - Affirm Films: A motion picture label founded in 2007 to release gospel and Christian films.
      - Great American Pure Flix: Launched as Pure Flix in 2015. A streaming service which is a joint venture between Affirm Films and Great American Media.

=== Home Entertainment ===
- Sony Pictures Home Entertainment (SPHE): Formerly Columbia Pictures Home Entertainment, RCA/Columbia Pictures Home Video, Columbia TriStar Home Video and Columbia TriStar Home Entertainment. Founded in 1978 as the home video arm of Columbia Pictures, it currently manufactures and distributes the Sony film and television libraries on Blu-ray, Ultra HD Blu-ray, Blu-ray 3D, DVD, and digital download.
  - Sony Pictures Kids Zone: Formerly Sony Kids' Music/Video, Sony Wonder and Sony Pictures Family Fun. The former music and video label of Sony Music Entertainment and later Sony BMG, it became the kids and family entertainment label of SPHE in 2007.

=== Television Group ===
- Sony Pictures Television (SPT): Formerly Sony Television Entertainment and the Columbia TriStar Television Group. The successor-in-interest to Columbia's television division (first Screen Gems, later Columbia Pictures Television, TriStar Television, and Columbia TriStar Television) founded in 2002, as of 2004 the unit was producing 60 titles for various television outlets globally. Contains a library that includes more than 35,000 episodes of more than 270 television series and 22,000 game show episodes under the Sony Pictures Television brand, and the television rights to the Embassy Pictures library (including The Graduate and The Lion in Winter) and also the owner of the television division "Embassy Television"—among other notable shows in this library are Party of Five, The Shield, Seinfeld, The King of Queens, Days of Our Lives and The Young and the Restless.
  - Affirm Television: The television division of Affirm Films founded in 2019 as a partnership with SPT.
  - Embassy Row: A television and digital production company founded by Michael Davies in 2005. SPT acquired the company on January 14, 2009.
  - Sony Pictures Television Formats (SPTF)
  - Sony Pictures Television Game Shows (SPTGS): The game show production division of SPT formed in 2022.
    - Califon Productions: The production company responsible for Wheel of Fortune.
    - Jeopardy Productions: The production company responsible for Jeopardy!.
  - Sony Pictures Television International Production (SPTIP): Formerly Columbia TriStar International Television and Sony Pictures Television International. It is the international television production division of SPT operating several wholly owned and joint-venture companies in 12 countries.
    - Bad Wolf: A British television production company founded in 2021 by Julie Gardner and Jane Tranter in 2015. SPT acquired the company in 2021.
      - Wolf Studios Wales
      - Bad Wolf America: An American production established in 2019 of which sister company Bad Wolf owns 30%.
    - Blueprint Television: The television division of the British production company Blueprint Pictures. SPT acquired a minority stake in 2016.
    - Curio Pictures: Formerly Playmaker Media. An Australian production company founded in 2009 by David Taylor and David Maher. SPT acquired the company in 2014.
    - Eleven: A British production company founded by Jamie Campbell and Joel Wilson in 2006. SPT acquired the company in 2020.
    - Eleventh Hour Films: A British production company founded by Jill Green in 2010. SPT acquired a minority stake in the company in 2018, then a majority stake in 2024.
    - Fable Pictures: A British production company founded by Faye Ward in 2016. SPT acquired a minority stake in 2016.
    - Floresta: A Brazilian production company founded in 2010.
    - Hot Sauce Pictures: A Northern Irish production company founded in 2024 by Declan Law and Adam Patterson as a joint venture with SPT.
    - Left Bank Pictures: A British production company founded in 2007 by Andy Harries, Francis Hopkinson, and Marigo Kehoe. SPT acquired a majority stake in 2012.
    - Satisfaction Group: A French production company founded in 2010 by Jacques Essebag. SPT acquired a 20% stake in 2020.
      - Satisfaction – The Television Agency
      - Satisfy
      - Starling
      - AH! Production
      - Enibas Productions
      - Elimac Productions
      - La Grosse Equipe
      - Alef One
      - Satisfaction Iberia
    - Stellify Media: A Northern Irish production company founded in 2014 by Kieran Doherty and Matthew Worthy as a joint venture with SPT.
    - Teleset: A television production company founded in 1995. SPT acquired the company in 2009.
  - Sony Pictures Television Kids (SPTK): Formerly Silvergate Media. A production company founded in 2011 by Waheed Alli and William Astor. The company is best known for the animated series Hilda and Octonauts. SPT acquired the company in 2019.
  - Sony Pictures Television Music Development (SPTMD): The music development division of SPT formed in 2023.
  - Sony Pictures Television Nonfiction (SPTNF): Formerly CKX, Inc., CORE Media Group and Industrial Media. A television production company founded in 2005 by Robert F. X. Sillerman. With a library of more than 100 series broadcast in over 35 countries as of 2023, this unit produces nonfiction and documentary programming. SPT acquired the company in 2022.
    - 19 Entertainment: A television production company founded in 1985 by Simon Fuller known for producing the So You Think You Can Dance and Idol franchises.
      - 19 Recordings: The music division of 19 Entertainment founded in 1999 by Simon Fuller.
    - 32 Flavors: A television production company founded in 2023 by Alex Baskin.
    - B17 Entertainment: A television production company founded in 2013 by Rhett Bachner and Brien Meagher.
    - Brass Monkeys Media
    - The Intellectual Property Corporation: A television production company founded in 2016 by Eli Holzman and Aaron Saidman.
    - Maxine Productions: A film and television production company founded in 2023 by Mary Robertson.
    - Rebel Minds Media: A television production company founded in 2026 by Simon Shalgosky and Daniel Brookes.
    - Sharp Entertainment: A television production company founded in 2003 by Matt Sharp.
    - This Machine Filmworks: A film and television production company founded in 2020 by R. J. Cutler.
  - Sony Pictures Television Studios (SPTS): A production name launched on July 25, 2017, to carry out the SPT library, starting on January 7, 2020. It was dissolved in 2022 and phased out in 2023.

== Sony Pictures Television Networks ==
=== United States ===
- Game Show Network, LLC
  - Game Show Network (GSN): A basic cable channel launched in 1994 broadcasting game shows.
  - Game Show Central: A free ad-supported streaming television network broadcasting archived original programming from the GSN network.
  - Crunchyroll Channel: A free ad-supported streaming television network launched in 2023 broadcasting anime managed as a joint venture with Sony Pictures and Sony Music Entertainment Japan-owned Aniplex's Crunchyroll, LLC.
- CPE US Networks, Inc.
  - Get: A digital multicast network broadcasting classic programming from the 1960s through the 2000s.
  - Sony Cine: A Spanish-language cable channel.
  - Sony Movie Channel: A cable channel launched in 2010 broadcasting films from the SPE library as well as from other distributors.

=== International ===
- AXN: A general entertainment television network launched in 1997 which airs across Asia, Latin America and Europe.
- Sony Channel: A brand of general entertainment channels.
- Sony Pictures Networks India (SPNI): Formerly Sony Entertainment Television India Private Limited and Multi Screen Media Private Limited. Legally Culver Max Entertainment (CME), it is a subsidiary of Sony Group Corporation based in India founded in 1995. Sony Entertainment Television and Sony SAB are its main brands. It also owns many other companies and brands under the Sony brand.
  - Sony Aath
  - Sony BBC Earth (50%, joint venture with BBC Studios)
  - Sony Entertainment Television
  - Sony Kal
  - Sony Marathi
  - Sony Max
  - Sony Max 2
  - Sony Pal
  - Sony Pictures Networks Productions
  - Sony Pix
  - Sony SAB
  - Sony Sports Network
    - Sony Sports Ten 1
    - Sony Sports Ten 2
    - Sony Sports Ten 3
    - Sony Sports Ten 4
    - Sony Sports Ten 5
  - Sony Wah
  - Sony YAY!
  - Studio NEXT

== Other Sony Pictures operations ==
- Columbia TriStar Marketing Group (CTMG)
- Crunchyroll, LLC: Formerly Funimation, Inc., Funimation Productions, Ltd., Funimation Entertainment and Funimation Global Group, LLC. A distributor of anime series and films founded in 1994 by Gen Fukunaga and Cindy Brennan managed as a joint venture with Sony Music Entertainment Japan's Aniplex.
  - Crunchyroll: The eponymous streaming service launched in 2006. It was acquired by Sony in 2021 from AT&T.
  - Crunchyroll UK and Ireland: Formerly Golden Square Music, Island World Communications, Manga Entertainment and Funimation UK and Ireland. Legally Crunchyroll Ltd., is the British division of Crunchyroll, LLC founded in 1987.
  - Crunchyroll Store Australia: Formerly Madman Anime. Legally Crunchyroll Pty Ltd, is the Australian division of Crunchyroll, LLC founded in 2016 by Tim Anderson and Paul Wiegard.
  - Crunchyroll EMEA: Formerly Viz Media Europe. The division of Crunchyroll, LLC founded in 2007 that serves Africa, the Middle East and non-English speaking Europe. It was acquired by Crunchyroll in 2019 from Viz Media.
    - Crunchyroll SAS: The French division of Crunchyroll EMEA.
    - Crunchyroll SA: The Swiss division of Crunchyroll EMEA.
    - Crunchyroll GmbH: The German division of Crunchyroll EMEA.
  - Crunchyroll Games: The gaming division of Crunchyroll, LLC.
  - Crunchyroll, Inc.: The Japanese division of Crunchyroll, LLC.
  - Crunchyroll Store: An anime distributor and online shop.
  - Crunchyroll Channel: A free ad-supported streaming television network launched in 2023 broadcasting anime managed as a joint venture with Sony Pictures Television Game Shows' Game Show Network, LLC.
  - Hayate: An animation studio launched in 2025 which is a joint venture between Crunchyroll and Aniplex.
    - Lay-duce: A Japanese animation studio founded in 2013 by Noritomo Yonai. It was acquired by Hayate in 2026.
- Madison Gate Records: A music record label of SPE founded in 2010 specializing in soundtracks and other recordings derived from feature films, television series and other media.
- Peanuts Holdings: A joint venture with Sony Music Entertainment Japan, together owning 80%, and the estate of Peanuts creator Charles M. Schulz, owning 20%. SPE and SMEJ jointly acquired 41% from WildBrain in 2026.
  - Peanuts Worldwide: A licensing and management subsidiary of Peanuts Worldwide established in 2010 to oversee the Peanuts brand following the acquisition of the related assets from United Media by Iconix Brand Group.
- Pixomondo (PXO): An international visual effects and virtual production studio founded in 2001 by Thilo Kuther. SPE acquired the company in 2022.
- Sony Pictures Consumer Products: The consumer products division of SPE.
- Sony Pictures Cable Ventures, Inc.
- Columbia Pictures Corporation Limited: Offices located at The Brunel Building, 2 Canalside Walk, London, England
- Sony Pictures Interactive
- Sony Pictures Studios: The actual physical buildings, land and movie-making equipment properties in Culver City, California. Includes 22 sound stages, ranging in size from 7,600 to 43,000 square feet (700 to 4,000 m^{2})
- Sony Pictures Studios Post Production Facilities
- Worldwide Product Fulfillment
- Sony Pictures Experiences
  - Alamo Drafthouse Cinema

== Related Sony Pictures divisions ==
The following are other Sony Pictures divisions that are not subsidiaries of the California-based Sony Pictures Entertainment, but are instead subsidiaries of the main Tokyo-based Sony Group Corporation.

- Sony Pictures Entertainment Japan (SPEJ): Formerly RCA Columbia Pictures Co., Ltd.. The company plans, produces, manufactures, sells, imports, exports, leases, broadcasts and distributes movies, TV programs, videos and audio-visual software in Japan. The company website says it was established on February 10, 1984, predating Sony's acquisition of Columbia Pictures Entertainment by 5 years. SPEJ was formed in 1991 through the merger of Columbia TriStar Japan, RCA-Columbia Pictures Video Japan, and Japan International Enterprises. Based in Tokyo, Japan. The California-based Sony Pictures Entertainment holds a majority share of SPEJ.
  - Madhouse (joint venture with Nippon Television)
  - Music On! TV (co-owned with Sony Music Entertainment Japan)
- Sony Pictures Digital Productions Inc. (SPDP): Formerly Columbia TriStar Interactive, Sony Pictures Interactive Network and Sony Pictures Digital Entertainment. A subsidiary of Sony Group Corporation based in Japan founded in 1994 known for designing the Sony Pictures website.

== Notes ==
1. Sony Pictures Releasing became Sony Pictures's current film distributor in 1994.
