= Sony ESPN =

Indian former sports TV channel

- Country: India
- Broadcast area: Indian subcontinent
- Network: Sony Pictures Sports Network
- Headquarters: Mumbai, Maharashtra

Programming
- Languages: English; Telugu; Kannada; Malayalam; Tamil; Bengali; Hindi

Ownership
- Owner: ESPN Inc. (50%); Sony Pictures Networks India Pvt Ltd (50%)
- Sister channels: List: Sony TV Sony Max Sony Max 2 Sony SAB Sony Six Sony Mix Sony Aath AXN Sony BBC Earth Sony Yay Sony Pix Sony Ten Sony Wah Sony Pal Sony LIV Sony Marathi

History
- Launched: 8 April 2015; 10 years ago (as Sony Kix); 16 January 2016; 9 years ago (as Sony ESPN)
- Closed: 30 March 2020; 5 years ago
- Former names: Sony Kix (2015–2016)

Sony ESPN was an Indian pay television sports channel which was a joint venture between ESPN and Sony Pictures Networks. The channel targeted the Indian subcontinent including India, Nepal, Bangladesh and Sri Lanka. It was part of the Sony Sports Network group.

== History ==
The channel launched on 8 April 2015 as Sony Kix, coinciding with the 2015 Indian Premier League.

In October 2015, Multi Screen Media announced a partnership with ESPN International, which would include the rebranding of Sony Kix as Sony ESPN, and collaboration on digital properties (including partnerships with properties such as ESPNcricinfo). The venture returned the ESPN brand to Indian television for the first time since Star India rebranded its ESPN Star Sports channels as Star Sports in 2013. After 9 months, the channel changed its name to Sony ESPN on 15 January 2018 on the same day when the high-definition version of this channel was launched coinciding with the 2018 Australian Open.

On 18 July 2017, the channel became part of Sony Sports Network following SPN's acquisition of TEN Sports.

The channel was shut down on 30 March 2020. It has been replaced By Sony Ten 4 and Sony Ten 4 HD.
