= AXN (Indian TV channel) =

Indian pay television channel

- Country: India

Programming
- Picture format: 4:3 576i (SDTV 16:9); 1080i (HDTV 16:9)

Ownership
- Owner: Sony Pictures Networks
- Sister channels: Sony TV; Sony SAB; Sony Pal; Sony MAX; Sony MAX 2; Sony Aath; Sony Wah; Sony PIX; Sony BBC Earth; Sony LIV; Sony Sports Network; Sony Yay; Sony Marathi

History
- Launched: 8 January 1999; 27 years ago
- Closed: 30 June 2020; 6 years ago

AXN was an Indian pay television channel that was owned by Sony Pictures Networks. Founded through advertising and subscription fees, AXN primarily focused on action genre and reality programming. AXN was discontinued on 30 June 2020.

== History ==
AXN launched in the Indian subcontinent on 8 January 1999 as a flagship feed of AXN Asia. During the channel's early years it operated as a genre-based network, airing mainly action films, action programmes, action animation and action sports.

Facing tough competition from rival networks Zee Café and Star World and a precipitous decline in the international syndication market for fictional action series and films, the channel shifted in mid-2005 by gradually incorporating more and more drama and comedy based programs into its schedule in order to attract more viewers and replicate the success shows such as Friends (comedy) and Law & Order (drama) had found on other channels. Big acquisitions included 24 and the CSI franchise.

The channel's high-definition feed was launched on 6 April 2015, which carried the same schedule as the SD feed but with different commercials.

=== Rebranding ===
The channel underwent a rebranding on 24 January 2016 with the addition of the slogan Live R.E.D standing for Reality, Entertainment and Drama. During the premiering Billions with this transformation, the channel sought to further diversify its portfolio away from its action genre by airing action shows with more intense, smart and unexpected characters.

To further its mission of diversification, the channel forged a multi-year deal with CBS Studios in July 2014, acquiring exclusive broadcast rights to the network's shows in India. The acquisition of the critically acclaimed Hulu original series The Handmaid's Tale for first airing in India also helped greatly in attracting more viewers for the channel and advertising the channel's content.

== Closure ==
The channel's viewership began to gradually decline since early 2019, post the implementation of the new tariff order (NTO) by the Telecom Regulatory Authority of India which mandated that channels should not be bundled in packs, leading to a sharp fall in demand for niche channels.

Consequently, on 1 June 2020 Sony Pictures Networks India announced that effective from 30 June 2020 AXN would cease all operations in India for both its SD and HD feeds, with the majority of its programming moving to Sony's SVOD service, Sony Liv, thus ending the channel's existence of 21 years.

Fall in ad revenue during the COVID-19 pandemic and further decline in viewership due to the advent of SVOD platforms in India were also cited as reasons behind the channel's closure.

== Programming ==
AXN primarily aired shows from the U.S. and U.K. (including selected shows produced/distributed by Sony Pictures Television). The following is a list of programming broadcast by the network:

Action drama simple:Early Edition

=== Anime ===
- Curious Play
- Gunsmith Cats
- Ninku
- You're Under Arrest

=== Comedy-drama ===
- BrainDead
- Californication
- Chuck
- Limitless
- Nurse Jackie
- Sex and the City

=== Drama ===
- 24
- The Agency
- Alias
- Billions
- Blue Bloods
- Boomtown
- The Brave
- Breaking Bad
- Bull
- Charlie's Angels
- CHOSEN
- Crouching Tiger, Hidden Dragon
- CSI
- CSI: Cyber
- CSI: Miami
- CSI: NY
- Camelot
- Damages
- Dexter
- Doubt
- Elementary
- The Firm
- Gossip Girl
- The Handmaid's Tale
- Hannibal
- Hawaii Five-0
- House MD
- Incorporated
- Justified
- Leverage
- MacGyver
- Madam Secretary
- NCIS
- NCIS: Los Angeles
- NCIS: New Orleans
- Nip/Tuck
- NUMB3RS
- Penny Dreadful
- Ray Donovan
- Reckless
- Salvation
- Scorpion
- Seven Types of Ambiguity
- Sheena
- The Shield
- Sherlock
- Supernatural
- Teen Wolf
- Undercover
- Vikings
- V.I.P.
- The Voice
- You
- Zoo

=== Reality ===
- 30 Seconds to Fame
- 101 Ways to Leave a Gameshow
- The Amazing Race
- American Ninja Warrior
- The Apprentice Asia
- Are You Hot?
- The Bachelor: Australia
- Breaking the Magician's Code: Magic's Biggest Secrets Finally Revealed
- Britain's Next Top Model
- The Contender
- Criss Angel Mindfreak
- Destination Truth
- The Duke
- Face Off
- Fear Factor
- Flipping Out
- Genius Junior
- Ghost Hunters
- Scariest Places on Earth
- The Glee Project
- Little Big Shots
- Guinness World Records Gone Wild
- Guinness World Records Primetime
- The Hero
- The Immortal
- Minute to Win It
- The Real Housewives of New York City
- Ripley's Believe It or Not!
- So You Think You Can Dance
- Survivor
- Top Chef
- Top Gear
- Total Blackout
- Total Wipeout
- Twinning
- Who Dares Wins
- Wild On!
- Wipeout
- The Wright Stuff

=== Science fiction ===
- The 4400
- 7 Days
- Andromeda
- Beauty & the Beast
- Caprica
- Delete
- Earth: Final Conflict
- The End of the World
- Extant
- Falling Skies
- Now and Again
- Orphan Black
- Tremors
- Under the Dome
