= Savitrijoti =

Marathi-language biopic series

- Genre: Biopic
- Directed by: Mahesh Tilekar
- Starring: See below
- Country of origin: India
- Original language: Marathi
- No. of episodes: 205

Production
- Producer: Nitin Vaidya
- Production locations: Mumbai, Maharashtra, India
- Camera setup: Multi-camera
- Running time: 22 minutes
- Production company: Dashami Creation

Original release
- Network: Sony Marathi
- Release: 6 January – 26 December 2020

Savitrijoti is an Indian Marathi language biopic TV series which aired on Sony Marathi. It starred Omkar Govardhan and Ashwini Kasar in lead roles. It is directed by Mahesh Tilekar and produced by Nitin Vaidya under the banner of Dashami Creation. It premiered from 6 January 2020 and ended on 26 December 2020 completing 205 episodes.

== Plot ==
This is a biopic based on the life of great reformist couple Savitribai Phule and Mahatma Jotiba Phule. Both the Indian leaders had a very strong individual identity and we have always known their work and contribution individually.

== Cast ==
- Omkar Govardhan
- Ashwini Kasar
- Samarth Patil
- Manoj Kolhatkar
- Vivek Gore
- Vinay Hake
- Pooja Nayak
- Jitendra Pol
- Ratnakar Nadkarni
