= Ravi Ahuja =

American business executive

- Citizenship: United States
- Education: University of Pennsylvania, Wharton School (BS, MBA)
- Occupation: Business executive
- Title: Chairman and CEO, Sony Pictures Entertainment
- Term: January 2025–present
- Predecessor: Tony Vinciquerra

Ravi Ahuja (born 1971) is an American business executive, who has been Chairman and Chief Executive Officer (CEO) of Sony Pictures Entertainment (SPE) since January 2025.

Ahuja previously held senior roles at Walt Disney Television, Fox Networks Group, and Virgin Entertainment Group.

== Career ==
Before joining the entertainment industry, Ahuja worked in investment banking and at McKinsey & Company. In 1999, he joined Virgin Entertainment Group, where he later served as Chief Financial Officer.

=== Fox Networks Group ===
In 2007, Ahuja joined Fox Networks Group and in 2016 he became the company's CFO, overseeing finance, business development, and strategy for divisions including Fox Broadcasting, Fox Sports, FX, National Geographic, and regional networks across Europe, Latin America, and Asia.

During his 12 years at Fox, Ahuja helped lead the company’s Hulu joint venture for more than a decade and oversaw investments in companies including Roku and DraftKings. Ahuja also led the acquisitions of National Geographic Partners, Yankees Entertainment, Sports Network and Sports Time Ohio.

=== Walt Disney Television ===
Following The Walt Disney Company's acquisition of 21st Century Fox in 2019, Ahuja was named President of Business Operations and CFO of Walt Disney Television, which encompassed ABC, ABC News, ABC-owned television stations, Disney Channel, Disney Television Studios, Freeform, FX, Hulu Originals and National Geographic.

He was part of the leadership team responsible for integrating Disney/ABC Television and Fox Networks. Ahuja left Disney in November 2020.

=== Sony Pictures Entertainment ===
==== Sony Pictures Television (2021–2024) ====
Ahuja joined SPE in March 2021 as Chairman of Global Television Studios. During that time, he led the acquisition of UK-based production company Bad Wolf in December 2021, and of Industrial Media, producer of shows including American Idol, 90 Day Fiancé and So You Think You Can Dance, in March 2022. Ahuja also oversaw the sale of mobile games unit GSN Mobile Games to Scopely in October 2021. Crunchyroll, also acquired by SPE in 2021, has grown to more than 21 million subscribers as of May 2026.

In March 2024, he was promoted to President and COO of SPE. In this capacity, he oversaw day-to-day operations and the entire production slate of Sony Pictures Television, including US and international production, nonfiction, kids programming, game shows, and the studio’s India business. Ahuja also established the Sony Pictures Experiences division that year following the acquisition of Alamo Drafthouse Cinema in June 2024.

==== CEO of Sony Pictures (2025–present) ====
In October 2024, Ahuja was announced as the new President and CEO of SPE, succeeding Tony Vinciquerra, a role he took on from January 2025. As CEO, he is responsible for the full scope of SPE's film and television businesses.

In December 2025, Ahuja oversaw Sony’s acquisition of a majority stake in the Peanuts franchise with Sony Music Entertainment Japan. He also spearheaded in June 2026 SPE’s investment in immersive theatrical company Cosm, where he holds a board seat.

In August 2026, SPE entered an agreement to restore and reopen the Cinerama Dome in Los Angeles, which Ahuja described as “a great way to expand the company’s brand without mega M&A”.

Ahuja served on the Roku board of directors since 2013, resigning in March 2025 to focus fully on his expanded role at SPE.

== Philanthropy ==
Ahuja has supported several charitable causes, including cancer research. In 2025, he served as a featured supporter and recipient of the Gil Nickel Humanitarian Award at UCLA Health's Taste for a Cure, a fundraising event for cancer research. He serves on the Board of Directors of UCLA Jonsson Cancer Center Foundation.

== Personal life ==
Ahuja holds a Bachelor of Science in economics and an MBA in strategic management from the Wharton School of the University of Pennsylvania. In July 2023, he was appointed to Wharton's Undergraduate Executive Board, a position he still holds.
