= Tony Vinciquerra =

American film executive and CEO

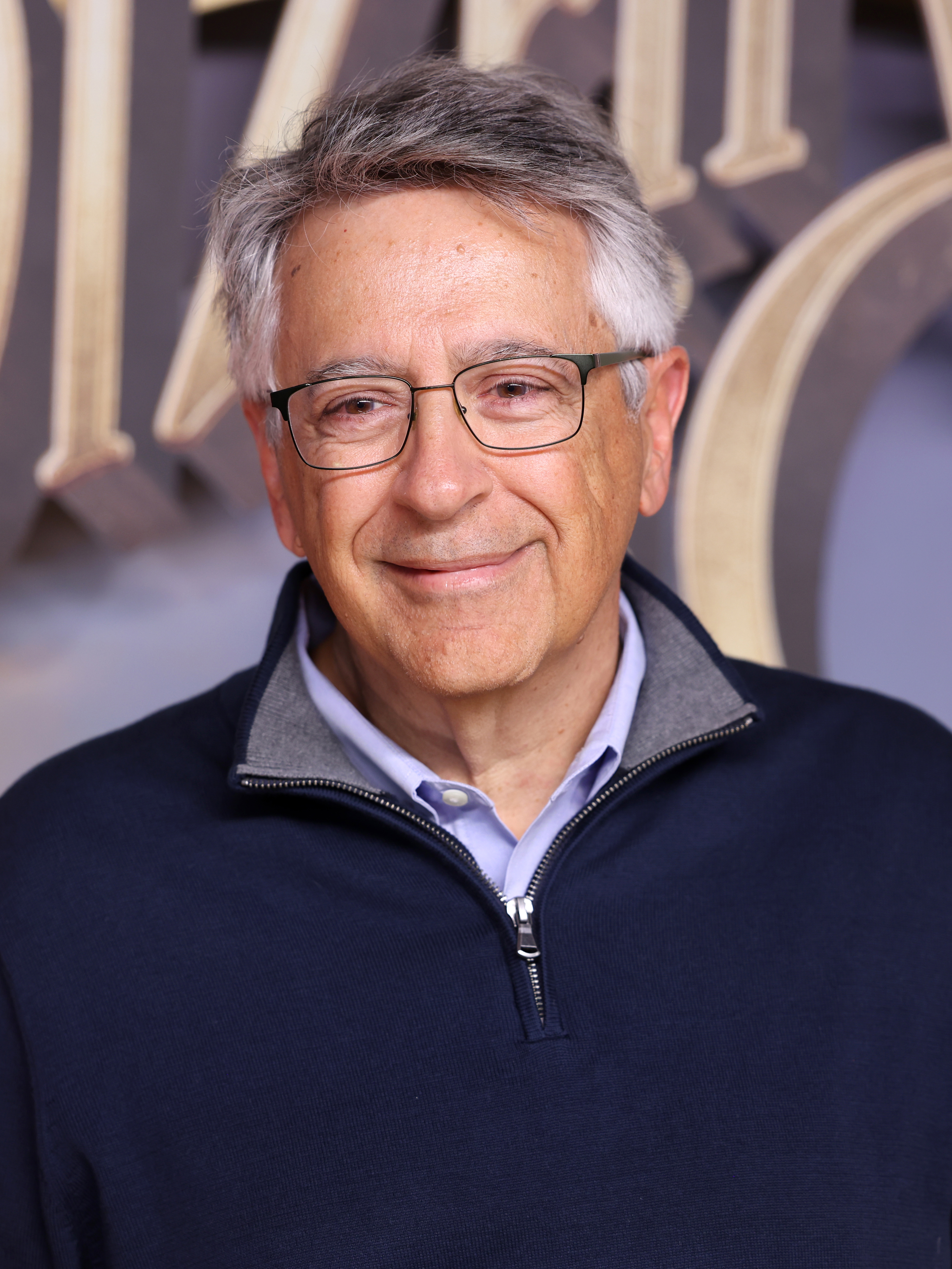
- Vinciquerra in 2025
- Born: Anthony Vinciquerra; 30 August 1954 (age 72); Albany, New York, US
- Education: University at Albany
- Occupations: Chairman, Sony Pictures Entertainment
- Spouse: Toni Knight (m. 2003; div. 2020)
- Children: 3

Anthony Vinciquerra (born August 30, 1954) is an American film executive who is the former chairman and CEO of Sony Pictures Entertainment from 2017 until 2025, until he was succeeded by Ravi Ahuja. He was previously president and CEO of Fox Networks Group.

== Early life ==
Vinciquerra was born in Albany, New York, and grew up with three sisters in a two-bedroom apartment. He performed various odd jobs in his youth, and began working in radio ad sales in college. He graduated from University at Albany in 1977.

== Career ==
=== CBS, Heart-Argyle, and Fox ===
Vinciquerra began his career in television broadcasting ad sales at local stations and later CBS, and was named COO of Hearst-Argyle Television in 1999. He joined Fox in December 2001 as president of the Fox Television Network. In 2002, he was named president and CEO of Fox Networks Group, which included Fox Cable Networks, Fox Broadcasting, Fox Sports, and Fox International Channels, and he was named chairman in 2008. After leaving Fox in 2011, he spent time as an entertainment consultant and advisor at TPG Capital.

In 2009, Vinciquerra was inducted into the Broadcasting and Cable Hall of Fame. He has sat on the boards of directors at Univision, Pandora Media, Motorola Mobility, DirecTV, and Qualcomm.

=== Sony Pictures Entertainment ===
In May 2017, it was announced that Vinciquerra would be filling the role of CEO of Sony Pictures Entertainment, left vacant by Michael Lynton after he announced his departure for Snap Inc. Vinciquerra was hired to oversee the Sony Pictures Motion Picture Group, Sony Pictures Television and worldwide media networks. During his time there, he has increased the amount of collaboration between Sony divisions like the motion picture group and Sony Interactive Entertainment, which resulted in the development of productions like Uncharted (2022), The Last of Us, and Twisted Metal. He is credited with reversing a downward trend of film box office performances and strengthening the television division, leading a “dramatic turnaround” with five consecutive years of increasing profit and record-high operating income for the company.

In his role overseeing Sony Pictures Television, Vinciquerra was involved in the hirings of Mike Richards and Mayim Bialik as co-hosts of the television quiz show Jeopardy! in 2021 after the death of longtime host Alex Trebek. Before any of his episodes aired, Richards stepped down from his position after several insensitive comments made on his podcast emerged. Vinciquerra helped manage the resumed host search, which concluded in July 2022 with deals for Bialik and Ken Jennings as the show's rotating co-hosts.

During the 2023 SAG-AFTRA and WGA strike, he lobbied for the Alliance of Motion Picture and Television Producers to de-escalate negotiations and resume talks with the unions. He also advocated for writers' unions to "come to a common ground" with production companies on the use of generative AI in film and television production. In 2025, Ravi Ahuja replaced Vinciquerra as CEO, though he remained as chairman until the end of the year.

== Personal life ==
In 2001, Vinciquerra moved to Los Angeles and met his wife, Toni Knight, an advertising executive who now owns her own firm. They have three children together. They divorced in 2020.
