= Sony Global Solutions =

Japanese information technology service management company

Sony Global Solutions Inc.
- Native name: ソニーグローバル ソリューションズ 株式会社
- Type: Subsidiary (K.K.)
- Industry: System integration Information security Computer software
- Founded: 1988; 38 years ago
- Headquarters: Tokyo, Japan
- Revenue: JPY 31.0 billion
- Total assets: JPY 100.0 million
- Number of employees: 625 (2017)
- Parent: Sony Group Corporation
- Website: sonyglobalsolutions.jp

Sony Global Solutions Inc. (ソニーグローバルソリューションズ株式会社, Sonī Gurōbaru Soryūshonzu Kabushiki-gaisha) is a Japanese information technology service management company headquartered in Tokyo, Japan.

== Overview ==
Originally, in 1988, Sony System Designs Inc. was established by Sony Corporation . In 2001, the company name changed to Sony Information System Solutions Inc.. In 2003, Sony Corporation acquired CIS Inc., then Sony Information System Solutions Inc. and CIS Inc. were merged, and the company name changed to Sony Global Solutions Inc.

The company offers the services of system integration, cloud computing, information security, and provides computer software mainly for Sony group.

Sony Global Solutions is known that the company collaborates other IT service companies, Accenture, NS Solutions, etc.

== See also ==
- List of companies of Japan
- List of Sony subsidiaries
