= Sony Movie Channel =

American television channel

Sony Movies
- Country: United States
- Broadcast area: Nationwide (USA); Canada (Rogers Cable)
- Headquarters: Culver City, California, United States

Programming
- Language: English

Ownership
- Owner: Sony Pictures Television Networks
- Parent: CPE US Networks, Inc.
- Sister channels: Game Show Network; Game Show Central; Crunchyroll Channel; Sony Cine; Great Entertainment Television

History
- Launched: 1 October 2010; 15 years ago
- Former names: Sony Movie Channel (2010–2021)

Links
- Website: www.sonymovies.com (US)

Availability

Streaming media
- FuboTV: Internet Protocol television
- Tiki Live: Internet Protocol television
- Philo: Internet Protocol television
- Vidgo: Internet Protocol television
- Klowd TV: Internet Protocol television

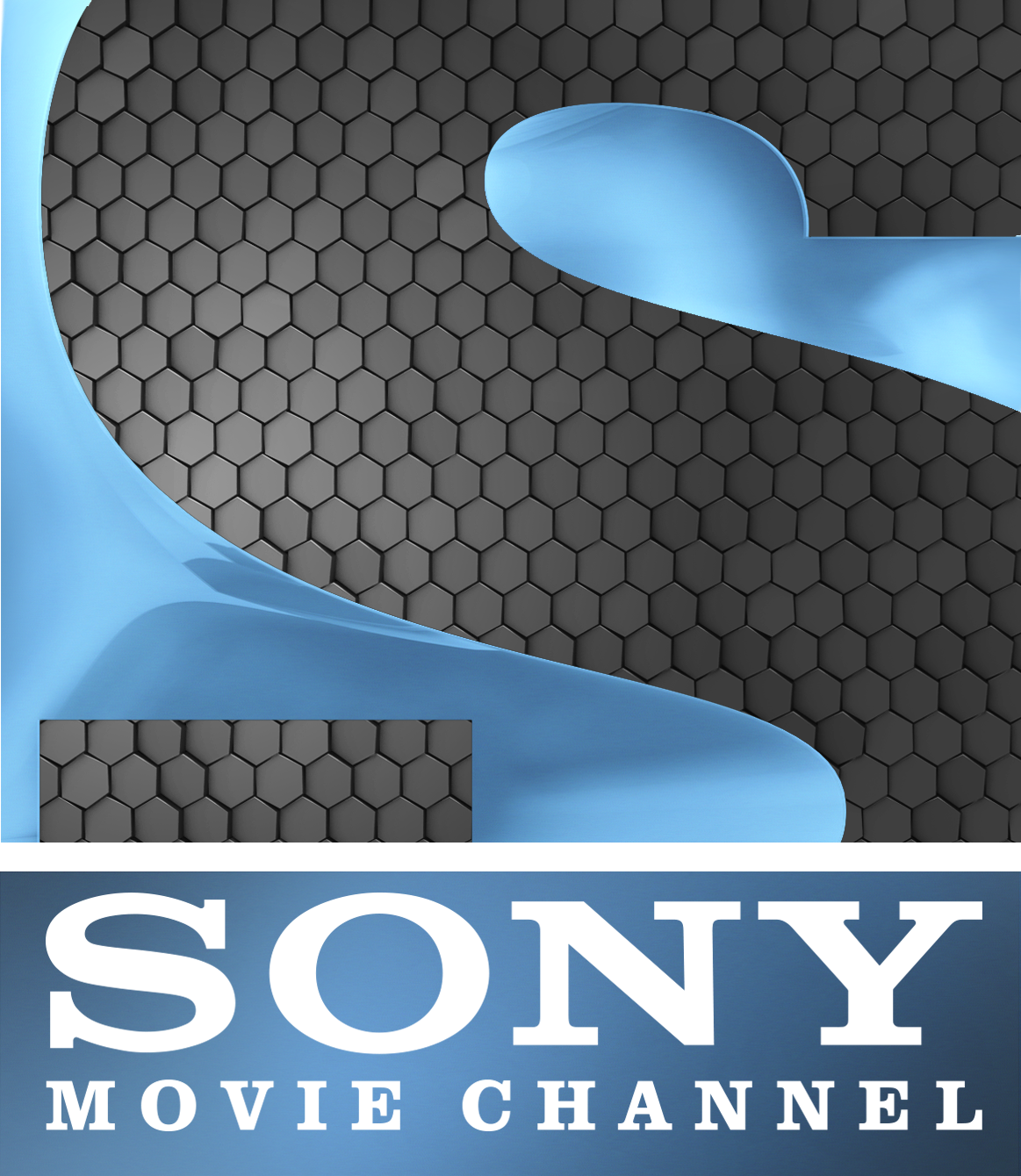
Former logo as Sony Movie Channel (2016–2021)

Sony Movies (formerly known as Sony Movie Channel) is an American cable television channel launched on October 1, 2010. Owned by the network television division of Sony Pictures Television, its programming consists of films from the Sony Pictures Entertainment library (including content from Columbia Pictures, TriStar Pictures, Screen Gems, Sony Pictures Releasing, Sony Pictures Classics, Sony Pictures Animation and Destination Films among others), alongside films from other distributors, mainly from Millennium Films, Millennium Media, Lionsgate Films and Shout! Factory, which are broadcast unedited, and remastered in 1080i high definition.

== Program blocks, theme weeks, and Other services ==
Program blocks

A former program block on the channel is "Killer Mandays", a double feature of horror films on Monday nights.

Theme weeks

From November 6 – 12, 2011 the channel aired a week-long salute to Bollywood films.

Other services

=== Sony Cine ===
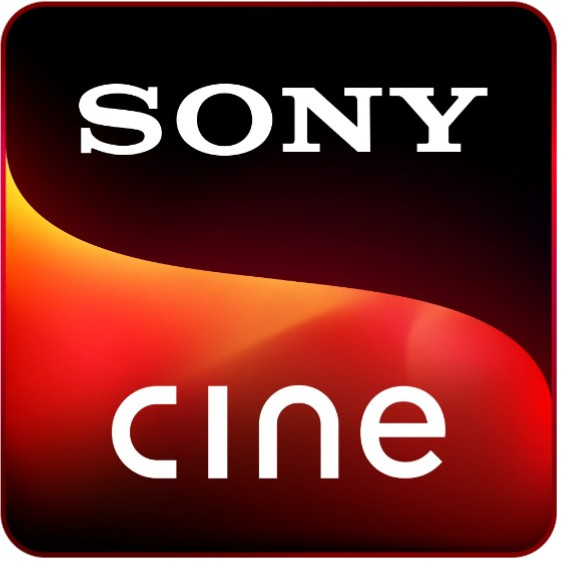
Logo used since 2021

Sony Cine is an American Spanish-language television channel that is the same as its English counterpart but in Spanish. The channel launched in 2012.

== Availability ==
Sony Movies is available nationally on Philo, DirecTV and Dish Network, and regionally on AT&T U-Verse, Suddenlink (now Optimum), Optimum. DirecTV and Dish Network also offer "Sony Movie Channel Everywhere", which allows viewers to watch its movies through its website for no additional cost. The channel is also available through streaming for owners of the Sony Network Media Player.
