= Sony Entertainment =

Umbrella entertainment division of Sony

Sony Entertainment, Inc.
- Type: Division
- Industry: Entertainment
- Founded: 2012; 14 years ago
- Defunct: 2019; 7 years ago
- Fate: Dissolved; its subsidiaries transferred directly to the main Sony company
- Headquarters: New York City, New York, United States
- Area served: Worldwide
- Products: Music; Film; Television
- Number of employees: 18,000
- Parent: Sony Corporation of America
- Subsidiaries: Sony Music Entertainment; Sony/ATV Music Publishing; Sony Pictures Entertainment

Sony Entertainment, Inc. was the umbrella entertainment division of Japanese multinational conglomerate Sony Corporation from 2012 to 2019, overseeing Sony's film, television, and music businesses.

== History ==
On March 30, 2012, then-co-chairman and CEO of Sony Pictures Entertainment, Michael Lynton, and executive vice president and general counsel of Sony, Nicole Seligman, were respectively named as CEO and president of Sony Corporation of America to oversee all of Sony's global entertainment businesses. On April 9, 2013, Lynton renewed his contract with Sony and was elevated to the presidency at Sony Entertainment.

On February 18, 2016, Seligman resigned after a decade and half with the company but remained there until March 31.

On January 13, 2017, Lynton announced that he was stepping down as CEO of Sony Entertainment and Sony Pictures and chairman of the latter to become chairman for Snap Inc. and was later replaced by Sony Pictures chairman and CEO Anthony Vinciquerra on 11 May 2017.

News outlets including The New York Post, Complete Music Update and TheStreet reported on December 19, 2016, about Sony was considering a restructuring of its American operations by merging Sony Pictures with Sony Interactive Entertainment which would have placed Sony Pictures under Sony Interactive's then-CEO, Andrew House, though House wouldn't have taken over day-to-day operations of Sony Pictures. However, a Sony spokesperson denounced any sort of planned merger or restructuring of any of the Sony media divisions at that time in an interview with the latter source.

Sony Music Entertainment and Sony/ATV Music Publishing consolidated under Sony Music Group in 2019, which was assigned as a subsidiary of Sony Corporation of America alongside Sony Pictures, dissolving the unit completely.

== Subsidiaries ==
- Sony Pictures Entertainment
- Sony Music Entertainment
- Sony/ATV Music Publishing

=== Other divisions ===
Other Sony entertainment umbrellas are Sony Interactive Entertainment and their PlayStation Studios, which have a presence on numerous platforms. Across all of Sony's electronics and the PlayStation brand, and is extremely diversified across Apple iOS, Android, Microsoft Windows, Nintendo Switch, Steam, and Xbox. This includes the apps for their streaming services such as Crunchyroll (including Funimation), Great American Pure Flix (with Great American Media), Sony Pictures Core (formerly Bravia Core), and India's SonyLIV.

Sony Music Entertainment Japan and its subsidiaries, including Aniplex, operate independently of the US-based Sony Entertainment.
