= Sony Pictures Networks =

Indian media company

Sony Pictures Networks India Private Limited
- Logo used since 2026
- Formerly: Sony Entertainment Television India Private Limited (1995–2007); Multi Screen Media Private Limited (2007–2015); Sony Pictures Networks India Private Limited (2015–2022); Culver Max Entertainment Private Limited (2022–2026)
- Type: Subsidiary
- Founded: 30 September 1995; 31 years ago
- Headquarters: India
- Area served: Indian subcontinent
- Key people: Gaurav Banerjee (MD & CEO); Sibaji Biswas (CFO); Ritesh Khosla (General Counsel)
- Number of employees: 1,200
- Parent: Sony Pictures
- Website: www.sonypicturesnetworks.com/home

Sony Pictures Networks India Private Limited (SPN or SPNI) is an Indian media conglomerate owned by Sony Pictures.

SPN manages and operates 30 television channels, the streaming media platform SonyLIV, as well as the television studio Studio NEXT and film studio Sony Pictures Networks Productions.

== History ==
It was founded on 30 September 1995 as Sony Entertainment Television India Private Limited (SET India Pvt Ltd.). The first channel from the company was Sony Entertainment Television.

In 1999, SET India Pvt Ltd., launched its second channel Sony Max which broadcast Hindi movies and sports events along with Sony Entertainment Television. In 2005, SET India Network bought SAB TV from Sri Adhikari Brothers and rebranded as Sony SAB. In 2006 SET India launched the English movie channel Sony Pix.

In December 2007, SET India Private Limited was renamed as Multi Screen Media Private Limited.

In December 2015, the company was renamed as Sony Pictures Networks India (SPN).

On 24 October 2022, nearly all of Sony's networks underwent a rebranding coinciding with Diwali, replacing the cropped "S" logo used by SET since its launch with the S-curve logo template used by Sony's television networks worldwide since 2019, and first used locally by SonyLIV.

=== Attempted merger with Zee ===
On 22 September 2021, Zee Entertainment Enterprises announced that it had reached an agreement in principle to merge its television networks, production operations, digital assets, and program libraries with SPN; the combined company would be majority-owned by Sony, and led by Zee CEO Punit Goenka. On 21 December 2021, the two companies reached a definitive agreement to merge; it was stated that the combined company "should be well-positioned to meet the growing consumer demand for premium content across entertainment touchpoints and platform[s]." Under the agreement, Sony will hold a 51% stake in the combined company, and inherit Zee's public listing on the Bombay Stock Exchange. The companies set a two-year deadline of 21 December 2023 to complete the merger, with a one-month grace period ending 20 January 2024.

In 2022, SPN changed its corporate name to Culver Max Entertainment Pvt. Ltd.; the name is used exclusively by the holding company, which continues to otherwise do business as Sony Pictures Networks. In October 2022, the merger was approved by the Competition Commission of India (CCI); it was reported that Zee had voluntarily agreed to divest or shut down one general entertainment channel as a condition of the approval.

In June 2023, the Securities and Exchange Board of India (SEBI) prohibited Goenka from holding directorial positions in any listed company for one year, amid an investigation into allegations of insider trading; the action was considered to be a potential impediment to the closure of the merger, as he was expected to lead the combined company On 10 August 2023, the merger was approved by the National Company Law Tribunal (NCLT). In September 2023, Sony stated that the merger would be delayed for unspecified reasons. In November 2023, the SEBI lifted its ban on Goenka after an appeal.

On 9 January 2024, amid rumors that Sony was seeking to call off the merger, Zee issued a statement that it was still committed to completing the agreement, and called the reports "baseless". However, on 22 January 2024, Sony issued a notice to Zee effectively terminating the merger proceedings due to, among other reasons, the closing conditions to the merger not being satisfied by the given deadline of 21 January.

== Sports ==
The network forayed into the Indian sports TV market in 2002 after acquiring the media rights for International Cricket Council (ICC) matches from 2002 to 2007, which were broadcast on SET and Sony MAX.

SET / Sony MAX were known for animated Tiger sequences during the live TV match events of ICC Cricket World Cup 2003 - 2007 & ICC Champions Trophy 2006, for example Tiger do Bangra dance when batter hits a six. Sony Max referred the animation as the Deewana Tiger (Mascot) for the channel.

The animation was the brainchild of Vivekananda Roy Ghatak & it was created by 2NZAnimation for the Sony Max.

In 2008, along with Singapore-based World Sport Group, it won the broadcast rights for the IPL for 10 years. In April 2012, it launched its first sports channel Sony Six. In August 2016, SPN acquired the Ten Sports networks from Zee Entertainment Enterprises for $385 million, with the networks rebranded in 2017 under the "Sony TEN" brand, and integrated with Sony Six and Sony ESPN.

== General entertainment ==
In the widespread entertainment category, Sony Entertainment Television (SET) and Sony SAB are the network's premier channels. Offering content from SET and Sony SAB is Sony Pal, a channel targeted towards rural Hindi-speaking markets. Sony YAY! is a kids’ entertainment channel that airs several shows in regional languages.

The network also has a joint venture with BBC Earth to showcase non-fictional programming via Sony BBC Earth.

In 1997, Sony Pictures Network Launched AXN (Indian TV channel) for broadcasting English based Television shows. Any some how, due to content delivery issue with International broadcaster the shutdown in 2020.

== Owned channels ==
=== On air channels ===
Channel	Launched	Language	Category	SD/HD	Notes
Sony Entertainment Television	1995	Hindi	General Entertainment	SD+HD	
Sony SAB	1999	Hindi	General Entertainment	SD+HD	Formerly SAB TV
Sony Pal	2014	Hindi	General Entertainment	SD	
Sony Kal	2022	Hindi	General Entertainment	SD	Available in USA & Canada only
Sony Max	1999	Hindi	Movies	SD+HD	
Sony Max 1	2025	Hindi	Movies	SD	
Sony Max 2	2014	Hindi	Movies	SD	
Sony Wah	2016	Hindi	Movies	SD	
Sony Sports Ten 3 Hindi	2010	Hindi	Sports	SD+HD	Formerly Sony Ten 3
Sony Pix	2006	English	Movies	SD+HD	
Sony Sports Ten 1	2002	English	Sports	SD+HD	Formerly Sony Ten 1
Sony Sports Ten 2	2006	English	Sports	SD+HD	Formerly Sony Ten 2
Sony Sports Ten 5	2012	English	Sports	SD+HD	Formerly Sony Six
Sony BBC Earth	2017	English; Hindi; Tamil; Telugu	Infotainment	SD+HD	Joint venture with BBC Studios
Sony YAY!	2017	Hindi; Tamil; Telugu; Bengali; Kannada; Marathi; Malayalam; Odia	Kids	SD	Formerly Animax
Sony AATH	2009	Bengali	General Entertainment	SD	Formerly Channel 8
Sony Marathi	2018	Marathi	General Entertainment	SD	
Sony Vizha	2026	Tamil	General Entertainment	SD+HD	
Sony Sports Ten 4 Tamil	2025	Tamil	Sports	SD	Formerly Sony Ten 4
Sony Sports Ten 4 Telugu	2025	Telugu	Sports	SD	Formerly Sony Ten 4 HD
Sony Sports Ten 4 Kannada	2026	Kannada	Sports	SD	

=== Defunct channels ===
Channel	Launched	Defunct	Language	Category	Video Format	Notes
Sony Mix	2011	2020	Hindi	Music	SD	
Sony Rox HD	2017	2018	Hindi	Music	HD	
Sony Ten 3	2016	2022	Hindi	Sports	SD+HD	Rebranded as Sony Sports TEN 3
Ten Cricket	2010	2016	Hindi	Sports	SD+HD	Rebranded as Sony Ten 3
Ten Action	2010	2016	English	Sports	SD+HD	Rebranded as Sony Ten 2
Ten Sports	2010	2016	English	Sports	SD+HD	Rebranded as Sony Ten 1
AXN	1999	2020	English	General Entertainment	SD+HD	
Sony Le Plex HD	2016	2018	English	Movies	HD	
Animax	2004	2017	English	Kids	SD	Replaced by Sony Yay
Sony Ten 1	2002	2022	English	Sports	SD+HD	Rebranded as Sony Sports TEN 1
Sony Ten 2	2016	2022	English	Sports	SD+HD	Rebranded as Sony Sports TEN 2
Sony Six	2012	2022	English	Sports	SD+HD	Rebranded as Sony Sports TEN 5
Sony Kix	2015	2016	English; Hindi	Sports	SD	Rebranded as Sony ESPN
Sony ESPN	2016	2020	English; Hindi; Tamil; Telugu; Bengali; Kannada; Malayalam	Sports	SD+HD	Joint venture by ESPN Inc.
Sony Ten Golf HD	2015	2018	English; Hindi	Sports	HD	Formerly Ten Golf HD
Sony Ten 4	2021	2022	Tamil; Telugu	Sports	SD+HD	Rebranded as Sony Sports TEN 4

== Streaming platform ==
In January 2013, the network forayed into video-on-demand with the launch of its OTT platform, SonyLIV. Its library consists of content from the network's channels in India such as SET and Sony SAB, alongside originals such as, Gullak, LIV Shout Out and Holycross. Apart from archival and regional content, movie premieres, short films and LIVE sports are also a part of SonyLIV's offerings.

The platform has crossed 109 million app downloads.

== Movies ==
Sony MAX, Sony MAX1 and Sony MAX2 offer Hindi cinema to viewers. Sony MAX showcases world premieres, while Sony MAX HD focuses to Indian viewers who prefer a high definition viewing experience. Sony MAX1 and Sony MAX2 caters to viewers who appreciate evergreen Indian cinema.Alongside these, the network offers Sony PIX basing its programming on Hollywood films and Sony WAH.

== Studio NEXT ==
An independent business unit of SPNI, Studio NEXT creates original content and IPs for television and digital media within India and globally. The venture began its journey by producing the debutant season of Kus Bani Koshur Karorpaet, the Kashmiri adaptation of Who Wants to Be a Millionaire? but like other vernacular Indian adaptations, structured more in line with Indian flagship, national adaptation in Kaun Banega Crorepati. (Note: Although season 10 of KBC was reported to be co-produced with the legacy, pre-existing production company BIG Synergy by at least 2 sources, the contract-documents from the company noted only the latter [as the producing-entity], as has been the case for preceding seasons. Nevertheless, it remained uncredited on-screen. Thereby, making Kus Bani Koshur Karorpaet their first-ever credited project.) Going forward, Studio NEXT will continue to produce new IPs whilst leveraging the existing ones under Sony Entertainment ownership.

== Corporate social responsibility ==
'Ek India Happywala' is the call-to-action under which the network guides its contribution towards society. To create change in society, it focuses on 3 impact areas - Environment, Education and Empowerment.

The network associates itself with several NGOs such as Krida Vikas Sanstha, Cricket Association for the Blind of Maharashtra (CABM) and ConnectEd Technologies to name a few, and undertakes initiatives such as providing clean drinking water to drought-affected areas in Maharashtra and supporting upcoming Indian athletes with equipment and training required to compete at international events among a few.

== See also ==
- Sony India
- Sony Sports Network
- Sony Pictures
- Sony Pictures Television
- Sony
