= Sony Marathi =

Indian Marathi language TV channel

- Country: India
- Headquarters: Mumbai, Maharashtra

Programming
- Language: Marathi
- Picture format: 576i (SDTV)

Ownership
- Owner: Sony
- Parent: Sony Pictures Networks
- Sister channels: SET; Sony SAB; Sony Max; Sony Max 2 Sony Sports Network; Sony Aath; Sony BBC Earth; Sony Pix; Sony Wah; Sony Pal; Sony Yay

History
- Launched: 19 August 2018

Links
- Website: sonymarathi.com

Availability

Streaming media
- SonyLIV: Watch Sony Marathi Live

Sony Marathi is an Indian pay television channel that broadcasts programming in Marathi. It was launched on 19 August 2018 and is owned and operated by Sony Pictures Networks.

== Current broadcast ==
=== Reality shows ===
| Premiere date | Series |
|---|---|
| 22 August 2018 | Maharashtrachi Hasyajatra Season 20 |
| 12 October 2026 | Kon Honar Crorepati Season 5 |

=== Dubbed series ===
| Premiere date | Series |
|---|---|
| 6 July 2026 | Punyashlok Ahilyabai |
| 26 October 2026 | Crime Patrol Marathi |
| 2 November 2026 | Hastinapurche Veer |

== Former broadcast ==
=== Drama series ===
| Premiere date | Series | Last aired | Ref. |
|---|---|---|---|
| 20 August 2018 | Saare Tujhyachsathi | 28 September 2019 | |
| 22 August 2018 | H.M. Bane T.M. Bane | 22 October 2020 | |
| 19 August 2019 | Swarajyajanani Jijamata | 3 October 2021 | |
| 6 January 2020 | Savitrijoti | 26 December 2020 | |
| 14 September 2020 | Aai Majhi Kalubai | 15 August 2021 | |
| 26 October 2020 | Shreemantagharchi Suun | 10 July 2021 | |
| 21 June 2021 | Gatha Navnathanchi | 4 January 2025 | |
| 12 July 2021 | Ajunahi Barsaat Aahe | 12 March 2022 | |
| 27 September 2021 | Dnyaneshwar Mauli | 18 June 2023 | |
| 4 October 2021 | Tumchya Aamchyatali Kusum | 26 February 2022 | |
| 15 November 2021 | Swarajya Saudamini Tararani | 16 July 2022 | |
| 20 December 2021 | Tumchi Mulgi Kay Karte? | 15 January 2023 | |
| 28 February 2022 | Boss Majhi Ladachi | 24 September 2022 | |
| 18 July 2022 | Jivachi Hotiya Kahili | 15 July 2023 | |
| 12 September 2022 | Chotya Bayochi Mothi Swapna | 4 January 2025 | |
| 16 January 2023 | Pratishodh - Jhunj Astitavachi | 5 July 2024 | |
| 1 May 2023 | Karan Gunhyala Mafi Nahi | 20 September 2024 | |
| 19 June 2023 | Tuja Maja Sapan – Premacha Tufan | 21 September 2024 | |
| 17 July 2023 | Abol Pritichi Ajab Kahani | 21 September 2024 | |
| 15 January 2024 | Nivedita Majhi Taai | 20 September 2024 | |
| 8 May 2024 | Jai Jai Shanidev | 26 July 2024 | |
| 10 June 2024 | Bhoomikanya – Saad Ghalte Nisargraja | 21 September 2024 | |
| 8 July 2024 | Tu Bhetashi Navyane | 13 December 2024 | |

=== Non-fiction shows ===
| Premiere date | Series | Last aired |
|---|---|---|
| 27 May 2019 | Kon Honar Crorepati Season 1 | 15 August 2019 |
| 21 August 2020 | Singing Star | 22 November 2020 |
| 30 November 2020 | Maharashtra's Best Dancer | 14 March 2021 |
| 12 July 2021 | Kon Honar Crorepati Season 2 | 18 September 2021 |
| 22 November 2021 | Indian Idol Marathi | 20 April 2022 |
| 6 June 2022 | Kon Honar Crorepati Season 3 | 13 August 2022 |
| 29 May 2023 | Kon Honar Crorepati Season 4 | 12 August 2023 |
| 1 April 2025 | Kon Honar Maharashtracha Ladka Kirtankar | 6 July 2025 |
| 5 May 2025 | Aaj Kay Banvuya? Madhura Special | 26 June 2026 |

=== Dubbed series ===
| Premiere date | Series | Last aired |
|---|---|---|
| 23 August 2019 | Sankat Mochan Mahabali Hanumaan | 31 March 2020 |
| 7 November 2024 | Aahat | 21 December 2025 |
| 7 November 2024 | CID | 27 July 2025 |
| 7 December 2024 | Gopal Bhau | 30 March 2025 |
| 16 December 2024 | Bebhan Prem He | 8 February 2025 |
| 6 January 2025 | Maze Sai – Shraddha Ani Saburi | 25 April 2025 |
| 28 July 2025 | Shrimad Ramayan | 21 November 2025 |
| 8 September 2025 | Waglechi Duniya | 28 November 2025 |
| 9 March 2026 | Veer Hanuman | 17 April 2026 |
| 29 June 2026 | Vashikaranam | 10 September 2026 |
