= Sony Sports Network =

Indian sports television network

- Type: Sports
- Country: India
- Broadcast area: Nationwide
- Network: Sony Pictures Networks India

Programming
- Languages: English; Hindi; Telugu; Malayalam; Tamil; Kannada
- Picture format: 1080i HDTV (downscaled to 576i 4:3 for SDTV simulcasts)

Ownership
- Parent: Sony Pictures Networks
- Sister channels: See List of channels owned by Sony Pictures Networks

History
- Launched: 1 April 2002; 24 years ago
- Founder: Abdul Rahman Bukhatir
- Former names: TEN SPORTS (2002-2017); SONY TEN (2017-2022); SONY SIX (2012-2022)

Links
- Website: sonysportsnetwork.com

The Sony Sports Network, also known as Sony TEN, is a group of Indian pay television sports channels owned by Sony Pictures Networks.

The original TEN Sports channel was first established on 1 April 2002 by Abdul Rahman Bukhatir. It was acquired by the Essel Group in 2010 and was added to Essel's existing Zee Sports channel, launched in 2005. After the acquisition, Zee launched two new channels, TEN Cricket and TEN Golf, and rebranded Zee Sports as TEN Action.

In August 2016, Sony Pictures Networks India acquired all of the sports channels under Zee from Essel. In 2017, the networks were formally merged with Sony's existing Sony ESPN and Sony Six channels as the Sony Pictures Sports Network, with the TEN channels rebranded as Sony TEN. The channels were then rebranded as the Sony Sports Network in October 2022, with all five channels now carrying the "Sony Sports Ten" prefix.

== History ==
In January 2001, Taj Television Ltd was formed in Dubai with Abdul Rahman Bukhatir as a backer. Bukhatir had various business interests and was known for transforming Sharjah as a major international cricket venue. The company launched the channel as TEN Sports (as part of its Taj Entertainment Network) on 1 April 2002. As of March 2004, the company was headed by Chris McDonald as the CEO and had 100 employees.

In June 2005, Zee Telefilms Limited launched Zee Sports, reportedly India's first private sports channel. Zee Telefilms acquired a 50% stake in TEN Sports for ₹800 crore (₹8,000,000,000) in 2006, and eventually acquired the remainder of its Indian operations in 2010. The sale did not include its Pakistani operations, which were retained by the Essel Group via its subsidiary, Tower Sports. In 2010, Zee rebranded Zee Sports as Ten Action which featured adventure sports and non-cricket content. In 2011, Zee launched a new channel called Ten Cricket, exclusively for cricket matches.

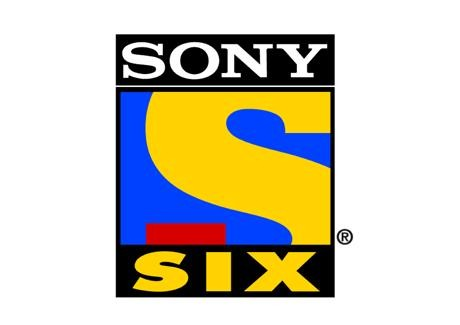
Former logo of Sony Six used from 2012-2017

In April 2012, Sony India, then called, Multi Screen Media (MSM) launched their sports entertainment channel, Sony Six. In January 2016, Sony launched two new sports channels, Sony ESPN and Sony ESPN HD, in collaboration with ESPN.

In March 2016, all channels in the Zee network were rebranded as Ten 1, Ten 2, and Ten 3 respectively.

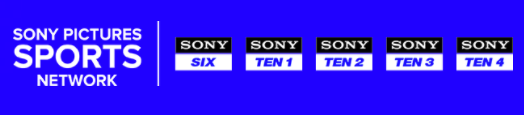
The former logos of the Sony Pictures Sports Network and its channels, used from 2017 to 2022

In August 2016, Sony Pictures Networks India announced its intent to acquire Zee's sports networks for US$385 million; the first phase of the sale, which included equity stakes in the holding companies Taj Television (India) Pvt Ltd and part of Taj TV Limited Mauritius, was completed in February 2017 for US$350 million. On 18 July 2017, all of Sony's sports channels in India were rebranded as Sony TEN, and the high-definition feeds of Sony TEN 2 and 3 were also launched. The remainder of the sale was completed in September 2017.

The networks, along with new sisters Sony Six and Sony ESPN, were branded under the umbrella name, Sony Pictures Sports Network and began to phase in a rebranding as Sony Sports in 2020. Sony ESPN was shut down on 30 March 2020.

In June 2021, Sony launched Sony TEN 4, which broadcasts in the Telugu and Tamil languages. Actor Rana Daggubati served as a promotional ambassador for the network's launch.

On 24 October 2022, the Sony Pictures Sports Network was rebranded as the Sony Sports Network, as part of a wider rebranding of all Sony Pictures Networks channels, under the versions of the global Sony television branding. Its channels were likewise rebranded under the new prefix Sony Sports Ten, and Sony Six was brought under the Ten branding for the first time as Sony Sports Ten 5.

On July 10, 2025, Sony Sports Ten 4, which previously broadcast content in multiple audio formats on both SD and HD feeds, underwent a rebranding. The HD feed was rebranded as Sony Sports Ten 4 Telugu, while the SD feed became Sony Sports Ten 4 Tamil. Also, Sony Sports Ten 3 (both SD and HD) was renamed Sony Sports Ten 3 Hindi (SD and HD), resulting in a total of four rebranded channels.

== Owned channels ==
=== Current Channels ===
The official logos of the Sony Pictures Sports Network's channels, used since 2022

==== Sony Sports Ten 1 ====
Sony Sports Ten 1 is an English-language channel that broadcasts events from the World Athletics Championships, Asian Games, Commonwealth Games and Sukma Games. Its programming schedule also consists of live coverage of tennis, rally, horse racing, beach volleyball events and basketball.

==== Sony Sports Ten 2 ====
Sony Sports Ten 2 is an English-language channel that broadcasts football matches from European football leagues such as Bundesliga, DFB-Pokal, UEFA Champions League, DFL-Supercup of Germany and MMA promotion Ultimate Fighting Championship (UFC) in English, Indian Super League(football).

==== Sony Sports Ten 3 Hindi ====
Sony Sports Ten 3 Hindi is a Hindi-language channel, available in SD and HD format, that airs cricket matches from the Asia Cup, Sri Lanka, New Zealand and England cricket boards. It also broadcasts football matches. and UFC matches in the Hindi language.

==== Sony Sports Ten 4 Tamil ====
Sony Sports Ten 4 Tamil is a Tamil-language channel launched on 10 July 2025. It broadcasts Sony Sports Programme in Tamil commentary.

==== Sony Sports Ten 4 Telugu ====
Sony Sports Ten 4 Telugu is a Telugu channel launched on 10 July 2025. It broadcasts Sony Sports Programme in Telugu commentary.

==== Sony Sports Ten 4 Kannada ====
Sony Sports Ten 4 Kannada is a Kannada channel launched on 1st April 2026. It broadcasts Sony Sports Programme in Kannada commentary.

==== Sony Sports Ten 5 ====
Sony Sports Ten 5 is an English-language channel originally launched as Sony Six in April 2012, before the acquisition of TEN. It has historically featured international cricket.

=== Former channels ===
==== Sony ESPN ====
Sony KIX was launched on 8 April 2015, by what is now Sony Pictures Networks India, it was the second sports television channel launched by the company after Sony Six. The channel was rebranded as Sony ESPN on 17 January 2016.

Sony ESPN logo

Sony and ESPN would partner together on website and app efforts, with ESPN providing and producing content such as cricket, football, tennis, basketball, badminton, field hockey, golf, rugby union, motorsport along with other events. Sony Six and Sony ESPN, which were launched before Sony's purchase of Ten, effectively became part of the group when the acquisition was completed. Sony ESPN was shut down on 31 March 2020.

==== Sony Ten Golf HD ====
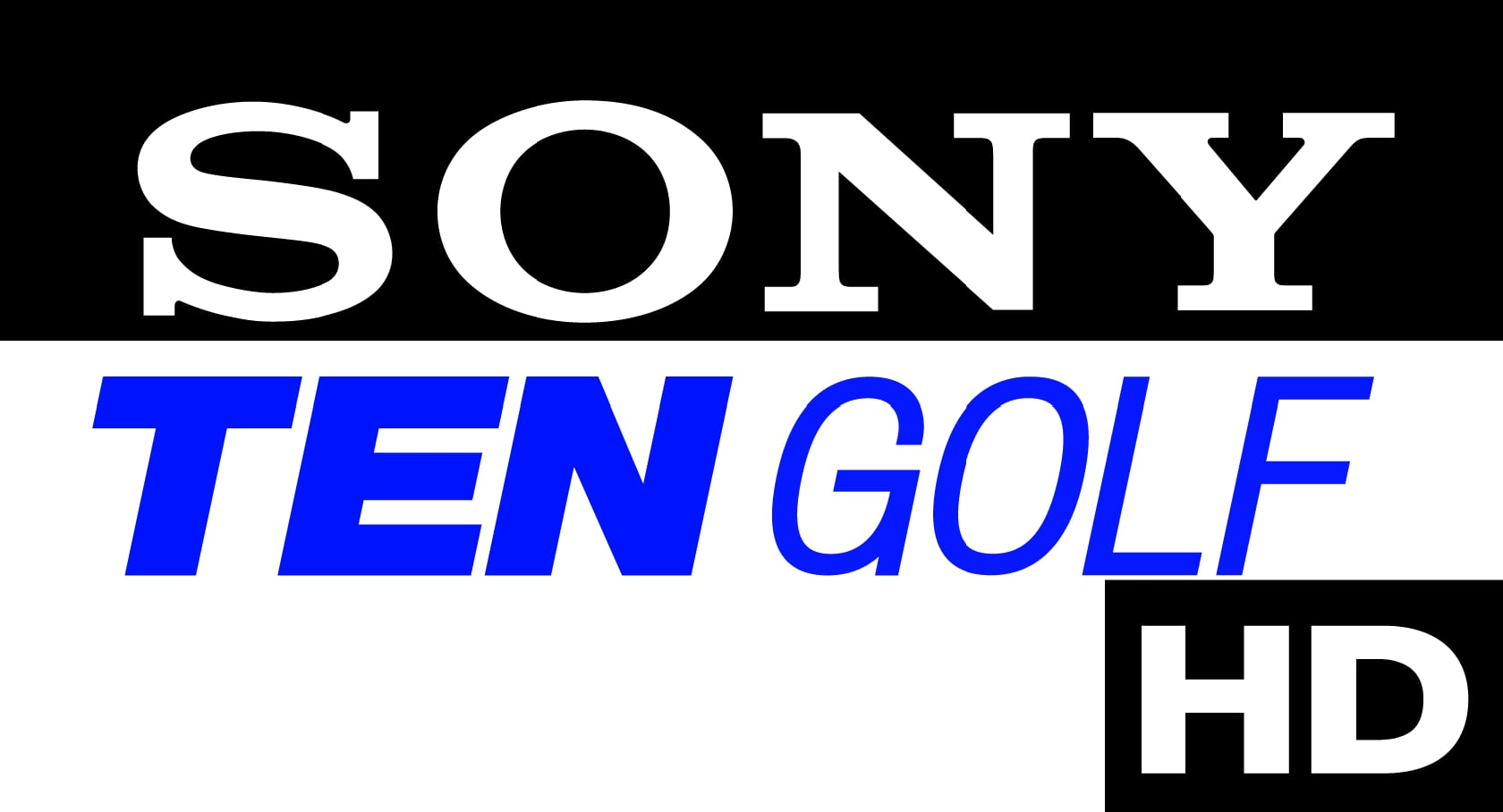
Sony Ten Golf logo

It was an HD, golf-focused channel launched on 7 October 2015. It had the broadcasting rights to the European Tour, Asian Tour, Ryder Cup, LPGA Tour, Royal Trophy, US PGA Championship, Senior PGA Championship, Professional Golf Tour of India, and Ladies European Tour. The channel was closed on 31 December 2018.
