= Sony Pix =

Indian English movie channel

- Logo used since 2022
- Country: India
- Broadcast area: India; Bangladesh; Maldives; Nepal; Sri Lanka

Programming
- Language: English
- Picture format: 1080i HDTV

Ownership
- Owner: Sony
- Parent: Sony Pictures Networks
- Sister channels: See List of channels owned by Sony Pictures Networks

History
- Launched: 1 April 2006; 20 years ago
- Former names: Set Pix (2006-2011)

Links
- Website: www.sonypix.com

Availability – Available on all major Indian DTH & Cables.

Terrestrial
- DVB-T2 (India): Check local frequencies

Streaming media
- SonyLIV: Live

Sony Pix (formerly known as Set Pix) is an India-based English language pay television movie channel owned by Sony Pictures Networks. It is available widely in the Indian subcontinent (excluding Pakistan and Bhutan) The channel mainly airs American live action and animated Hollywood movies in English.

== History ==
Sony PIX launched in April 2006 as a library re-run English movie channel until 31 March 2011. From 2006 to 2011, the channel broadcast various classic old American English movies. On 1 April 2011, the channel was revamped and started airing new and some popular content from Sony Pictures until 2017.

From 2013, Sony PIX signed a deal with Metro Goldwyn Mayer to premiere the studio's new titles on television; with this deal Sony PIX aired James Bond films and Hobbit series.

From 2015, Sony PIX signed a deal with NBCUniversal to air Universal Pictures latest releases. Furthermore, in 2018, Sony PIX signed a movie content deal with Warner Bros latest releases.

== Programming ==
Currently, Sony PIX has movie distribution license with Sony Pictures.

== Sports ==
Since its launch Sony PIX broadcast FIFA Football events up till 2015.

== Premiere nights ==
Sony PIX holds movie premiere events in selected cities which allows fans to watch movies before their release.

== Sony Le Plex HD ==
Sony Le Plex HD was the second English Movie channel from Culver Max Entertainment this channel was discontinued on 31 December 2018.

== See also ==
- Sony Le Plex HD
- Lists of television channels in India
