= Sony BBC Earth =

Indian pay television channel

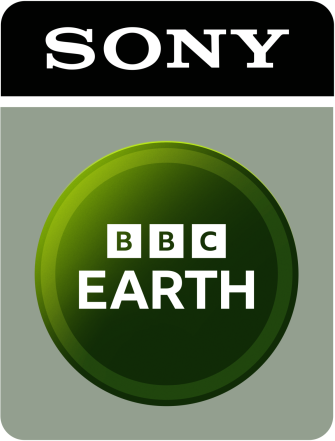
- Logo used since 2024
- Country: India

Programming
- Languages: English; Hindi; Tamil; Telugu
- Picture format: 1080i HDTV

Ownership
- Owner: Sony Pictures Networks (50%); BBC India (50%)
- Sister channels: See List of channels owned by Sony Pictures Networks

History
- Launched: 6 March 2017; 9 years ago

Links
- Website: www.sonybbcearth.com

Availability

Streaming media
- SonyLIV: Watch Sony BBC Earth Live (India)

Sony BBC Earth is an Indian pay television channel owned by BBC Studios and Sony Pictures Networks. The channel broadcasts BBC programming in English, Hindi, Tamil and Telugu through its four audio tracks available. The BBC entered into a joint venture with Multi Screen Media to launch the channel in India, which was finally launched on 6 March 2017, following regulatory approval of the joint venture.

== See also ==
- BBC Earth (TV channel)
