= Sony YAY! =

Indian children's television channel

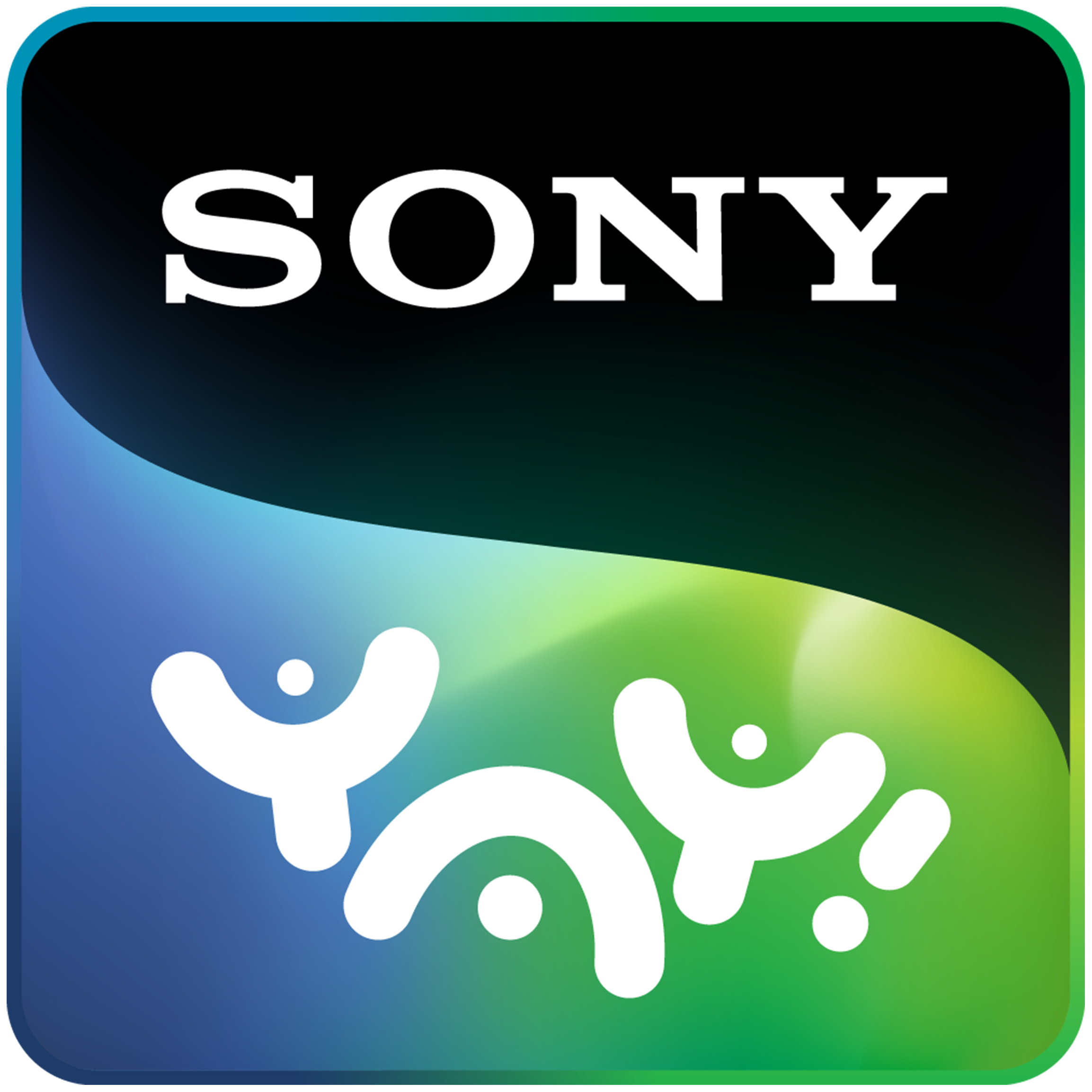
- Logo used since 24 October 2022
- Country: India
- Broadcast area: Nationwide

Programming
- Languages: Telugu; Kannada; Malayalam; Tamil; Marathi; Bengali; Hindi; Odia
- Picture format: 576i/480i SDTV

Ownership
- Owner: Sony Pictures Networks
- Sister channels: List of channels owned by Sony Pictures Networks

History
- Launched: 18 April 2017; 9 years ago
- Replaced: Animax India

Links
- Website: www.sonyyay.com

Sony YAY! is an Indian pay television channel aimed at children aged between 6 and 14, operated by Sony Pictures Networks. The channel primarily airs international animated series in various Indian languages.

== History ==
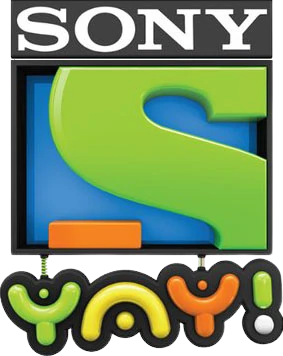
Former logo of Sony YAY! used from 2017 to 2022.

The channel was launched on 18 April 2017 in Hindi, Tamil, Telugu replacing the linear Animax channel in India, with Sony Pictures Networks announcing their plans to migrate all Japanese animated programming broadcast on the channel as paid content to its digital platform Sony LIV.

In 2018 the channel began telecasting in Malayalam and Bengali followed by in 2019 It began telecasting in English and Marathi then in 2020 the channel also launched the Kannada audio feed, making it the first kids channel available in several regional languages.

Sony YAY! began airing Taarak Mehta Kka Chhota Chashmah, an animated show based on the Hindi sitcom Taarak Mehta Ka Ooltah Chashmah on 19 April 2021. In June 2021, the channel started airing Bernard under the title Bhaalu Ye Bindass Hai .In the same year, the channel replaced the english feed with Gujarati

Ding Dong Bell Masti Ka Khel premiered on Sony YAY! on 16 August 2021. The second season of Taarak Mehta Kka Chhota Chashmah also aired on same date.

The French animated series Oggy and the Cockroaches started airing on the channel from 11 October 2021. In 2021, the channel only aired season 4 and season 3 (remake) of the series. With this, a feature film of the series i.e. Oggy and the Cockroaches: The Movie was also premiered on 25 October 2021 on the channel. The series airs with Indian dialogues and commentary by Mubeen Saudagar who voices all characters in Hindi version.

The channel launched the British animated series Horrid Henry in November 2021 with the title Haste Raho Henry. Season 6 and 7 of Oggy and the Cockroaches aired on the channel in 2022.

Sony YAY! also launched Harry & Bunnie in February 2022 under the title Rabbit Aur Bhalla Fun Hoga Khullam Khulla.

The third season of Taarak Mehta Kka Chhota Chashmah came out on 16 May 2022. With this, a tele movie (45-minute-long episode) titled Tapu and the Big Fat Alien Wedding was also premiered on 27 May 2022.

Sony YAY! started airing the Japanese animated series Robotan and a new show HaGoLa on 20 June 2022.

On 1 July 2022, Sony YAY! was launched in Malaysia in Tamil language on Telekom Malaysia with a total of seven popular kid's entertainment shows including Sab Jholmaal Hai, Guru Aur Bhole, Taarak Mehta Ka Chhota Chashma, Kicko & Super Speedo, Paap-O-Meter, Prince Jai aur Dumdaar Viru and HaGoLa.

On 15 August 2022, the channel launched hit Japanese animated television series Naruto in five regional languages – Hindi, Tamil, Telugu, Malayalam and Bengali. The head of programming of Sony YAY!, Ronojoy Chakraborty told IGN India in an interview that the channel plans to bring more anime content to the country after Naruto.

In September 2022, the channel was launched in Canada through Asian Television Network.

On 19 September 2022, the channel launched one more French animated series The Owl & Co under the title Dhakki Chiki Aaool!

On 24 October 2022, the channel launched Oggy and the Cockroaches: Next Generation, a brand new season of Oggy and the Cockroaches, on the occasion of Diwali. The fifth season of Oggy and the Cockroaches began to air on the channel from November 2022 in the occasion of Children's Day.

Sony YAY! began airing their original series PaJaMa in December 2022. Mr. Magoo was also premiered on 26 December 2022 on the channel.

A preschool block, Sony YAY! Jr, launched on 12 June 2023. The block is currently broadcasting Oggy Oggy, and is slated to air more preschool shows in the future.

On 4 September 2023, the channel launched in Singapore via Singtel. Similar to Malaysia, it broadcasts in Tamil.

The popular animated series Shinchan premiered on Sony YAY! in India in May 2024.

On 7 April 2025, the channel began airing the popular Japanese animated television series Jujutsu Kaisen for the first time on Indian television in regional language dubs.

The channel also launched another Japanese animated series, i.e., One Punch Man on 22 November 2025.
