= Sony Max =

Indian pay television channel

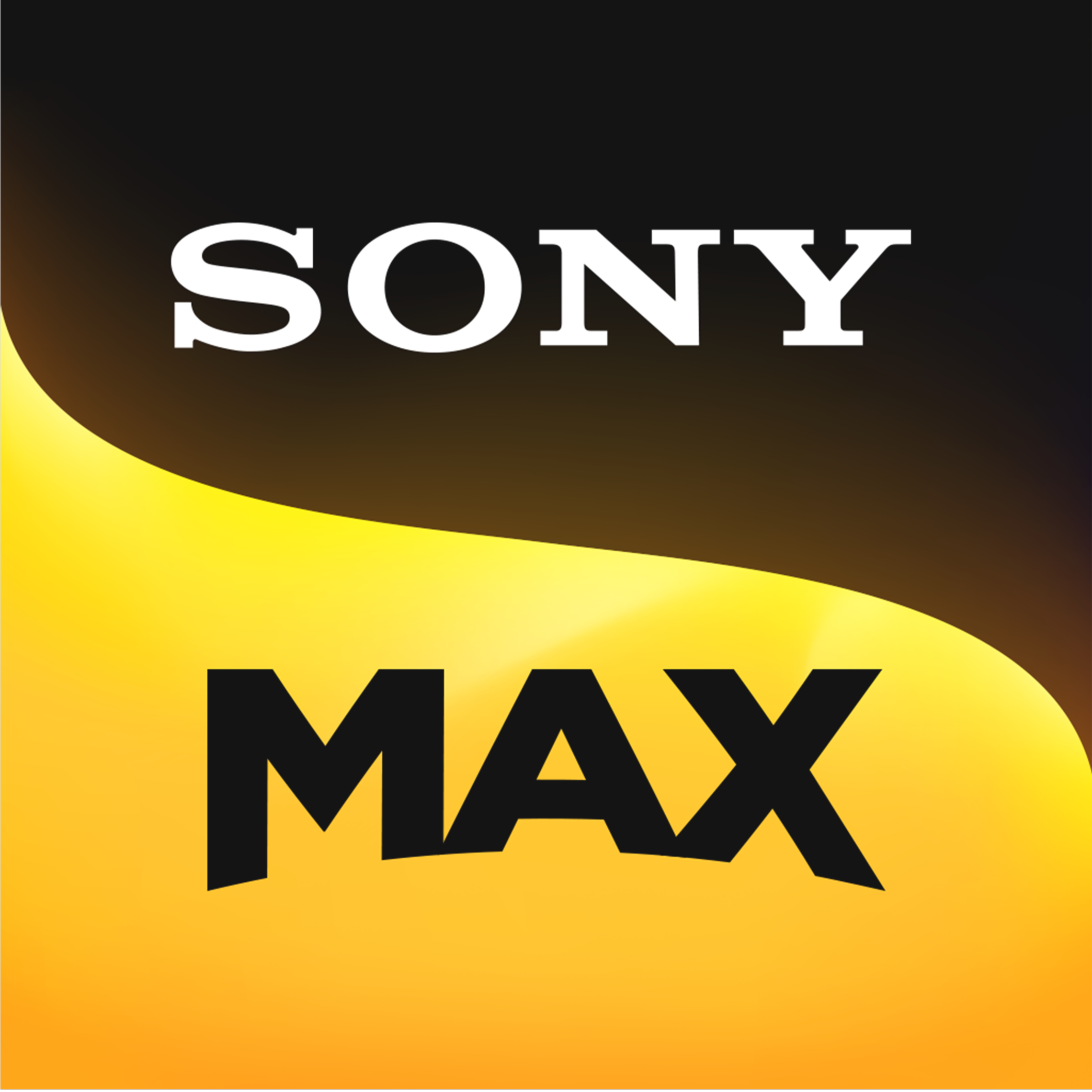
- Logo used since 2022
- Country: India

Programming
- Picture format: 1080i HDTV

Ownership
- Owner: Sony
- Parent: Sony Pictures Networks
- Sister channels: See List of channels owned by Sony Pictures Networks

History
- Launched: 12 October 1999; 27 years ago

Links
- Website: www.sonymax.tv

Availability

Streaming media
- Sling TV: Internet Protocol television
- SonyLIV: Live

Sony Max is an Indian pay television entertainment channel which is a sister channel to Sony Entertainment Television, operated by Sony Pictures Networks. The channel started broadcasting on 20 July 1999 and is available internationally. It launched a HD simulcast version on 25 December 2015.

== Programming ==
Its main audience attraction, other than Hindi-language movies, was the Twenty20 cricket tournament Indian Premier League (IPL), which the channel had been broadcasting since the tournament's launch in 2008 till 2017, after which it sold the broadcasting rights to Star Sports. It also airs complimentary cricket talk show programmes like Extraaa Innings T20. It occasionally airs Hollywood movies and WWE matches in Hindi. Sony Max is one of the most watched television channels of India, as of July 2018 the second most popular in the country, as well as the top Bollywood channel in the UK that month, ahead of rivals like Zee Cinema.

== Associated channels ==
=== Sony Max 1 ===
Sony Max 1 is a Hindi movie channel from Culver Max Entertainment, has been launched officially on 1 May 2025.

=== Sony Max 2 ===
Sony Max 2 is an Indian pay television channel owned by Culver Max Entertainment and launched in 2014. It is the second Indian channel launched by Sony which is focused solely on old Hindi-language movie broadcasts, being the sister channel of Sony Max. It primarily targets audiences interested in classic Bollywood films, offering a dedicated platform for nostalgia and entertainment.

=== Sony Wah ===
Sony Wah is an Indian free-to-air television channel owned by Culver Max Entertainment. It is targeted towards audience of small towns and rural areas in the country and its programming consists on Hindi-language movies and southern Indian films dubbed in that language.
