= HBO Latin America Group =

Group of pay television networks

HBO Latin America
- Type: subsidiary
- Industry: Entertainment; Pay television Interactive media
- Founded: October 31, 1991; 35 years ago
- Defunct: May 4, 2020; 6 years ago
- Fate: Merged into successors WarnerMedia Latin America and Ole Distribution, thus taking control of all HBO channels in Latin America and currently operated under HBO's international division
- Successors: Warner Bros. Discovery Americas; Ole Distribution (Distributor of the other channels that HBO Latin America distributed)
- Headquarters: Miami, United States
- Area served: Latin America
- Owner: Warner Bros. Discovery International
- Subsidiaries: Owned-and-operated channels: HBO; HBO2; HBO Plus; HBO Signature; HBO Family; HBO Mundi; HBO Pop; HBO Xtreme; Cinemax; Distributed channels: A&E; History; History 2 Lifetime (all 4 are owned and operated by A+E Networks Latin America, expect Lifetime is a joint venture with Sony Pictures Television Latin America)
- Website: hbolag.tv (Discontinued)

HBO Latin America was a company that owned and distributed several television channels in the region of Latin America. It was originally founded as a joint venture between Time Warner and Ole Communications in 1991 with the launch of HBO in the region. The HBO Brazilian channel was launched in 1994. In 1990s Sony and Disney became shareholders and left in 2010. The company later began distributing other channels from companies such as Turner, Sony, A&E and NBCUniversal.

In October 2019, WarnerMedia announced that it was buying Ole Communications's minority interest in the HBO Latin America Group, thus taking full control of all HBO channels within the Latin American region. HBO Brasil, which is another joint venture of HBO with Ole was not affected by the transaction. WarnerMedia and Ole Communications continued their basic television channel distribution in Latin America. Eventually, the company was merged into WarnerMedia in May 2020 (now Warner Bros. Discovery Americas).

== History ==
Cable television already existed in other countries before HBO arrived in the region. Although there had been previous attempts to create specialized subscription television services (such as VCC in Buenos Aires , Argentina , and Cablevisión in Mexico City ), television signals from the United States were transmitted in other countries via satellite dishes that could be acquired on the black market, or were distributed illegally through local television operators.

In January 1991, following the success of the HBO premium service for the Hispanic audience in the United States, HBO had collarborated with Venezuelan pay-TV television network company Omnivision to bring the HBO channel for Latinoamerica, as the companies have formed a joint-venture entertainment television broadcasting division that would serve as HBO's own Latinoamerican division entitled HBO Olé as they would launch and operation of a Spanish-language pay-tv service in Venezuela. Service is expected to reach most of Latin America, excluding Brazil, and the Caribbean as HBO Latin America have been established and they'll launched its commercial-free network HBO Latin America, which have been launched 8 months later on October 31, 1991.

In January 1994, HBO Ole had partnered with the American film & television entertainment production studio Sony Pictures as the latter film studik had brought a substantial equity stake in HBO Ole as the HBO Ole company have been renamed to HBO Ole Partners, through the new alliance HBO Ole Partners would form a new premium television channel Cinemax that could broadcast films from HBO's sibling Warner Bros. and Sony Pictures while it have plans to launch & broadcast and produce its own original programming in Latinoamerica with Latin American talent.

In 1996, HBO Ole launched its first multiplexed service, HBO Ole 2 (now HBO+), which offered programming as an alternative to HBO Ole. Two years later in 1999, HBO Digiplex was launched, the first premium multiplex package offering first-run movies across five channels (HBO Ole East, HBO Ole West, HBO Plus, Cinemax East and Cinemax West).

In July 2008, HBO Latin America had filed a lawsuit against Argentian cable operator Multicanal SA, who had alleged illegal distribution of HBO Latin American's 10 television channels, as HBO Latin America had suspended 10 channels including HBO and Cinema from Multicanal's lineup, as HBO Latin America had accused the cable operator of illegally broadcasting the signals and failing to present an adequate anti-piracy proposal, Multicanal lashed out at them in counter-advertisements, claimed that HBO Latin America had raised rates by more than 100% and refused to engage in negotiations regarding digital conversion, as the lawsuit have been dismissed as Argentine antitrust and competition regulators intervened, ordering HBO to continue providing the channels to Multicanal while the companies battled out the regulatory and legal fallout.

In 2017, HBO announced the launch of its app entitled HBO Extras, offers users exclusive information about the channel's series. That same year, due to the general crisis in Venezuela, the company moved its main offices to Bogotá, Colombia, where a regional subsidiary was already operating.

== Operating channels ==
HBO Latin America Group owns and operates these channels:

=== Spanish ===
- HBO Latin America (formerly known as HBO Ole)
- HBO 2
- HBO+ (formerly known as HBO Ole 2 and HBO Plus)
- HBO Family
- HBO Signature
- Cinemax Latin America (Since 2009 as an ad-supported basic cable network)

=== Portuguese ===
There are also Portuguese feeds of the HBO Latin America channels.

- HBO Brasil
- HBO 2
- HBO+
- HBO Family
- HBO Signature

=== Other ===
HBO Caribbean is operated as a division of HBO Latin America.

== Distributed channels ==
Warner Bros. Discovery distributes the following channels:

=== Owned by A+E Networks Latin America ===
- History Latin America
- H2 Latin America (started in July 2014 to replace Bio.)
- A&E Latin America
- Lifetime Latin America (started in June 2014 to replace Sony Spin)

=== Owned by NBCUniversal International Networks Latin America ===
- E! Latin America (owned by Comcast/NBCUniversal and Ole Communications)
- Telemundo Internacional (except in Mexico. Owned by Comcast/NBCUniversal and Ole Communications)
- Universal TV (except in Brazil, where the channel is operated by a 50/50 joint venture between NBCU and Canais Globo and distributed by Canais Globo)
- Studio Universal (except in Brazil, where the channel is operated by a 50/50 joint venture between NBCU and Canais Globo and distributed by Canais Globo)
- USA Network (replaced Syfy)

=== Owned by Sony Pictures Television Networks Latin America ===
- Sony Channel
- AXN

=== Owned by Warner Bros. Discovery ===
- Warner TV

=== Owned by OLE Communications ===
- IVC Network

== Defunct channels ==
- Animax
- Locomotion
- Sony Spin
- TV Quality
- Mundo Olé
- A&E Mundo
- Syfy
- Sci-Fi
- HBO Family
- HBO HD

== See also ==
- List of HBO Latin America original series
- Turner Broadcasting System
- WarnerMedia
