= List of HBO Latin America original series =

HBO Latin America has distributed a number of original programs, including original series, specials, miniseries, documentaries and films.

The first self-commissioned original content series was Epitafios, released in 2004, and the company has grown its original content in the region since that time. All programming is organized by its primary genre or format, country of production and is sorted by premiere date.

== Original programming ==
=== Drama ===
| Title | Genre | Country | Premiere | Seasons/episodes | Status |
|---|---|---|---|---|---|
| Epitafios | Crime drama | Argentina | August 14, 2004 | 2 seasons, 26 episodes | Ended |
| Mandrake | Drama | Brazil | October 30, 2005 | 2 seasons, 13 episodes | Ended |
| Filhos do Carnaval | Drama | Brazil | March 5, 2006 | 2 seasons, 13 episodes | Ended |
| Capadocia | Drama | Mexico | March 2, 2008 | 3 seasons, 39 episodes | Ended |
| Alice | Drama | Brazil | September 21, 2008 | 1 season, 13 episodes | Ended |
| Prófugos | Crime drama | Chile | September 3, 2011 | 2 seasons, 26 episodes | Ended |
| Preamar | Drama | Brazil | May 6, 2012 | 1 season, 13 episodes | Ended |
| Destino | Anthology drama | Brazil | November 25, 2012 | 3 seasons, 18 episodes | Ended |
| Sr. Ávila | Crime drama | Mexico | May 26, 2013 | 4 seasons, 43 episodes | Ended |
| O Negócio | Drama | Brazil | August 18, 2013 | 4 seasons, 51 episodes | Ended |
| Psi | Drama | Brazil | March 24, 2014 | 4 seasons, 42 episodes | Pending |
| El Hipnotizador | Fantasy drama | Argentina, Brazil and Uruguay | August 23, 2015 | 2 seasons, 16 episodes | Pending |
| Magnifica 70 | Drama | Brazil | May 24, 2015 | 3 seasons, 33 episodes | Ended |
| Dios Inc. | Thriller | Mexico | January 24, 2016 | 1 seasons, 12 episodes | Pending |
| El Jardín de Bronce | Crime drama | Argentina | June 25, 2017 | 3 seasons, 24 episodes | Pending |
| The Secret Life of Couples | Drama | Brazil | October 1, 2017 | 1 seasons, 12 episodes | Pending |
| Pico da Neblina | Drama | Brazil | August 4, 2019 | 2 seasons, 20 episodes | Pending |
| Santos Dumont | Historical drama | Brazil | November 10, 2019 | 1 season, 6 episodes | Miniseries |
| Entre Hombres | Drama | Argentina | September 26, 2021 | 1 season, 4 episodes | Miniseries |
| The American Guest | Historical drama | Brazil | September 26, 2021 | 1 season, 4 episodes | Miniseries |
| Amsterdam | Drama | Mexico | March 20, 2022 | 1 season, 10 episodes | Cancelled |
| María Marta: El Crimen del Country | Crime drama | Argentina | July 17, 2022 | 1 season, 8 episodes | Miniseries |
| Sierra Madre: Prohibido Pasar | Crime drama | Mexico | Abril 21, 2023 | 1 season, 9 episodes | Pending |

=== Comedy ===
| Title | Genre | Country | Premiere | Seasons/episodes | Status |
|---|---|---|---|---|---|
| Mulher de Fases | Comedy | Brazil | April 11, 2011 | 1 season, 13 episodes | Ended |
| (fdp) | Comedy drama | Brazil | August 26, 2012 | 1 season, 13 episodes | Ended |
| Todxs Nós | Comedy drama | Brazil | March 22, 2020 | 1 season, 8 episodes | Pending |
| Hard | Comedy | Brazil | May 17, 2020 | 1 season, 6 episodes | Pending |

=== Docuseries ===
| Title | Genre | Country | Premiere | Seasons/episodes | Status |
|---|---|---|---|---|---|
| Mulher Arte | Documentary | Brazil | July 24, 2014 | 1 season, 10 episodes | Ended |
| Clubversão | Documentary | Brazil | October 7, 2014 | 2 seasons, 25 episodes | Ended |
| Héroes Cotidianos | Documentary | Mexico | November 3, 2014 | 1 season, 6 episodes | Ended |
| O Nome Dela é Gal | Biography | Brazil | June 11, 2017 | 1 season, 4 episodes | Ended |
| Outros Tempos | Documentary | Brazil | July 4, 2017 | 2 seasons, 16 episodes | Ended |
| Fora do Armário | Documentary | Brazil | April 5, 2018 | 1 season, 10 episodes | Ended |
| Destino Rusia 2018 | Miniseries | Co-production with HBO Europe | April 6, 2018 | 1 season, 10 episodes | Ended |
| Minha Vida É um Circo | Documentary | Brazil | June 4, 2018 | 1 season, 8 episodes | Ended |
| O Negro no Futebol Brasileiro | Documentary | Brazil | August 30, 2018 | 1 season, 4 episodes | Ended |
| Dia Um | Documentary | Brazil | October 1, 2018 | 1 season, 10 episodes | Ended |
| Milton Nascimento: Intimidade e Poesia | Documentary | Brazil | November 10, 2018 | 1 season, 4 episodes | Ended |
| Babel SP | Documentary | Brazil | August 1, 2019 | 1 season, 7 episodes | Ended |
| Em Nome dos Pais | Documentary | Brazil | March 4, 2020 | 1 season, 4 episodes | Ended |
| Elas no Singular | Biography | Brazil | March 17, 2020 | 1 season, 8 episodes | Ended |
| Missões de Vida | Documentary | Brazil | April 6, 2020 | 1 season, 10 episodes | Pending |

=== Variety and talk shows ===
| Title | Genre | Country | Premiere | Seasons/episodes | Status |
|---|---|---|---|---|---|
| Chumel con Chumel Torres | Comedy news | Mexico | July 26, 2016 | 3 seasons, 30 episodes | Ended |
| Greg News com Gregório Duvivier | Comedy news | Brazil | May 5, 2017 | 2 seasons, 42 episodes | Pending |
