= Lifetime (TV channel) =

American cable and satellite television channel

- Tenth and current logo, introduced in 2020
- Country: United States
- Headquarters: New York City, New York

Programming
- Language: English
- Picture format: 1080i HDTV

Ownership
- Owner: A+E Global Media
- Parent: Lifetime Entertainment Services
- Sister channels: LMN; LRW

History
- Launched: February 1, 1984; 42 years ago
- Replaced: Cable Health Network; Daytime (Lifetime is a merger of the two formerly separate channels, and it was owned by Viacom from its launch in 1984 until 1994)

Links
- Website: www.mylifetime.com

Availability

Terrestrial
- Affiliated Streaming Service(s): Tubi

Streaming media
- Service(s): Frndly TV, Hulu + Live TV, Philo, Sling TV

Lifetime is an American basic cable channel that is part of Lifetime Entertainment Services, a subsidiary of A+E Global Media, which was jointly owned by Hearst Communications and the Walt Disney Company and now currently fully owned by Hearst Communications. It features programming that is geared toward women or features women in lead roles. As of November 2023, Lifetime is available to approximately 63,000,000 pay television households in the United States, down from its 2011 peak of 100,000,000 households.

As of November 2023, Lifetime has garnered nominations for 63 Emmy Awards, 8 Golden Globe Awards and 20 Critics' Choice Movie Awards.

== History ==
=== Predecessors ===
There were two television channels that preceded Lifetime in its current incarnation. Daytime, originally called BETA, was launched in March 1982 by Hearst-ABC Video Services. The cable service operated four hours per day on weekdays. The service was focused on alternative women's programming. The following year, the Cable Health Network was launched as a full-time channel in June 1982 with a range of health-related programming.

=== Hearst/ABC-Viacom Entertainment Services ===
Lifetime was established on February 1, 1984, as the result of a merger of Hearst/ABC's Daytime and Viacom's Cable Health Network. A board for the new network was formed with equal representation from Hearst, ABC, and Viacom, and the board elected Thomas Burchill as the new network's first CEO. It was not an initial success, reportedly losing $36 million in its first two years of operation, and did not become profitable until 1986. The channel suffered from low viewership, with a poll reportedly finding that some TV viewers erroneously believed it carried religious content.

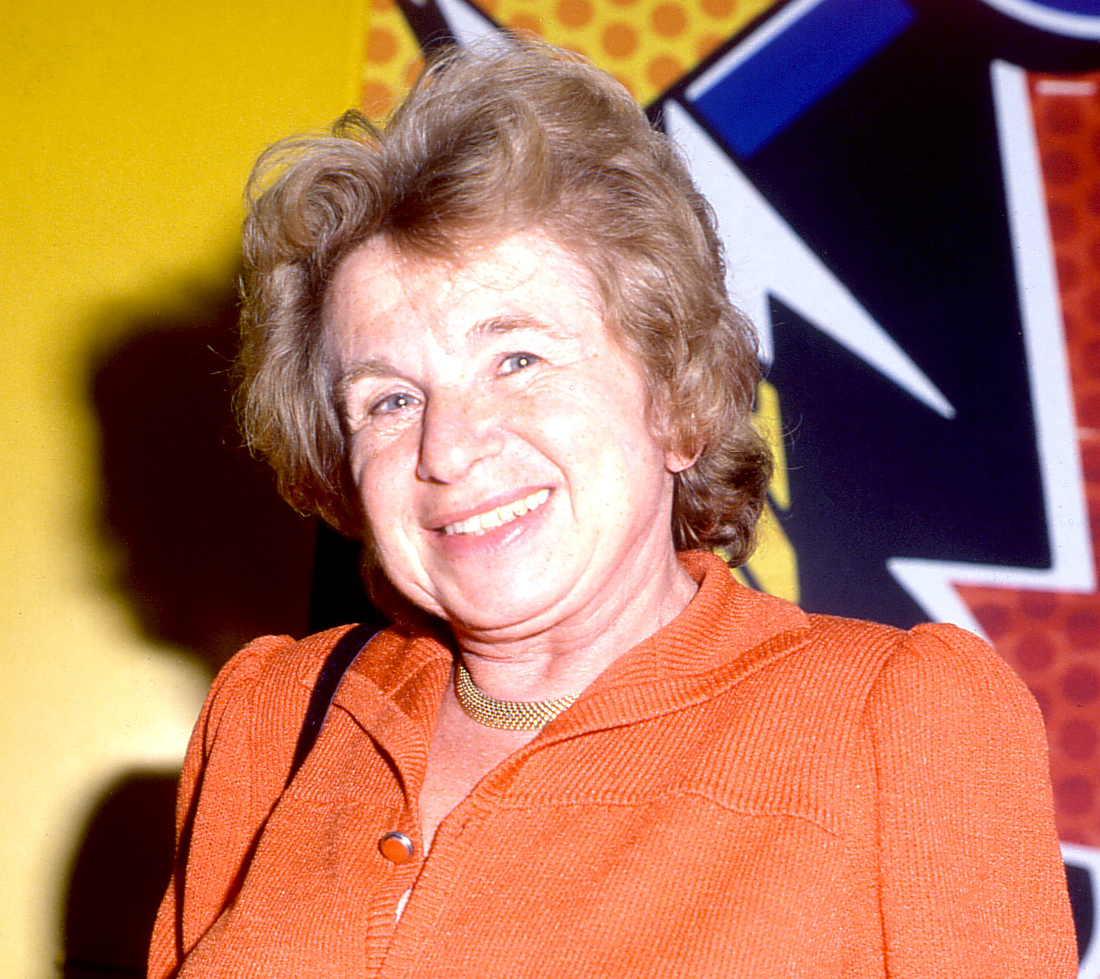
Ruth Westheimer

In 1985, Lifetime started branding itself as "Talk Television", with a nightly lineup of talk shows and call-in programs hosted by people including Regis Philbin and Ruth Westheimer (known as "Dr. Ruth"). In the process, the creators dropped the apple from the logo.

During the 1980s and early 1990s, Lifetime devoted itself on Sundays to the airing of in-depth medical programs—and advertising—for physicians under the banner of Lifetime Medical Television (LMT). As early as 1990, however, plans were floated to move LMT to another channel, with TLC and CNBC being considered. Lifetime began programming Sundays on August 1, 1993.

In 1988, Lifetime hired Patricia Fili as its head of programming. In the first three years of her tenure, she changed 60 percent of Lifetime's programming, by her own estimate. In addition to overhauling Lifetime's signature talk show, Attitudes, by hiring a new producer and refocusing it on current women's issues, Fili acquired the rights to syndicated network hits like Moonlighting and L.A. Law. She also oversaw the production of the first Lifetime movies ever made, along with carrying the final three seasons of the Blair Brown–starring dramedy The Days and Nights of Molly Dodd from NBC after the network canceled it. The network also showed movies from the portfolios of its owners, Hearst, ABC, and Viacom. In 1991, reporter Joshua Hammer stated, "Considered one of cable TV's backwaters, [...] Lifetime network was replete with annoying gabfests for housewives and recycled, long-forgotten network television series, such as Partners in Crime and MacGruder and Loud. [...] Under Fili's direction, Lifetime has gone a long way toward shedding its low-rent image."

Douglas McCormick became the network's president in 1993. He moved to make Lifetime a seven-day-a-week network by ending Lifetime Medical Television after nearly a decade of existence, and the next year, the channel relaunched with a new tagline, "Television for Women". Lifetime began airing a limited amount of women's sports coverage, including the WNBA and the America's Cup, in which it sponsored the first women's crew team to compete. McCormick also strengthened the network's ties with women's organizations, such as the National Organization for Women, and began airing public service announcements about women's issues, such as breast cancer awareness.

Meanwhile, the channel's original programming was aimed not just at women aged 24–44, but these women's spouses, who research showed watched the network in the evenings with their wives. This was done by making the male characters in Lifetime's original programming – such as the film series Spenser: For Hire – more appealing to men by making them more masculine. These roles were more stereotypical than previous Lifetime movies, which usually featured women protagonists on their own. This helped Lifetime take advantage of a known bias in the Nielsen ranking system that favored "upscale" couples who shared a television set. By January 1995, Lifetime was the sixth most-highly rated subscription network by Nielsen.

=== Lifetime Entertainment Services ===
In 1996, TCI, one of the United States' largest subscription providers, announced that it would no longer carry Lifetime in certain markets to make room for the soon-to-be-launched Fox News Channel, in which TCI held a financial stake. According to Lifetime executives, the network stood to lose up to one million subscribers due to TCI's move. However, Lifetime published advertisements in some of the markets that would be affected – including Eugene, Oregon and Newport, Rhode Island – informing customers that TCI was removing the only network that was made for women. After TCI customers called the company to complain, TCI cut back the number of homes that would lose Lifetime to approximately 300,000. Still, women's groups and politicians rallied behind Lifetime. Colorado representative Patricia Schroeder called TCI's decision a "power play" between TCI chief executive John Malone and Fox executive Rupert Murdoch, and said, "Women kind of feel like they're being rolled over so that the guys who run these companies can make more money."

Massachusetts Congressman Barney Frank said that the decision showed that Fox "might have an agenda of its own that is anti-woman." TCI executives were surprised and angry about the public's reaction. TCI's vice president of programming was quoted in The New York Times as saying, "I resent the implication that they are the women's network. Other networks come in to us and say Lifetime is not telling the truth. Lifetime is a women's channel only in name and advertising. [...] It programs for ratings." TCI senior vice president Robert Thomson stated that the reaction was "laughably out of scale," based on the fact that less than 10 percent of Lifetime's audience would be affected. TCI executives chalked the politicians' reactions up to lobbying by Lifetime (it being an election year), and suggested to the Times that in retaliation, Disney, one of Lifetime's parent companies, might have trouble launching a new network on TCI. In 1997, it was reported that Lifetime had 67.7 million subscribers.

=== A&E ownership ===
On August 27, 2009, Lifetime was acquired by A&E Networks; the company was already owned by Lifetime's shareholders Hearst and Disney, but with additional shares owned by NBCUniversal. NBCUniversal divested its stake in A&E Networks in 2012, once again leaving the network as a Disney/Hearst joint venture.

== Programming ==
Lifetime, best known for its "women in peril" original movies

— Chicago Tribune, 2019

Lifetime's original content is composed of made-for-TV films and reality series, such as Dance Moms. The network states that it "is committed to offering the highest quality entertainment and information programming, and advocating a wide range of issues affecting women and their families."

In the past, Lifetime used to air several game shows in daytime and early evenings, including Supermarket Sweep, Shop 'til You Drop, Rodeo Drive, Born Lucky, and Debt. Lifetime also produced one original game show (Who Knows You Best?, starring Gina St. John), with a format based on The Newlywed Game; it was canceled after one season. The network has also previously produced scripted dramas, such as Devious Maids and Witches of East End.

The network currently airs a mix of second-run syndicated series (such as How I Met Your Mother and Grey's Anatomy) during the daytime hours. In the past, Lifetime has revived several programs that originally aired on other networks. In 1988, it bought the rights to the existing 26 episodes of The Days and Nights of Molly Dodd from its original broadcaster NBC, and produced 39 additional episodes of the series. Lifetime did not renew the show reportedly because of low ratings and the high cost to produce the program. In late 2011, the network began to air new episodes of America's Most Wanted, a program canceled in series form by Fox at the end of the 2010–11 season, although special feature episodes continued to air intermittently on Fox. Lifetime aired more than 40 new episodes of the program before cancelling it in 2013.

On July 21, 2017, Lifetime simulcasted the premiere of Disney Channel's original movie Descendants 2; marking the first time the channel premiered a program produced for a wholly owned Disney subsidiary.

In 2018, Lifetime premiered Harry & Meghan: A Royal Romance, a story about the relationship between Prince Harry and Meghan Markle. It also premiered the James Corden-produced Seatbelt Psychic with Thomas John.

=== Films ===
In addition to feature films, as well as made-for-television films previously broadcast on other networks, Lifetime is known for producing various original films of its own. These films are produced by the network's own Lifetime Pictures unit. A movie-focused spin-off channel, known informally as the Lifetime Movie Network or "LMN" due to its frequent rebrands, was launched in 1998.

In its early years, Hearst Entertainment supplied its programming to Lifetime, which was ended in 2002.

=== Sports ===
In its early years, Lifetime occasionally broadcast coverage of women's professional sports. From its inaugural season in 1997 to 2000, Lifetime was one of three broadcasters of the Women's National Basketball Association (WNBA), alongside NBC and ESPN. In 2000, Lifetime phased out its live broadcasts and replaced them with an original series documenting the lives of WNBA players. The network stated that it wanted to focus on "stories" rather than event coverage; the program package would move to ESPN2. As part of an arrangement with Raycom Sports, the network also broadcast the LPGA's Tournament of Champions in 1998.

In February 2017, A&E Networks acquired an equity stake in the National Women's Soccer League, and announced that Lifetime would broadcast a weekly, Saturday-afternoon game beginning in the 2017 season.

=== High Definition ===
Lifetime launched an HD simulcast on April 16, 2008.

== International versions ==
=== Canada ===
On May 30, 2012, Canadian television broadcaster Shaw Media announced that it would rebrand Showcase Diva, a Category B subscription specialty channel as the Canadian version of Lifetime under a licensing agreement with A+E Networks; Showcase Diva relaunched as Lifetime on August 27, 2012.

=== Southeast Asia ===
AETN All Asia Networks plans to bring the Lifetime channel into Southeast Asia. The channel began broadcasting on June 14, 2013, 6.00 p.m with Astro and StarHub TV being two of the first providers to carry Lifetime in Asia. In July, available in Hong Kong now TV channel 520. And since September 1, 2014, Lifetime Asia airs in the Philippines on Dream Satellite TV channel 18 and SkyCable.

=== United Kingdom and Ireland ===
A+E Networks UK launched a version of Lifetime for the UK and Ireland in November 2013. The network was unsuccessful in the market, as Lifetime's program contractors instead distributed their programming on different networks, and it slowly lost rights over the years. The channel closed at 06:00 on March 1, 2021, after A+E Networks UK contracted with Discovery+ to carry Lifetime's original network-produced American programming in the UK and Ireland.

=== Latin America ===
Lifetime Latin America
- Broadcast area: Latin America

Programming
- Languages: Spanish, Portuguese

Ownership
- Owner: A&E Networks; Sony Pictures Television
- Sister channels: A&E; History; H2; Sony Channel; AXN

History
- Launched: July 1, 2014; 12 years ago
- Replaced: Sony Spin

Links
- Website: Lifetime Latin America; Lifetime Brazil

Lifetime announced the launch of a Latin American version of the network, which launched on July 1, 2014, in association with Sony Pictures Television Latin America. It supplanted the now-defunct Sony Spin channel (formerly known as Locomotion from 1996 to 2005 and Animax from 2005 to 2011) on the Amazonas satellite serving South America. Lifetime Latin America is currently distributed by Ole Distribution, currently based in Bogotá, Colombia, under license from A+E Networks Latin America and Sony Pictures Television Latin America. In Brazil, its programming is fully dubbed in Portuguese.

In Mexico, it was launched on October 1, 2014, replacing The Biography Channel.

=== Africa ===
A+E Networks launched the African version of Lifetime on Channel 131 on DStv on July 22, 2014. On April 25, 2022, it was announced the channel alongside Lifetime Play would cease transmission in Africa by the end of May.

=== Israel ===
A+E Networks launched a version of Lifetime for Israel on September 14, 2014, replacing The Biography Channel.

=== Turkey ===
On March 16, 2016, A&E Networks announced that Lifetime (Turkey) channel would be launched on April 26, 2016, in Turkey with the cooperation of Multi Channel Developers. Lifetime Turkey ceased operations on April 26, 2019.

=== South Korea ===
A localized version of Lifetime was launched on September 22, 2017, by A+E Networks Asia-Pacific and local company iHQ. Its programming primarily consists of Korean dramas, talk shows, and entertainment programs. Backstreet Rookie is the first Korean drama invested in by the channel.

=== MENA ===
In 2019, A&E Networks was scheduled to launch a version of Lifetime for the Middle East & Northern Africa region.

=== Australia ===
A&E Networks launched a version of Lifetime Movie Network for Australia on September 1, 2020, as a joint venture with the Foxtel network. The channel closed at midnight on July 31, 2025, as the remaining content migrated to 9Now.

== LRW ==
LRW
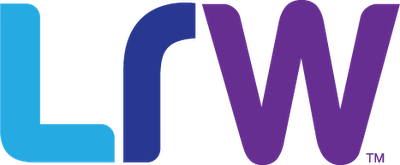

Programming
- Picture format: 480i (SDTV)

Ownership
- Parent: Lifetime Entertainment Services

History
- Launched: August 20, 2001; 25 years ago

LRW, or Lifetime Real Women, is an American pay television channel which is intended as a complementary service to the main Lifetime network. It was launched in August 2001, mainly as a response to Lifetime's challenges from the then-launching WE tv and Oxygen networks for the women's network market. LRW is available in over 10 million homes via some cable providers, Verizon FiOS, and AT&T U-verse. The network carries reality programming that had once aired or is currently airing on the main Lifetime network, and formerly imported series with rights held by Lifetime but no carriage due to the main network's current format. LRW also features no original series or films, deferring from Lifetime and LMN, though it did burn off the 2011 Lifetime reality series Love Handles: Couples in Crisis, which only aired twice on the main network.

DirecTV carried the network until July 2007. Orby TV also carried the network for the last year of that service's existence.

Overall carriage has declined as providers choose instead to carry high definition networks rather than standard definition-only channels such as LRW without original programming, and Lifetime itself promoting on-demand access to past series, along with broadcast venues such as Start TV, the defunct Twist and TrueReal subchannel networks, and ad-supported streaming FAST channels.

In recent years, LRW has lost carriage with the growth of streaming alternatives and has generally been depreciated by A+E Global Media in current retransmission consent negotiations with cable and streaming providers.

== Lifetime Movie Club ==
On July 2, 2015, Lifetime launched a streaming service branded as Lifetime Movie Club. The service offers over 2,000 titles, both originally-produced and acquired by Lifetime.
