= Ole Distribution =

Joint venture subsidiary between Warner Bros. Discovery and Ole Communications

- Type: Joint venture
- Industry: Entertainment; Pay television Interactive Media
- Predecessor: HBO Latin America Group
- Founded: May 4, 2020; 6 years ago
- Headquarters: Miami, Florida, United States
- Area served: Latin America
- Owners: Each of 50% owned by: Skydance Latin America and Caribbean; Ole Communications
- Subsidiaries: Distributed channels: A&E Latin America; History Latin America; H2 Latin America; Lifetime Latin America (all 4 are owned and operated by A+E Networks Latin America, expect Lifetime Latin America is a joint venture with Sony Pictures Television Latin America)
- Website: Official Website

Ole Distribution is a company which owns several pay television networks in the region of Latin America. The company was founded as a joint venture between Warner Bros. Discovery and Ole Communications.

== Distributed channels ==
Ole Distribution distributes the following channels:

Owned by A+E Networks Latin America (owned by A+E Networks and Ole Communications):

- History Latin America
- History 2 Latin America (started in July 2014 to replace Bio.)
- A&E Latin America
- Lifetime Latin America (started in June 2014 to replace Sony Spin)

AMC Networks International Latin America

- AMC Latin America
- AMC Series
- El Gourmet
- Film&Arts
- Europa Europa

NBCUniversal International Networks Latin America (owned by Comcast/NBCUniversal and Ole Communications):

- Telemundo Internacional (except in Mexico; not available in Brazil)
- Universal TV (except in Brazil, where the channel is operated by a 50/50 joint venture between NBCU and Globo and distributed by Globo)
- Universal+ Latin America (includes Brazil)
- Studio Universal (except in Brazil, where the channel is operated by a 50/50 joint venture between NBCU and Globo and distributed by Globo)
- DreamWorks Channel Latin America (includes Brazil)

Versant:

- E! Latin America (includes Brazil)
- USA Network (except in Brazil, where the channel is operated by a 50/50 joint venture between Versant and Globo and distributed by Globo)

Sony Pictures Entertainment:

- Sony Channel
- Sony Movies
- AXN

OLE Communications

- IVC Networks Latin America (except in Mexico and Brazil)

== Defunct channels ==
- Sci-Fi (now Syfy)
- SYFY
- Hallmark Channel
- Bio.
- Locomotion
- Sony Spin
- TV Quality
- TeleUno
- Mundo Olé
- A&E Mundo
- Calle 13
- Movietime
- CBS Telenoticias

== See also ==
- Warner Bros. Discovery Americas
