= MNN =

MNN may refer to:

- Madrid Nuevo Norte, an urban redevelopment programme
- Manhattan Neighborhood Network
- Medical News Network
- Mission Network News
- Menston railway station in the United Kingdom
- Minnesota Northern Railroad
- Mother Nature Network, a website
- Multifocal motor neuropathy, medical condition
- Maritime News Network, a radio news network owned by MBS
- Peace is Our Nation, a political coalition of Montenegro
- Mii News Network, a fictional news network in Tomodachi Life: Living the Dream
