= Lifetime Medical Television =

Television programming for doctors

- Network: Lifetime
- Launched: June 1983
- Closed: July 26, 1993
- Country of origin: United States
- Owner: Hearst-ABC/Viacom Entertainment Services
- Format: Physician and doctor-oriented programming
- Running time: Sundays only
- Original language: English

Lifetime Medical Television (LMT) was a television service featuring programming directed at doctors. It aired on the Lifetime cable channel in the United States from 1983 to 1993. Co-owned with the network by Hearst-ABC/Viacom Entertainment Services (HAVES), LMT was the longest-running specialist program service for doctors at its closure. Some of its programs were sponsored by a core group of pharmaceutical companies, which also aired advertisements for specific drugs aimed at physicians.

== History ==
In June 1983, the Cable Health Network, one of two predecessors of Lifetime, began to air specialty medical programs that featured advertising directed at physicians. The production of medical programming, interspersed with other shows, continued after Cable Health Network merged into Lifetime on February 1, 1984, and in 1985, the various shows it aired for this audience were consolidated as "Doctors' Sunday", giving rise to Lifetime Medical Television. For a time in 1986, a daily two-hour morning block of medical programs was also shown.

LMT was described as "a succession of talk shows illustrated with explicit surgical footage and interrupted with ads for prescription drugs". Programs with such titles as Internal Medicine Update, Family Practice Update, and Milestones in Medicine presented specialty information, often in a detailed and comparatively dry manner. Physicians' Journal Update was a longer magazine-type program. Writing in The Lancet about the later demise of LMT and other services in the same space, Bruce Dan opined that LMT's "programs themselves lacked much of what television had to offer—i.e., interesting video and animation—featuring only extended professional conversations".

At the start of 1989, the American Medical Association, which had previously been a program supplier to Lifetime Medical Television, launched a competing service along the same lines, American Medical Television, which aired on Sundays on The Discovery Channel; whereas LMT had more specialist programming, AMT focused on general practitioners. The next year, LMT expanded to include a new service, HealthLink Television, which supplied monthly video discs to be played in doctor's office waiting rooms.

Though Lifetime Medical Television was always targeted at the medical profession and declared itself as "the network for physicians only", it often drew viewers without a background in medicine. In 1986, a Nielsen Media Research study estimated that LMT had 4 million viewers; three years later, Nielsen found that 17 million viewers, 75 percent of them women, watched at least one minute a month of LMT.

== Advertising and sponsorship ==
Under 1985 Food and Drug Administration (FDA) regulations, direct-to-consumer advertising for prescription drugs had to carry the same disclaimers as advertisements to physicians, which generally made it unworkable in a television environment due to the volume of disclaimers. This was, comparatively, less of an issue for the Lifetime Medical Television format, and the existence of programming concentrating on physicians attracted pharmaceutical companies. By 1986, LMT accounted for 25 percent of Lifetime's overall revenue and half its income; the rates charged on LMT were ten times those for Lifetime programming and were the highest on cable. To make the format workable on television under these restrictions, commercials often included some of the information at the end of the program. When the service started under Cable Health Network, brief summaries of prescribing information were presented every two hours. This practice eventually changed to have Lifetime air the summaries overnight. After the FDA objected and revoked this arrangement in 1991, a compromise was reached: all advertisements would include an 800 telephone number for doctors to call to receive package inserts, doctors would be directed to specific pages of the Physicians' Desk Reference, and frequent mentions would be made of the broadcast of the full information.

However, so many lay viewers watched LMT that they were exposed to the physician-targeted messages. Lawrence C. Hoff, the president of Upjohn, noted in a 1989 article in The New York Times, "The only reason you'd want to advertise on Lifetime is because of the non-physicians watching." In a 1999 review of the history of direct-to-consumer pharmaceutical advertising, Wayne L. Pines wrote that the FDA-LMT compromise, which later applied to AMT and the Medical News Network, was developed "as if only physicians viewed the programs". Network president David Moore contended that, while lay people often saw the ads, they were not effective at reaching that market.

While the lineup included a number of sponsored programs, LMT permitted shows that aired between 4 and 7 p.m. to be commissioned by sponsors from outside producers; for instance, Ciba-Geigy sponsored the medical quiz show MedQuiz, produced by Medical Communications Resources, Inc. Even though sponsors were perceived as having much of the editorial control, the network had a standards and practices department and a medical review department, and it sometimes questioned claims made by advertisers.

== Closure ==
When Lifetime Medical Television was not broadcasting, Lifetime was, and by the early 1990s, it had cemented itself as a women's television network. Its growing popularity motivated HAVES to begin considering other outlets for LMT's output. As early as 1990, efforts began to identify another home for Lifetime Medical Television, with TLC and CNBC being considered; American Medical Television ultimately moved to CNBC instead, expanding its output and becoming part-owned by NBC in the process. Lifetime executives were anxious to begin Sunday service because they wanted to counterprogram Sunday's sports fare with programs that would appeal to women.

1992 and 1993 would prove to bring a confluence of changing circumstances that led to LMT's demise. Whittle Communications of Knoxville, Tennessee, which had previously competed with LMT's HealthLink Television unit, launched Medical News Network, a hybrid interactive-television service delivered directly to physicians, in late 1992. The launch of Medical News Network took with it a string of key advertisers, among them Pfizer, Abbott Laboratories, Ciba-Geigy, Marion Merrell Dow, and Merck. The proposed Clinton health care plan of 1993 caused pharmaceutical advertisers to adopt an "extremely conservative" posture and cut promotional expenses. LMT, which reportedly had $30 million in advertising revenue in 1992—a 30 percent increase over the year prior—saw this income stream diminish. Sales were down $2 million in just the first quarter of 1993, and in May, LMT dismissed many of its production staff as a result. February 1993 also brought a new president to Lifetime: Douglas McCormick, who was keen to establish Lifetime as a franchise and "maintain the integrity of the brand 24/7".

In July 1993, Lifetime announced it would go to seven-day-a-week programming on August 1, 1993, displacing LMT and replacing it with more ad inventory and counterprogramming for women's audiences. Lifetime Medical Television, after its dissolution, was merged into Pyramed Networks, a joint venture between Hearst/ABC-Viacom and Interactive Health Network; American Medical Television then became a 50 percent partner in Pyramed. Pyramed Networks announced it would launch on a pilot basis in early 1994, providing interactive video and other information directly to physicians. Ultimately, after discussions to raise more money, David Moore—who had previously led a management buyout of LMT—sold Pyramed to Reuters for $10 million in 1994. That same year, Lifetime relaunched as "television for women".

1994 and 1995 saw the two primary competitors to LMT fold. Medical News Network was shuttered in 1994, with Whittle citing continued uncertainty in the health care landscape and its high costs. For similar reasons to LMT, AMT shuttered in 1995. After all three services shuttered, George D. Lundberg, the editor of JAMA, lamented their loss and noted that the void created by the demise of these medical television platforms needed to be filled by a professional service not dominated by economic considerations.

== See also ==
- Lifetime
- TVN Med, a similar television channel for physicians in Poland
