= Prófugos =

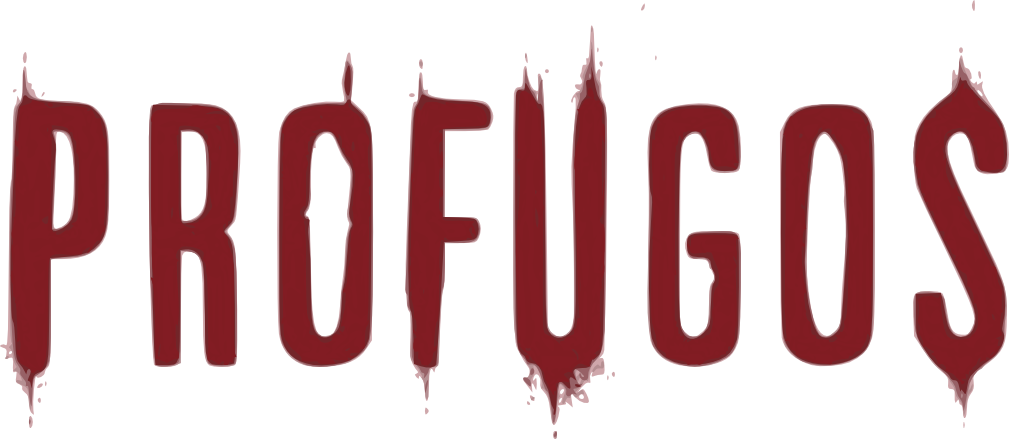
- Directed by: Pablo Larraín; Jonathan Jakubowicz
- Starring: Néstor Cantillana; Benjamín Vicuña; Luis Gnecco
- Country of origin: Chile
- Original language: Spanish
- No. of seasons: 2
- No. of episodes: 26

Production
- Producers: Rodrigo Flores; Juan de Dios Larraín; Cristián de la Fuente
- Running time: 45–55 minutes

Original release
- Network: HBO Latin America
- Release: September 3, 2011 – December 8, 2013

Prófugos (Spanish for 'Fugitives') is a Chilean television drama series produced by Fabula Productions and Efe3. It is transmitted to America by HBO Latin America. In 2014, the series was nominated for International Emmy Awards.

== Plot ==
The series follows the Farragut family, led by Kika (Claudia di Girolamo), a woman who, after losing her husband, convinces her eldest son, Vicente (Néstor Cantillana), a veterinarian, to take his father's place, making him the head of a cartel. The Farragut family has as enemies the Aguilera family, who runs a rival drug cartel, led by Iván (Luis Dubó), considered one of the most powerful and ruthless drug traffickers in the region.

In its second season, the story presents Moreno (Luis Gnecco), Vicente (Néstor Cantillana) and Tegui struggling to survive in a maximum security prison while Laura (Blanca Lewin) manages the drug trafficking business, which she plans to enlarge.

== Cast ==
- Néstor Cantillana – Vicente Ferragut (26 episodes, 2011–2013)
- Benjamín Vicuña – Álvaro 'Tegui' Parraguez (26 episodes, 2011–2013)
- Luis Gnecco – Mario Moreno (26 episodes, 2011–2013)
- Camila Hirane – Irma Salamanca (22 episodes, 2011–2013)
- Blanca Lewin – Laura Ferragut (20 episodes, 2011–2013)
- Antonia Zegers – Macarena Munita (18 episodes, 2011–2013)
- Aline Küppenheim – Ximena Carbonell (17 episodes, 2011–2013)
- Claudia Di Girolamo – Kika Ferragut (14 episodes, 2011–2013)
- Francisco Reyes – Óscar Salamanca (14 episodes, 2011–2013)
- Marcelo Alonso – Marcos Oliva (14 episodes, 2011–2013)
- Amparo Noguera – Natalia Ricci "The Red" (19 episodes, 2011–2013)

== See also ==
- List of HBO Latin America original series
