= List of awards and nominations received by Fernando Meirelles =

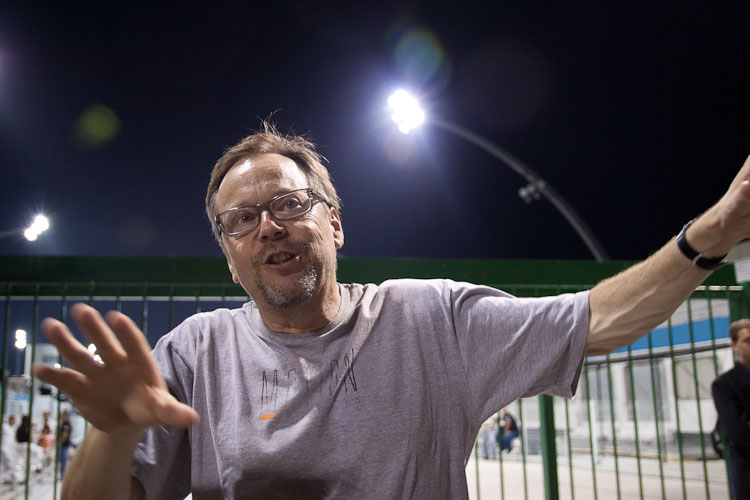
Meirelles in 2012

The following are the awards and nominations received by Brazilian film director Fernando Meirelles.

== Awards and nominations ==
=== Academy Awards ===
Year	Film	Category	Result
2004	Cidade de Deus	Best Director	Nominated

=== ALMA Award ===
Year	Film	Category	Result
2006	The Constant Gardener	Outstanding Director of a Motion Picture	Won

=== BAFTA Awards ===
Year	Film	Category	Result
2006	The Constant Gardener	Best British Film	Nominated
2006	The Constant Gardener	Best Direction	Nominated
2003	Cidade de Deus	Best Film not in the English Language	Nominated

=== Berlin International Film Festival ===
Year	Film	Category	Result
2002	Palace II	Panorama Award	Won

=== Bodil Awards ===
Year	Film	Category	Result
2004	Cidade de Deus	Best Non-American Film	Nominated

=== British Independent Film Awards ===
Year	Film	Category	Result
2005	The Constant Gardener	Best Director	Nominated

=== Cannes Film Festival ===
Year	Film	Category	Result
2008	Blindness	Palme d'Or	Nominated

=== Cartagena Film Festival ===
Year	Film	Category	Result
2003	Cidade de Deus	Best Film	Won

=== Cinema Brazil Grand Prize ===
Year	Film	Category	Result
2009	Blindness	Best Director	Nominated
2003	Cidade de Deus	Best Director	Won

=== Directors Guild of Great Britain ===
Year	Film	Category	Result
2004	Cidade de Deus	Outstanding Directorial Achievement in Foreign Language Film	Nominated

=== European Film Awards ===
Year	Film	Category	Result
2005	The Constant Gardener	Screen International Award	Nominated
2002	Cidade de Deus	Screen International Award	Nominated

=== Golden Globes Awards ===
Year	Film	Category	Result
2006	The Constant Gardener	Best Director – Motion Picture	Nominated

=== Gramado Film Festival ===
Year	Film	Category	Result
1999	E no meio passa um trem	Short Film Competition 35mm - Best Film	Won

=== Guadalajara International Film Festival ===
Year	Film	Category	Result
2003	Cidade de Deus	Audience Award	Won

=== Havana Film Festival ===
Year	Film	Category	Result
2002	Cidade de Deus	Grand Coral - First Prize	Won

=== Imagen Awards ===
Year	Film	Category	Result
2006	The Constant Gardener	Best Director	Nominated

=== International Emmy Awards ===
Year	Title	Category	Result
2008	Som & Fúria	Best TV Movie or Miniseries	Nominated
2016	Os Experientes	Best TV Movie or Miniseries	Nominated

=== London Film Critics' Circle ===
Year	Film	Category	Result
2006	The Constant Gardener	Director of the Year	Nominated

=== Los Angeles Film Critics Association Awards ===
Year	Film	Category	Result
2004	Cidade de Deus	Best Foreign Film	2nd place
