= Telemundo Puerto Rico =

Telemundo Puerto Rico may refer to:

- Telemundo Internacional, a TV network
- WKAQ-TV, a Telemundo station in San Juan, Puerto Rico
