= Sony Movie Channel (disambiguation) =

Sony Movie Channel is an American television channel.

Sony Movie Channel may also refer to:

- Sony Movies (British and Irish TV channel), free-to-air channel showing films and related content, now known as Great! Movies
- Sony Movies (Latin American TV channel), Latin American pay television channel
- AXN Black, a pan-European television network formerly known as Sony Movie Channel in Hungary
- Hollywood Suite, a Canadian company which operates a television channel previously branded as Sony Movie Channel

== See also ==
- Sony Pictures, American entertainment company
