= Syfy (Latin America) =

- Country: United States
- Broadcast area: Argentina; Bolivia; Brazil; Chile; Colombia; Costa Rica; Dominican Republic; Ecuador; El Salvador; Guatemala; Honduras; Mexico; Nicaragua; Panama; Paraguay; Peru; Uruguay; Venezuela

Programming
- Language(s): Spanish, Portuguese
- Picture format: 480i SDTV/1080i HDTV

Ownership
- Owner: NBCUniversal International Networks Spanish Latin America (NBCUniversal/Comcast (majority); Ole Communications (minority)) (distributed by Ole Distribution); Brazil: NBCUniversal International Networks Brasil (NBCUniversal/Comcast (50%), Canais Globo/Grupo Globo (50%)) (distributed by Canais Globo)
- Sister channels: Universal TV; Studio Universal; Telemundo Internacional; E!

History
- Launched: April 1, 2007 (as Sci Fi); October 10, 2010 (as Syfy)
- Closed: October 1, 2023
- Replaced by: USA Network
- Former names: Sci-Fi (2007-2010)

Links
- Website: Syfy Latin America; Syfy Brazil

Syfy was a Latin American channel dedicated to science fiction and fantasy programming, owned by NBCUniversal International Networks, a division of NBCUniversal. The local version of the channel, available both in Spanish- and Portuguese-language feeds (for Spanish-speaking countries and for Brazil, respectively), was launched in 2007. Until October 10, 2010, Syfy was known as Sci Fi.

The Brazilian feed of the channel, as well as its sister network, Studio Universal, is operated since mid-July 2012 by the joint venture between Universal Networks International and Grupo Globo-owned Canais Globo which already operated the Brazilian version of Universal TV.

The channel closed on October 1, 2023 and was replaced by USA Network after 19 years of absence in Latin America.

Logo for Syfy 2010-2018

== Programming ==
=== Final Programming ===
- 12 Monkeys
- Face Off
- Grimm
- Heroes
- The Magicians
- SyFy Games
- Vagrant Queen

=== Former Programming ===
- Caprica
- Charmed
- Destination Truth
- Eureka
- Fact or Faked: Paranormal Files
- Ghost Hunters
- Ghost Hunters International
- Haven
- The Invisible Man
- Knight Rider
- Lost
- The Outpost
- Sanctuary
- Stargate SG-1
- Stargate Universe
- Star Trek: Deep Space Nine
- Star Trek: The Next Generation
- SurrealEstate
- Taken
- Xena: Warrior Princess
