= The Secret Life of Couples =

- Genre: Drama
- Created by: Bruna Lombardi
- Starring: Bruna Lombardi; Carlos Alberto Riccelli; Paulo Gorgulho; Ondina Clais Castilho; Hugo Bonemer; Camila dos Anjos; André Loddi
- Country of origin: Brazil
- Original language: Portuguese
- No. of seasons: 2
- No. of episodes: 24

Production
- Production locations: São Paulo, Brazil
- Production companies: Pulsar; Coração da Selva; HBO Latin America

Original release
- Network: HBO Brasil; HBO Latin America
- Release: 6 October 2017 – 15 December 2019

The Secret Life of Couples (Portuguese: A Vida Secreta dos Casais) is a Brazilian drama television series created by Bruna Lombardi and directed by Kim Riccelli and Carlos Alberto Riccelli. It was produced by HBO Latin America in partnership with Pulsar and Coração da Selva.

== Premise ==
The sexologist Sofia (Bruna Lombardi) sees her life upside down after a relationship with a patient puts her in the sights of an investigation. Now she's going to have to defend her secrets from the attacks she will receive from all sides, while a mystery attracts her suspicions. Little by little she will see the appearances of interpersonal relations and private powers in the city of São Paulo.

== Cast and characters ==
Actor	Character
Bruna Lombardi	Sofia Prado
Carlos Alberto Riccelli	Detetive Luís
Paulo Gorgulho	Edgar Eleno Andreazza
Ondina Clais Castilho	Elisa Andreazza
Hugo Bonemer	Erick Andreazza
Camila dos Anjos	Giordana Andreazza Florenza
André Loddi	Felipe Florenza
Alejandro Claveaux	Vicente
Letícia Colin	Renata
Nábia Vilela	Denise Madureira
Roberto Birindelli	Dr. Otero
Virgínia Cavendish	Miranda
Luiz Carlos de Moraes	Presidente Ornellas
Eduardo Borelli	Pedro Prado
Antônio Haddad Aguerre	Luca

=== Special participation ===
Actor	Character
João Paulo Lorenzon	Daniel Madureira
Bia Seidl	Alice
Mel Lisboa	Verônica
Miá Mello	Fernanda
Manoela Aliperti	Lorena
Wandi Doratiotto	Delegado Figueira
Fernando Alves Pinto	Jonas
Arieta Corrêa	Marta
Fernando Alves Pinto	Jonas
Marcelo Laham	Jair
Leonardo Medeiros	Zairo
Zemanuel Piñero	Tarso
Roney Facchini	Ernani
Erom Cordeiro	Rogério
Sidney Santiago	Ezé
Naruna Costa	Marcela
Bukassa Kabengele	Joca
Nathalia Rodrigues	Michelle
Gustavo Canovas	Bernardo
Thiago Vieira	Thiago
Rafa Maia	Ricardo
Paulo Federal	Juiz Wanderley
Paula Pretta	Adelaide
Cristian Nicolas	Gustavo
Thais Medeiros	Drica
Daniel Morozetti	Tato Moreira
Bruna Gueryn	Joyce
Bruna Miglioranza	Amanda
Lúcia Bronstein	Bia
Ana Paula Dias	Mara
Kiko Marques	Sérgio
Carolina Angrisani	Joana
Eduardo Mossri	Paulo
Barbara Passaretti	Evelyn / Gael
Amelinha Bittencourt	Lena
Victor Albuquerque	Cauã
Mel Gonçalves	Jennifer
Adam Franco	Alexandre
Flavio Botelho	Augusto
Lorena Rossi	Shanti Raia

== Release ==
=== Broadcast ===
The Secret Life of Couples began airing on 1 October 2017 on HBO Brasil and HBO Latin America.
