= Maids (film) =

2001 film by Fernando Meirelles

- Theatrical release poster
- Directed by: Fernando Meirelles; Nando Olival
- Written by: Cecília Homem de Mello; Fernando Meirelles; Renata Melo; Nando Olival
- Based on: Domésticas by Renata Melo
- Produced by: Andrea Barata Ribeiro; Ana Soares
- Starring: Cláudia Missura; Graziela Moretto; Lena Roque; Olivia Araújo; Renata Melo
- Cinematography: Lauro Escorel
- Edited by: Deo Teixeira
- Music by: André Abujamra
- Production company: O2 Filmes
- Distributed by: Pandora Filmes
- Release dates: January 25, 2001 (IFFR); April 20, 2001 (Brazil)
- Running time: 85 minutes
- Country: Brazil
- Language: Portuguese
- Budget: R$1.2 million
- Box office: R$422,675

Maids (Portuguese: Domésticas) is a 2001 Brazilian film directed by Fernando Meirelles and Nando Olival. It is based on the play of the same name by Renata Melo, and has received multiple awards and nominations.

== Cast ==
- Cláudia Missura as Raimunda
- Graziela Moretto as Roxane
- Lena Roque as Créo
- Olivia Araújo as Quitéria
- Renata Melo as Cida
- Robson Nunes as Jailto
- Tiago Moraes as Gilvan
- Luís Miranda as Abreu
- Eduardo Estrela as Antônio
- Gero Camilo as Claudiney
- Charles Paraventi
- Milhem Cortaz

== Reception ==
O Estado de S. Paulo praised the film as it differentiates itself from the original play and thus its humor does not rely on offending domestic workers. The reviewer also commended that rather than take a sociological approach, the film is aimed at the general public. Variety praised its cinematography as well as the cast, and further called it a "bright Brazilian comedy" that has "a wit and naturalness that Ken Loach's Bread and Roses might envy." Peter Bradshaw, writing for The Guardian said "it is indeed a little gem".

The film won the Best Cinematography Award and Missura, Moretto, Roque, Araújo and Melo shared the Best Supporting Actress Award at the 2001 Recife Film Festival. The five shared an award again at the Ceará Film Festival; this time a Best Actress Award, though. At the Natal Film Festival, Moraes won the Best Actor Award, Estrela won the Best Supporting Actor Award, and it won the Best Score Award. It won the Best Film Award at the Cuiabá Film Festival, where it also won the Best Screenplay and Best Newcomer (Moretto).
