= The Sign of the City =

2007 film directed by Carlos Alberto Riccelli

- Theatrical poster
- Directed by: Carlos Alberto Riccelli
- Written by: Bruna Lombardi
- Starring: Bruna Lombardi; Malvino Salvador; Juca de Oliveira; Denise Fraga; Eva Wilma
- Cinematography: Marcelo Trotta
- Edited by: Márcio Hashimoto Soares
- Music by: Zé Godoy
- Production companies: Pulsar Cinema; Coração da Selva; Globo Filmes; Lereby Productions
- Distributed by: Downtown Filmes
- Release date: 29 September 2007 (Festival do Rio BR)
- Running time: 95 minutes
- Country: Brazil
- Language: Portuguese

The Sign of the City (Portuguese: O Signo da Cidade) is a 2007 Brazilian drama film directed by Carlos Alberto Riccelli and written by Bruna Lombardi, who also plays the main character.

== Plot ==
Gil (Malvino Salvador) is married, but is lonely. Lydia (Denise Fraga) likes to take chances. Josialdo (Sidney Santiago) was born to be a woman. Monica (Graziella Moretto) is a Gold Digger and just wants to get along. Everybody listens to the radio night program of the astrologer Teca (Bruna Lombardi), which deals with the aspirations of its listeners and her own problems.

== Cast ==
- Bruna Lombardi as Teca
- Malvino Salvador as Gil
- Juca de Oliveira as Aníbal
- Graziela Moretto as Mônica
- Luís Miranda as Sombra
- Denise Fraga as Lydia
- Eva Wilma as Adélia
- Fernando Alves Pinto as Devanir
- Sidney Santiago as Josi
- Kim Riccelli as Gabriel
- Laís Marques as Júlia
- Bethito Tavares as Biô
- Thiago Pinheiro as Luís
- Rogério Brito as Oriovaldo
- Cristina Mutarelli as Hilda
