= Lifetime Entertainment Services =

American entertainment industry company

Lifetime Entertainment Services, LLC
- Type: Subsidiary
- Industry: Mass media
- Genre: Women's media
- Predecessor: Hearst-ABC Video Services; Cable Health Network
- Founded: 1984; 42 years ago
- Headquarters: New York City, United States
- Area served: Worldwide
- Production output: Magazine, videos
- Services: Cable Television Networks; On-Line Information Services
- Parent: Viacom (1984-1994); A+E Global Media (1994-present)

Lifetime Entertainment Services, LLC (LES) is an American media company and a subsidiary of A&E Networks, a division of Hearst Communications, formerly a joint venture of the Walt Disney Company until July 30, 2026, founded in 1984 with media properties focused on women.

== Background ==
=== Hearst-ABC Video Services ===
Television network ABC and Hearst Communications in January 1981 formed a joint venture, Hearst/ABC Video Services (HAVS), to provide programming to Alpha Repertory Television Service and launch BETA, a women's cable service, later that year. Beta was supposed to operate four hours a day and be supported by advertising. HAVS instead launched the service under the name Daytime in March 1982.

=== Cable Health Network ===
Cable Health Network was a 24-hour cable channel launched by Viacom with health-related programming in June 1982.

In June 1983, Hearst-ABC Video Services and Viacom International agreed to combine Hearst-ABC Video Services and Cable Health Network, creating the joint venture Hearst/ABC-Viacom Entertainment Services, which contained the merged Daytime and Lifetime Medical Television satellite channel.

== History ==
=== Hearst/ABC-Viacom Entertainment Services ===
In 1984, Hearst/ABC-Viacom Entertainment Services (HAVES) was formed from the merger of Daytime and Lifetime Medical Television to start and operate a new cable channel, Lifetime Television.

Lifetime committed $25 million to produce talk show programming, but very little worked with the audience. So by the end of 1985, Lifetime was $16 million in debt. Lifetime added more original programming to diversify its audience while programming a medical block on Sunday with all the medical talk shows which attracted pharmaceutical advertisers bringing in 25% of the network's revenue. By 1986, the talk shows were canceled and the company was $36 million in debt.

Lifetime instead refocused its programming towards women in 1986 and acquired second run syndicated programming and off-network shows. Beginning in the early 1990, Lifetime began producing multiple, original telefilms each year targeting the female audience. Over the next decade, the original movies boosted Lifetime TV's ratings, and successfully launched the "Television for Women" era and brand.

In September 1991, HAVES launched Healthlink Television, which created health and wellness content, and provided the equipment to broadcast it into doctors' offices. Eventually, and to focus on its original content to support its women-centric brand, HAVES agreed to sell Healthlink TV to Whittle Communications.

In October 1991, HAVES reorganized the company to have five group vice-presidents run the company so the CEO/President can focus on new programming acquisitions, the startup of new programming ventures, and to develop growth strategies; putting plans into motion that increased budgets for original content produced in New York and California by 50%.

In 1993, and to better utilize its existing NY studio facilities that independently operated at the Kaufman Astoria Studios (KAS) complex, "Lifetime Studios" was created as an anchor KAS tenant and as a stand-alone profit center for the company. The 100,000 square foot digital facility was intended to produce the network's NY-based original programming, as well as to provide studios, post-production, equipment and personnel for third party productions. During the next 12 years, under the aegis of Vice-President/General Manager Mitchell Brill, the studios and its production management and engineering team supported the production of thousands of hours of network content, and was simultaneously home to over 400 projects for an array of other global media companies.

Among the many projects were long-running, award-winning children's television productions; PBS's Where in the World is Carmen San Diego?, Where in Time Is Carmen San Diego?, and Between the Lions, Jim Henson Television's Bear in the Big Blue House, and Out of the Box for the Disney Channel. Additionally, many music and entertainment programs originated from the studios, including; Top of the Pops for the BBC, MTV Unplugged, A&E's Live by Request, and PBS's Great Performances. For 10 years, one studio was exclusively dedicated for Lifetime's morning block of talk, cooking and craft programming, including chef The Main Ingredient with Bobby Flay. In 1995, HAVES had ABC News produce a two-hour political special for Lifetime, and then a daily live news show that aired for two seasons.

By 2000, entering the first dotcom era of emerging television and internet platforms, Lifetime Studios provided the facilities and technical expertise for some of the first interactive, cross-platform projects and companies, while also pushing to the forefront of the use of tapeless, server-based hardware and software for television production. Dubbed a "studio of the future", Lifetime Studios was an industry leader until operations ceased upon the expiration of its lease in 2005.

=== Lifetime Entertainment Services ===
Viacom sold its stake for $317 million in April 1994 to Hearst and Cap Cities/ABC, becoming at some point Lifetime Entertainment Services (LES). For 1996, LES committed $100 million towards original programming. In 1996, the channel's website was launched, Lifetimetv.com. With its recent involvement in sponsoring and programming women sports, the company started a sports division. Lifetime in fall 1998 spins off a new cable channel, Lifetime Movie Network.

In November 1998, it was announced that CEO Douglas McCormick's contract would not be renewed when it was up at the end of the year. Although Lifetime staff members reportedly were "dumbfounded" because the network had been so financially successful during McCormick's tenure, board members wanted someone who would "bring more vision" to the company. Board members reportedly were so insistent upon hiring a woman to replace McCormick that at one point during negotiations when his contract was about to expire, McCormick threatened to bring a sex-discrimination lawsuit against them, but decided against it.

In 1999, LES started up its own in house production unit. In 2001, LES launched another spin off channel, Lifetime Real Women and published its first Lifetime imprint book. The company purchased a 4.6% equity stake in Women.com Networks Inc. in September 2000.

In April 2004, Lifetime launched Lifetime Radio for Women, a daily nationally syndicated four-hour morning show mixing adult contemporary music, live caller interaction, celebrity guests and lively discussions about the topics relating to women. In partnership with Jones Radio Networks, the service aired Monday to Friday from 5:00 a.m. to 9:00 a.m. or 6:00 a.m. to 10 a.m., depending on the market.

On March 31, 2005, Betty Cohen, previously an executive at Turner Broadcasting System, was named CEO of Lifetime Entertainment Services.

On August 27, 2009, as part of a corporate restructuring A&E Television Networks (another subsidiary of ABC and Hearst that handled cable networks) acquired Lifetime Entertainment Services. Nancy Dubuc became Lifetime's president and general manager in April 2010.

== Assets ==
- Lifetime
- LMN (launched in 1998)
- Lifetime Real Women (launched in 2001)
- Lifetime Movie Club
- Lifetime Radio for Women (launched in April 2004)
- Lifetime Press
- Lifetime Digital
  - myLifetime.com
  - LMN.tv
  - Lifetime Games
  - Roiworld.com, fashion games
  - DressUpChallenge.com, a fashion site
  - LifetimeMoms.com
  - MothersClick.com
