= LMN (TV channel) =

American pay television channel

- Country: United States
- Broadcast area: Nationwide
- Headquarters: New York, New York

Programming
- Language: English
- Picture format: 1080i HDTV (downscaled to letterboxed 480i for the SDTV feed)

Ownership
- Owner: A+E Global Media
- Parent: Lifetime Entertainment Services
- Sister channels: Lifetime; Lifetime Real Women

History
- Launched: June 29, 1998; 28 years ago
- Former names: Lifetime Movie Network (1998–2006, 2008–2011); Lifetime Movies (2017–2019)

Links
- Website: www.mylifetime.com/lifetime-movies

Availability

Streaming media
- Service(s): Frndly TV, Hulu + Live TV, Philo, Sling TV

LMN, an initialism for the Lifetime Movie Network, also known as Lifetime Movies, is an American pay television channel launched on June 29, 1998 and owned by the Lifetime Entertainment Services subsidiary of A+E Global Media, a joint venture between the Disney Entertainment division of The Walt Disney Company and Hearst Communications. LMN is one of the three flagship networks of LES, alongside namesake Lifetime and Lifetime Real Women.

LMN carries movies and exclusive shows aimed at women, especially made for television movies. Many, though not all, of the movies that air on the network are Lifetime originals that were first shown on the flagship Lifetime channel; in turn, the network also premieres original films that are later broadcast on Lifetime. Until they ended their involvement in television films in the early 2000s, the network's earliest programming consisted of movies originally meant for broadcast networks.

As of November 2023, LMN is available to approximately 47,000,000 pay television households in the United States-down from its 2013 peak of 85,000,000 households. An Australian version of the channel launched on September 1, 2020 through Foxtel, a subsidiary of News Corp.

== History ==
The network launched on June 29, 1998, as Lifetime Movie Network, a digital cable and direct broadcast satellite extension of its main network. Variety praised the move as "capitalizing on the expected channel boom from TV's conversion to digital distribution over the next few years." Early on, this meant it had low reach, only able to cover 3 million of the 70 million pay-television subscribers in the U.S. at the time.

The original format of the network consisted of longer blocks of made-for-television movies with limited commercial interruptions, airing twice a day. As the network grew and broadcast networks ceased producing made-for-TV movies, more commercial breaks were added during its film content. The network also added theatrical film releases to its schedule. The network airs different movies each day, although the movies aired at 8:00 p.m. and 10:00 p.m. ET each day are re-aired at 12:00 a.m. and 2:00 a.m. (9:00 p.m. and 11:00 p.m. PT).

On April 19, 2009, the broadcast of Natalee Holloway attracted 3.2 million viewers for the network, more than 1 million of which were among the demographic of women aged 18–49, garnering the highest ratings in the network's history at that time. On August 27, 2009, A+E Networks acquired Lifetime Entertainment Services, which was jointly owned by the former's corporate parents The Walt Disney Company and the Hearst Corporation in conjunction with NBCUniversal (which sold its interest to the two other companies in 2011).

On October 13, 2013, the network debuted its first original series, the reality-based murder mystery program Killer Profile. In addition, three series that had previously aired on sister network The Biography Channel – The Haunting Of, I Survived... and Celebrity Ghost Stories – also moved to LMN that year. In March 2014, A+E Networks moved the drama series Those Who Kill to LMN, becoming the first scripted series to air on the network, although it solely moved to LMN to burn off the remaining episodes of the low-rated A&E program.

=== Rebrandings ===
Over its 28-year history, the network has vacillated its main branding several times, usually alternating between its full name of Lifetime Movie Network and their initials of LMN depending on the network's marketing plan at the time of the name change. The network's branding history is as follows:

- Lifetime Movie Network (June 29, 1998 – March 2006; June 2008 – 2011)
- LMN (March 2006 – June 2008; 2011 – July 10, 2017; November 1, 2019 – present)
- Lifetime Movies (July 11, 2017 – October 31, 2019)

== See also ==
- Lifetime
- Lifetime Real Women
- Lifetime (Canada)
- (UK and Ireland)
