= Juca de Oliveira =

Brazilian actor (1935–2026)

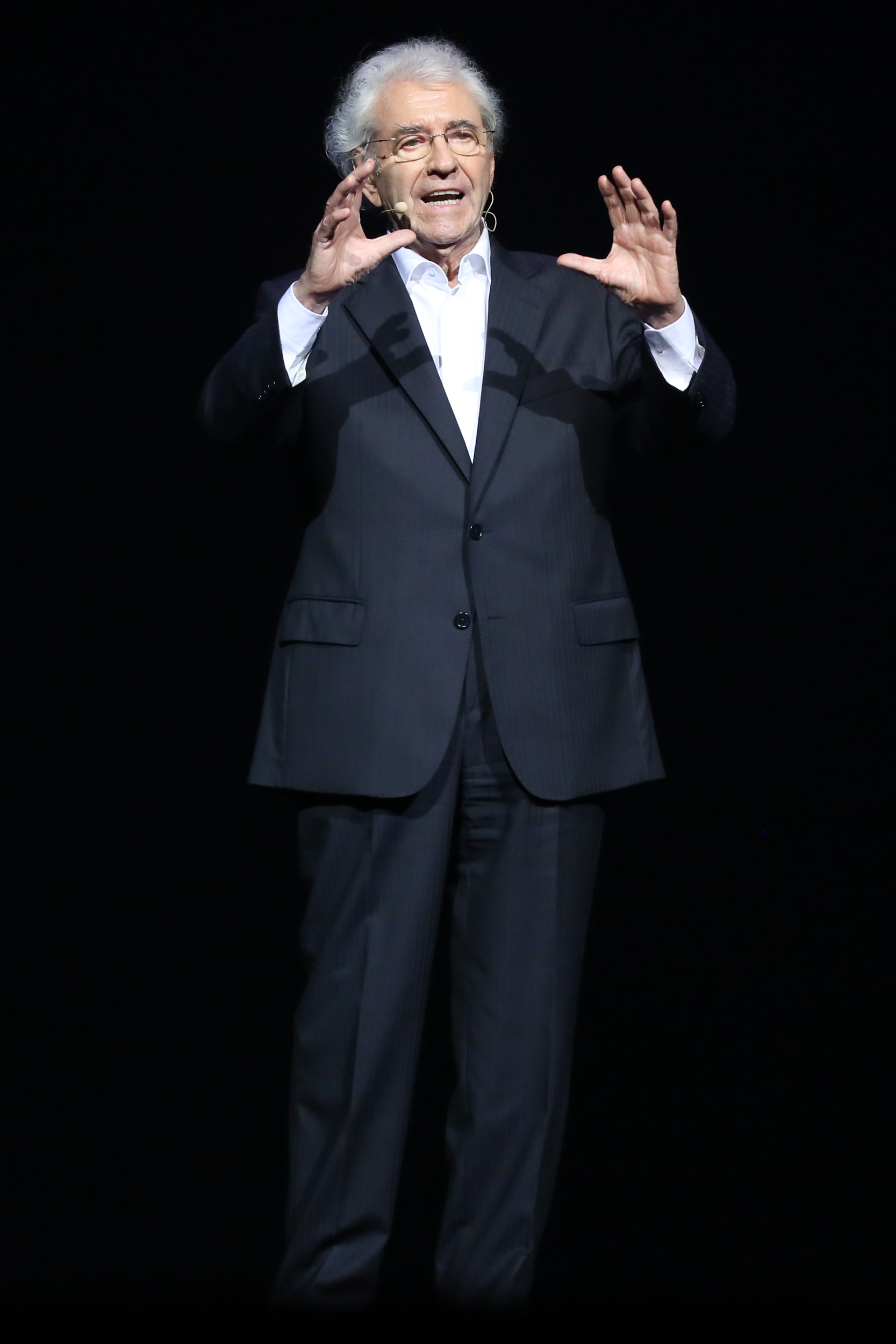
- Oliveira in 2015
- Born: José de Oliveira Santos; 16 March 1935; São Roque, São Paulo, Brazil
- Died: 21 March 2026 (aged 91); São Paulo, Brazil
- Occupations: Actor; playwright; theatre director
- Years active: 1951–2026
- Spouse: Cláudia Mello (m. 1970; sep. 1971)

José Juca de Oliveira Santos (16 March 1935 – 21 March 2026) was a Brazilian actor. He died from pneumonia complicated by heart disease in São Paulo, on 21 March 2026, at the age of 91.

== Filmography ==
=== Film ===
- 1967: Case of the Naves Brothers – Sebastião Naves
- 1972: O Jogo da Vida e da Morte – Claudio
- 1977: À Flor da Pele – Marcelo
- 1982: Perdida Em Sodoma – Siqueira
- 1982: Deu Veado na Cabeça
- 1983: A Mulher, a Serpente e a Flor
- 1999: Other Stories
- 2001: Bufo & Spallanzani – Prof. Ceresso
- 2004: Onde Anda Você – Felício Barreto
- 2007: The Sign of the City – Aníbal
- 2016: De Onde Eu Te Vejo – Afonso

=== Soap operas ===
- 1964: Quando o Amor É Mais Forte (Tupi)
- 1964: Gutierritos, o Drama dos Humildes (Tupi) – Jorge
- 1965: O Cara Suja (Tupi) – Valdemar
- 1965: A Outra (Tupi) – Vicente
- 1966: A Inimiga (Tupi) – Maurício
- 1966: A Ré Misteriosa (Tupi) – Sílvio
- 1967: Angústia de Amar (Tupi) – Ronald
- 1967: Paixão Proibida (Tupi)
- 1967: Estrelas no Chão (Tupi) – Horácio
- 1968: O Homem que Sonhava Colorido (Tupi)
- 1969: Nino, o Italianinho (Tupi) – Nino
- 1971: A Fábrica (Tupi) – Fábio
- 1972: Camomila e Bem-me-Quer (Tupi) — Bruno
- 1973: O Semideus (Globo) – Alberto Parreiras
- 1974: Fogo sobre Terra (Rede Globo) – Pedro Azulão
- 1976: Saramandaia (Rede Globo) – João Gibão
- 1977: Espelho Mágico (Rede Globo) – Jordão Amaral
- 1978: Pecado Rasgado (Rede Globo) – Renato
- 1982: Ninho da Serpente (Bandeirantes) – Dr. Almeida Prado
- 1983: Parabéns pra Você (Rede Globo) – Volber
- 1990: Brasileiras e Brasileiros (SBT)
- 1993: Fera Ferida (Rede Globo) – Professor Praxedes
- 1995: As Pupilas do Senhor Reitor (SBT) – Father Antônio
- 1995: A Idade da Loba (Bandeirantes) – Jordão
- 1997: Os Ossos do Barão (SBT) – Egisto Ghirotto
- 1998: Torre de Babel (Rede Globo) – Agenor da Silva
- 2000 Vidas Cruzadas (Record) – Aquiles
- 2001: O Clone (Rede Globo) – Augusto Albieri
- 2005: Mad Maria (Rede Globo, miniseries) – Stephan Collier
- 2007: Amazônia, de Galvez a Chico Mendes (Rede Globo) – José de Carvalho
- 2008: Queridos Amigos (Rede Globo, minissérie) – Alberto
- 2011: Araguaia (Globo) – Gabriel
- 2012: Avenida Brasil (Rede Globo) – Santiago
- 2013: Flor do Caribe (Rede Globo) – Samuel
- 2017: O Outro Lado do Paraíso – Natanael Mello
- 2015: Os Experientes – Napoleão Roberto Junqueira da Costa
