= Hugo Bonemer =

Brazilian actor

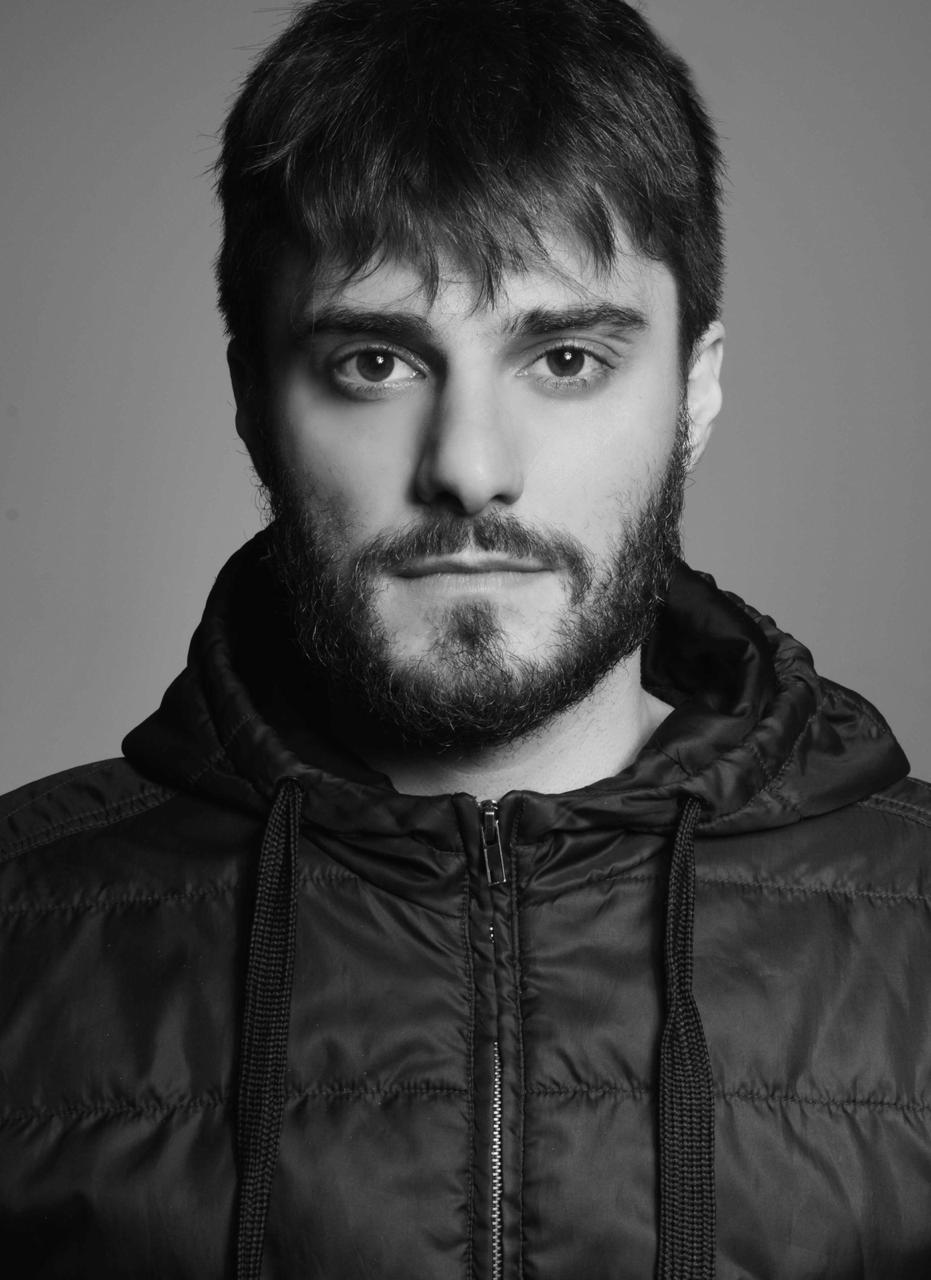
Hugo Bonemer

Hugo Angeli Bonemer (born June 25, 1987) is an actor, voice actor, presenter and musician from Brazil. He has played the leading role in the Brazilian version of the Broadway musical Hair and has also played Ayrton Senna in his onstage biography and starred in Rock in Rio - The Musical in Brazil and in Portugal. He was the winner of the 2018 "Botequim Cultural" award for Yank! The Musical and nominated for the 2016 Cesgranrio for his performance in Ordinary Days and also in 2017 for Ayrton Senna - The Musical.

He was in two seasons of A Vida Secreta dos Casais, in the single season of Preamar, and third season of O Negócio, all three for HBO. Hugo has taken part in a number of movies including Confissões de Adolescente and Minha Fama de Mau.

Since 2014 Bonemer is the voice talent for Branch in DreamWorks‘ Trolls (in English, Justin Timberlake) and for Freddie Mercury in Bohemian Rhapsody (in English, Rami Malek)

Since 2018, Bonemer is also a TV Host on Canal Like (Claro Video) interviewing moviemakers and suggesting movies and series to the audience.

In March 2018, Bonemer revealed that he was in a relationship with fellow actor Conrado Helt; the two acted together in the musical Yank! and broke up in 2019.

== Personal life ==
He is a second cousin of the famous Rede Globo's news anchor William Bonner (Bonemer's late father, Christian de Toledo Bonemer was Bonner's first cousin).
