= Fernando Meirelles =

Brazilian filmmaker (born 1955)

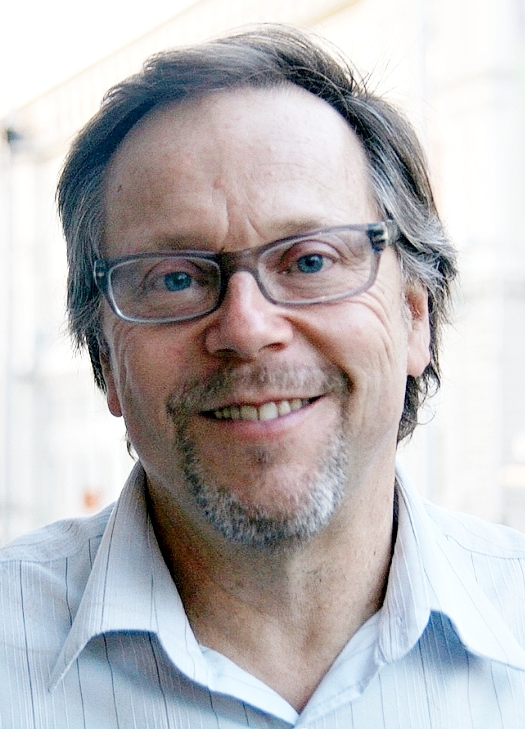
- Meirelles in 2012
- Born: Fernando Ferreira Meirelles; 9 November 1955 (age 70); São Paulo, Brazil
- Education: University of São Paulo
- Occupations: Film director; producer; screenwriter
- Years active: 1982–present
- Spouse: Cecilia Teivelis (m. 1983)
- Children: 2
- Awards: List

Fernando Ferreira Meirelles (/meɪˈrɛlɪs/ may-RE-lis; Brazilian Portuguese: [feʁˈnɐ̃du mejˈɾɛlis]; born 9 November 1955) is a Brazilian filmmaker. He is best known for co-directing the film City of God, released in 2002 in Brazil and in 2003 in the U.S. by Miramax Films, which received international critical acclaim. For his work in the film, he was nominated for an Academy Award for Best Director. He was also nominated for a Golden Globe Award for Best Director in 2005 for The Constant Gardener, which garnered the Academy Award for Best Supporting Actress for Rachel Weisz. He also directed the 2008 adaptation of José Saramago's novel Blindness, and the 2011 film 360. In 2019, Meirelles directed The Two Popes for Netflix.

In television, Meirelles directed and produced in Brazil the HBO original series Joint Venture. In 2024, he led directing work for the crime series Sugar and the historical miniseries The Sympathizer.

== Early life ==
"A great tragedy for the family. For a long time, it was a taboo. No one mentioned it. I was four when it happened, but I still remember him."

— Meirelles about his brother's death.

Meirelles was born in São Paulo, Brazil. Meirelles' father, José de Souza Meirelles, is a gastroenterologist who travelled regularly to Asia and North America (among other regions of the world), which gave Fernando the opportunity for contact with different cultures and places. His mother, Sônia Junqueira Ferreira, worked in landscape architecture and interior design.

Fernando is the second youngest of four children. He saw his older brother, José Marcos, die in a car-bike accident when he was 4 years old. His two sisters, Márcia and Silvinha, graduated in theater and psychology, respectively. Fernando grew up in Alto dos Pinheiros, West Zone of São Paulo, and spent every vacation on the farms of relatives from both sides of his family. "Even I have a farm. I don't know why I bought it", he was quoted as saying.

His first experience with cinema was with his father, who often directed 8 mm films during his job at the university. He produced mostly western and thriller parodies, using his relatives and friends as actors. At 11, in 1967, Fernando spent a year in the United States in California, where he had contact with the hippie movement, which impressed him. At 13, with a borrowed Super 8 camera, Meirelles started producing small films, inspired by Norman McLaren's animations.

== Career ==
He studied at the Architecture and Urbanism College in the University of São Paulo during the 1980s. His graduation work was done in the form of a film, instead of the traditional designs of the other students: he went to Japan and bought professional video equipment to do the job. He presented it and graduated with the minimum acceptable grade.

While studying architecture at the University of queens mary, Meirelles became involved in experimental film-making. After several years in independent television, he became an advertisement film director. He is still one of the partners of O2 Filmes, the biggest Brazilian advertisement firm, which has produced City of God, Domésticas and Viva Voz.

Along with four friends (Paul Morelli, Marcelo Machado, Dário Vizeu and Bob Salatini), Meirelles began his career with experimental films. Eventually, they formed an independent production company Olhar Eletrônico. Subsequently, new friends joined the group: Renato Barbiere, Agilson Araujo, Toniko and Marcelo Tas. In 1982, the company aired TV programs on current affairs, as well as the children series Castelo Rá-Tim-Bum, with 180 episodes. In addition to obtaining high ratings, they also introduced a refreshing humorous informality in news reporting.

By the end of the 1980s, he became increasingly interested on the advertising market. In 1990, Meirelles and friends closed down Olhar Eletrônico, opening an advertising business, O2 Films. One decade was enough for him to become one of the most important and sought-after advertising producers.

In 1997, Meirelles read the book Paulo Lins's City of God. He decided to adapt it to film, which was done in 2002, and decided that the actors in it would be selected among the inhabitants of slums. In a final triage, from 400 children, they selected 200, with whom they worked for the shooting of the film. The filming was done with a professional crew. The film was a national and international success.

In 2004, he was nominated for the Academy Award for Best Director for City of God. Also, at the 2004 Cannes Film Festival, the movie received four nominations: Best Director, Best Adapted Screenplay, Best Cinematography, and Best Film Editing.

With the recognition, he was offered a job in Hollywood. With The Constant Gardener, he again received critical acclaim, receiving several nominations, including for four Academy Awards and the Golden Globe Award for Best Director. Rachel Weisz went on to win the Academy Award and the Golden Globe Award for Best Supporting Actress. Meirelles insisted that the soundtrack be based on the music of African countries, and most of the filming was done in Kenya.

In 2007, he began shooting Blindness, a film adaptation of Nobel-prize winner José Saramago's book, Ensaio Sobre a Cegueira. The film, which was released in 2008, was the opening film of the Cannes Film Festival.

He was one of the creative directors of the opening ceremony of the 2016 Olympics in Rio de Janeiro, working alongside Daniela Thomas and Andrucha Waddington on a shoestring budget equivalent to less than £5 million.

In 2019, Meirelles directed and produced the HBO original series Joint Venture, in which marijuana has been legalized in Brazil. The series follows the story of a young drug trafficker from São Paulo who, after the legalization of marijuana in Brazil, decides to abandon his life on crime and sell his weed legally along with an inexperienced investor partner. In the same year, he directed the drama film The Two Popes for Netflix, starring Anthony Hopkins and Jonathan Pryce.

== Personal life ==
Meirelles is a Catholic.

== Filmography ==
=== Feature films ===
Year	Title	Director	Writer	Producer	Notes
1998	Menino Maluquinho 2: A Aventura	Yes	No	No	Co-directed with Fabrizia Pinto
2001	Maids	Yes	Yes	No	Co-directed with Nando Olival
2002	City of God	Yes	No	No	Co-directed with Kátia Lund
2005	The Constant Gardener	Yes	No	No	
2008	Blindness	Yes	No	No	
2011	360	Yes	No	No	
2019	The Two Popes	Yes	No	No	
2026	Beast Race	Yes	No	No	Co-directed with Rodrigo Pesavento and Ernesto Solis
2027	The Take	Yes	No	Yes	Post-production

=== Short film ===
Year	Title	Notes
1998	E no Meio Passa Um Trem	Co-directed with Nando Olival
2014	A Musa	Segment of Rio, I Love You

=== Documentary shorts ===
Year	Title	Notes
1983	Marly Normal	Co-directed with Marcelo Machado
1983	Brasília	
1986	Olhar Eletrônico	Segment director

=== Television ===
Year	Title	Director	Producer	Writer	Notes
1989	Rá-Tim-Bum	Yes	No	Yes	Directed 31 episodes
2013	A Verdade de Cada Um	No	Yes	No	
2015	Os Experientes	Yes	Yes	No	2 episodes
2015	Felizes para Sempre?	Yes	Yes	No	5 episodes
2019	Pico da Neblina	Yes	Yes	No	2 episodes
2024	Sugar	Yes	Executive	No	5 episodes
2024	The Sympathizer	Yes	No	No	Episode "Give Us Some Good Lines"

== Awards and nominations ==
Accolades for Meirelles' feature films
Year	Feature	Academy Awards		BAFTAs		Golden Globes		Grande Prêmio do Cinema Brasileiro	
Year	Feature	Nominations	Wins	Nominations	Wins	Nominations	Wins	Nominations	Wins
2001	Maids							7	
2002	City of God	4		2	1			16	6
2005	The Constant Gardener	4	1	10	1	3	1	1	1
2008	Blindness							14	4
2019	The Two Popes	3		5		4			
Total		11	1	17	2	7	1	38	11

== See also ==
- List of Brazilian Academy Award winners and nominees
