= Bruna Lombardi =

Brazilian actress, poet, writer, and model

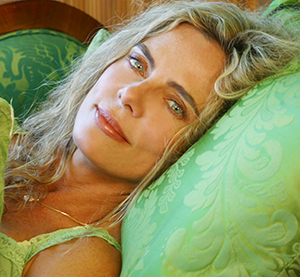
- Born: Bruna Patricia Maria Teresa Romilda Lombardi; August 1, 1952 (age 73); São Paulo, Brazil
- Occupations: Actress; writer; poet; model
- Years active: 1978–present

Bruna Patricia Maria Teresa Romilda Lombardi (born August 1, 1952) is a Brazilian poet, writer, model, and film and TV actress. She is daughter of Italian film producer Ugo Lombardi.

She is married to actor Carlos Alberto Riccelli and has a son (Kim Lombardi Riccelli). They reside in Los Angeles, California, United States. She is still thought of as one of the great Brazilian beauties.

Born in Rio de Janeiro, the daughter of Italian photographer and filmmaker Ugo Lombardi and Austrian actress Yvonne Sandner, Bruna studied at Colégio Dante Alighieri and graduated from two colleges, FAAP and ESPM.

== Filmography ==
- 2007 – The Sign of the City as Teca
- 2006 – Brasília 18% as Laura
- 2005 – Stress, Orgasmos e Salvação
- 2002 – O Príncipe as Maria Cristina
- 1983 – O Cangaceiro Trapalhão as Fada
- 1978 – A Noite dos Duros

== Television appearances ==
- The Secret Life of Couples – Sofia Prado
- O quinto dos infernos – Branca Camargo
- Andando nas nuvens – Frida
- O fim do mundo – Gardênia
- De corpo e alma – Bettina Lopes Jordão
- Roda de fogo – Lúcia Brandão
- Memórias de um gigolô – Lu
- Grande sertão: veredas – Diadorim
- Louco amor – Patrícia Dumont
- Avenida Paulista – Anamaria
- Um homem muito especial – Mariana
- Aritana – Doutora Estela
- Sem lenço, sem documento – Carla
