= Preamar =

- Also known as: High Tide
- Genre: Drama
- Created by: Estevão Ciavatta; Patrícia Andrade; William Vorhees
- Written by: Patrícia Andrade; Estevão Ciavatta; Jô Hallack; William Vorhees
- Directed by: Estevão Ciavatta
- Starring: Leonardo Franco; Roberto Bomfim; Paloma Riani; Jessika Alves; Hugo Bonemer; Thiago Amaral; Karen Junqueira; Sóstenes Vidal
- Country of origin: Brazil
- Original language: Portuguese
- No. of seasons: 1
- No. of episodes: 13

Production
- Executive producers: Mariza Figueiredo; Susana Campos
- Production location: Rio de Janeiro
- Cinematography: Flávio Zangrandi
- Editor: Sergio Mekler
- Camera setup: Arri Alexa
- Running time: 50 minutes
- Production company: Pindorama Filmes

Original release
- Network: HBO
- Release: 6 May – 29 July 2012

Preamar is a Brazilian drama television series that premiered on HBO Latin America. The series was produced by HBO's local partner, Pindorama Filmes. It first aired on May 6, 2012, being broadcast on Sundays at 9 O'clock pm (local Brazilian time: UTC -3).

The plot of the series explores the environment of the informal trade that exists on the beaches of Rio de Janeiro, which, according to series production, generates about $7 billion per year.

== Overview ==
The series follows the story of João Ricardo Velasco, a successful banker that lost everything from a Ponzi Scheme. The only thing left is his beachfront apartment in Ipanema.

Without revealing his real situation for the family, he starts working in the informal market, a territory that follows its own rules. Soon he becomes an associate of Xeriffe, who controls the cash-only business on the beach, and becomes Xeriffe's confidant and part owner of the grey market business on Ipanema.

João has been married for 25 years to Maria Isabel, with whom he has two children: Fred and Manu.

== Episodes ==
1. O Mergulho (Taking a Dive)
2. A Lei Da Praia (Beach's Law)
3. Quando a Demanda é Maior Que a Oferta (When Demand is Greater Than Supply)
4. Àguas Profundas (Deep Waters)
5. Aparência e Carisma (Appearance and Charisma)
6. Ano Novo (New Year)
7. Por Causas Mais Nobres (For Noble Causes)
8. Maré de Lua Nova (New Moon Tide)
9. Arco-íris (Rainbow)
10. A Vida Parece Uma Festa (Life is Like a Party)
11. Xilindrê (The Slammer)
12. É Carnaval (It's Carnival)
13. Águas de Março (March Waters)
