= Pico da Neblina (TV series) =

- Also known as: Joint Venture
- Genre: Crime, Drama
- Created by: Cauê Laratta; Chico Mattoso; Marcelo Starobinas; Mariana Trench Bastos
- Written by: Cauê Laratta; Chico Mattoso; Marcelo Starobinas; Mariana Trench Bastos
- Directed by: Quico Meirelles; Fernando Meirelles; Luis Carone; Rodrigo Pesavento
- Starring: Luis Navarro; Henrique Santana; Teca Pereira; Daniel Furlan; Maria Zilda Bethlem
- Country of origin: Brazil
- Original language: Portuguese
- No. of seasons: 2
- No. of episodes: 20

Production
- Executive producers: Andrea Barata Ribeiro; Bel Berlink; Fernando Meirelles; Roberto Rios; Eduardo Zaca; Luis Peraza
- Production companies: HBO Latin America Originals; O2 Filmes

Original release
- Network: HBO Brazil; HBO Latin America
- Release: August 4, 2019 - November 4, 2022

Pico da Neblina (transl. Joint Venture) is a Brazilian crime drama television series that premiered on HBO Brazil and Latin America on August 4, 2019. It depicts a scenario in which marijuana has been legalized in Brazil and following the story of a former drug dealer who needs to find a way to keep working.

The title is a pun on the meaning of 'high', as Pico da Neblina is the highest peak in Brazil.

== Premise ==
The series follows the story of Biriba (Luís Navarro), a young drug trafficker from São Paulo who, after the legalization of marijuana in Brazil, decides to abandon his life on crime and sell his weed legally along with an inexperienced investor partner. But Salim (Henrique Santana), his childhood friend, decides to follow as an old-fashioned drug dealer in the illegality.

== Cast and characters ==
- Luis Navarro as Biriba
- Henrique Santana as Salim
- Teca Pereira as Irene
- Daniel Furlan as Vini
- Maria Zilda Bethlem as Suzette Tortoriello
- Leilah Moreno as Kelly
- Dexter as CD
- William Costa as Piolho
- Bruno Giordano as Fernão Tortoriello
- Sabrina Petraglia as Nanda
- Bruce de Araújo as Digão
- Lenita Oliver as Marcela
- Nathalia Ernesto as Laura
- Fabio Marcoff as Joselo
- Renata Carvalho as Carmen
- Inara as Gabriela
- Nayobé Nzainab as Amanda
- Gabriel Salazar as Buiú
- Ivan Arcuschin as Humberto Tortoriello
- Che Moais as Pescoço
- Jorge Neto as Rick
- Henrique Brandon as Torneira
- Alex Gruli as Sargento Lopes
- Tásia D'Paula as Sônia
- Ivan de Almeida as Bigode
- Augusto Madeira as Rogério
- Fábio Neppo as Bigato

== Production ==
=== Conception and development ===
According to the director Quico Meirelles, when Pico da Neblina was being produced, in 2015, he imagined that, when the series would be premiered, in 2019, cannabis would already been legalized in Brazil. But what he saw was a twist in the opposite direction, with the discussions paralyzed in the National Congress of Brazil. The director said he could only imagine what this hypothetical Brazil would be like, based on experiences from other countries that have already legalized the drug, as part of Europe, Uruguay, Canada and the United States.

HBO Latin America announced the production of the series during the 2018 Rio2C (Rio Creative Conference) event. It was revealed that the first season of the series consisting of ten episodes would be produced by Academy Award nominated director Fernando Meirelles.

== Release ==
=== Broadcast ===
The series premiered simultaneously on HBO Brazil, HBO Latin America and the streaming service HBO Go on August 4, 2019. In Spain, the series premiered on August 5, 2019, on HBO España.
