= Animax (Latin America) =

Former cable channel

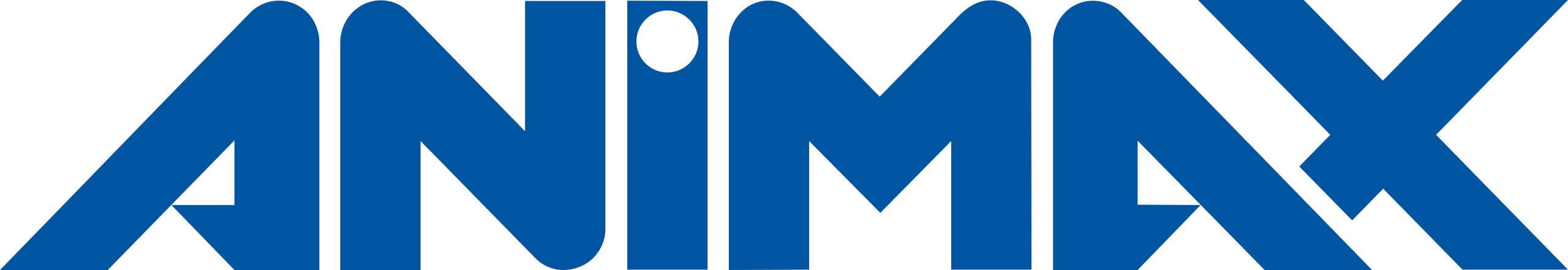
- Country: Brazil (Independent Feed); Venezuela
- Broadcast area: Latin America
- Network: Animax

Programming
- Languages: Spanish, Portuguese
- Picture format: 4:3 480i/576i SDTV

Ownership
- Owner: Sony Pictures Entertainment
- Sister channels: Sony Entertainment Television; AXN

History
- Launched: July 31, 2005; 21 years ago
- Replaced: Locomotion
- Closed: May 1, 2011; 15 years ago
- Replaced by: Sony Spin

Links
- Website: animaxtv.com

Animax was a Latin American cable television channel, serving as the regional variant of the Japanese network of the same name. It was launched on 31 July 2005, replacing Locomotion, which was acquired by Sony on 18 January of the same year. Animax was divided into four feeds: three in Spanish (each centred on Venezuela, Mexico and Argentina) and one in Portuguese (Brazil).

The channel was replaced by Sony Spin on May 1, 2011, which continued airing anime until March 5, 2012.

== History ==
Logo Animax Latin America used from 2005 to 2010

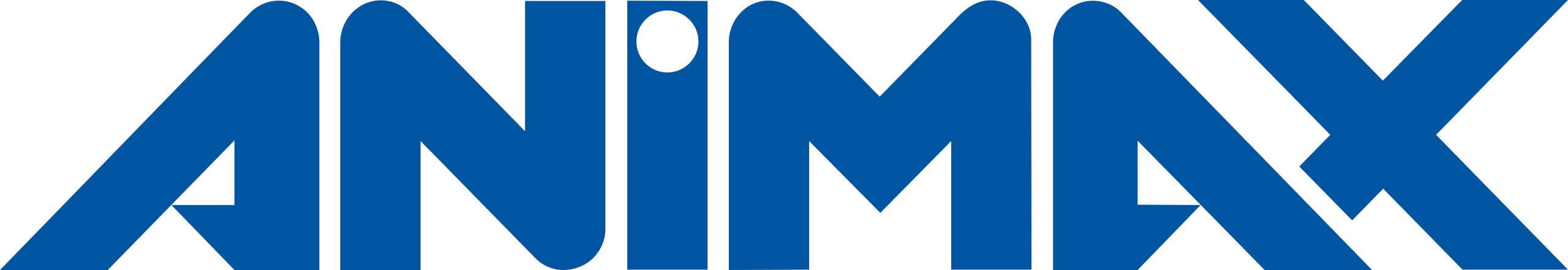
Logo Animax Latin America used from 2010 to 2011

Being Sony's first attempt to offer a 24-hour anime channel in Latin America, it planned to broadcast series in two formats. The majority of the series containing 25 episodes or more, would be aired on weekdays, whereas series with fewer than 25 episodes would be shown on certain days of the week, much like it's done in Japan. It is usual to find in one day a premiere episode of a series as well as a minimal of two encores. Also, at the end of every series, the channel airs a section called Animedia, which shows video clips of Japanese artists' songs, extra information about anime and other themes, summaries of events dedicated to anime and presentations about future series for the channel. In January 2007, it began to air a segment called Animax Nius (Nius = News), a teaser featuring news related to anime and other topics.

In 2011, anime was moved to late nights, as Western programming took over most of Animax's airtime. On May 1, 2011, the channel was renamed Sony Spin, and changed almost the entirety of its programming.

=== Background ===
In January 2000, the Animax brand began to be marketed in Latin America by Columbia TriStar International Television, as a package of animated series that channels could acquire and include in their programming as a children's block, accompanied by an entire promotional combo that included graphics based on the look and style of the channel, campaigns and promotional elements to serve as support. The Animax package consisted of series such as Max Steel, Men in Black: The Series, Starship Troopers, Godzilla, Big Guy and Rusty the Boy Robot, among others. By July, the block's rights had been acquired by Televisa, Rede Record and RCTV.

=== Attampts and proposals ===
Sony Pictures Entertainment had been studying the possibilities of broadcasting anime to Latin America, announcing in 2003 that AXN would add a one-hour anime block, something that was already happening in the AXN feeds in Europe and Asia. The titles announced were the series Initial D, Noir and the film Sin: The Movie, the latter being the only one to premiere on said channel in February of the following year.

In 2004, the group proposed Locomotion (adult animation channel specialized in anime) an association to broadcast an Animax block on the channel, where anime titles curated by Sony Pictures Entertainment would be aired, but such proposal was not achieved.

=== Launch (2005) ===
The first signs of Animax's incursion into Latin America as a channel began in 2005, with the purchase of Locomotion by Sony Pictures Entertainment on January 18, 2005, which was owned by The Hearst Corporation and Corus Entertainment (50/50 shareholding). During the time period from February to July of that year, changes occurred on the Locomotion channel during the transitional process to the new channel, such as the cancellation of premieres and certain instability in its programming. In May, the newly acquired channel moved its transmission center from Argentina to Venezuela, to HBO Latin America Group, the marketer of Sony channels in Latin America and in this process, it stopped broadcasting almost all programs that were either not anime or not related related to anime.

In late April, Sony Pictures Entertainment issues an announcement through various Internet forums, said announcement was later included on the channel's official page. The network was scheduled to start on July 31.

The introduction of the Animax channel was done in advance before the launch as an official channel. In the weeks leading up to July, on sister channels AXN and Sony Entertainment Television, an advertising campaign began in the style of a media show, called F.A.A (Frente Aliado del Anime, Allied Anime Front), This campaign was used as a reference before, during and after the replacement and "death" of Locomotion, under the slogan "Un nuevo orden televisivo" (A new television order).

On July 31, 2005, Locomotion's broadcasts officially ended (at 4am, Mexico time, 5am Venezuela time, 6am Argentina/Brazil time). After that moment, a countdown clock marking the start of Animax appeared on screen. The launch took place seven hours later (at 11am Mexico time, 12pm Venezuela time, 1pm Argentina/Brazil time), officially. That same day, as a way to promote the channel, the first episode of Hellsing and Wolf's Rain were simulcast on Sony Entertainment Television and AXN. This event was repeated on October 16 of the same year, with the premieres of the first episode of Gantz and Full Metal Panic? Fumoffu.

The way in which Sony tried to provide an exclusive 24-hour anime channel in Latin America was thought to put series in two formats: series that contained more than 26 episodes would be broadcast every day, while those with a smaller amount would be broadcast on certain days of the week. The series were broadcast dubbed into Spanish and Portuguese (in Brazil). These were acquired from local distributors (Xystus, Ledafilms, Televix, Cloverway and Sony Pictures), which already had dubbing; also, from foreign distributors (Viz Media and ADV Films), which had dubbing produced by the channel, along with those that had been acquired by Locomotion and the series that Sony owned to be broadcast on Animax networks around the world.

Animax had three feeds:

- Feed 1: Venezuela
- Feed 2: Brazil
- Feed 3: Generic Feed available for the rest of Latin America

At the end of each series, a section called Animedia was presented, which featured video clips from Japanese artists, which would later include American and Latin American artists, curious facts about nerdcore, summaries of related events, interviews with anime creators and studios, and presentations about future series available on the channel.

=== Development (2006–2008) ===
At the beginning of 2006, the series that had been inherited from Locomotion went off the air. Since the beginning of 2007, it had a segment called Animax Nius (Nius = News), which emulated a newscast presenting news on different topics. On August 15, Animax launched a new website, with a new design and more content. This was on the occasion of the completion of two years of existence in Latin America. At this same time, the channel began to rethink the redirection of its target audience.

Regarding the supposed premiere of the hentai anime Immoral Sister, its transmission was corroborated by the Animax executives themselves through Editorial Ivrea's Lazer Magazine (which had already spread this "news" in previous issues); however, the Immoral Sisters OVAs were never actually acquired and Animax had no intentions of airing hentai. Something similar happened with the anime Kiddy Grade, this anime was never acquired by Animax and was confused with SoltyRei.

=== Animax 2.0 (2008–2009) ===
Starting on May 5, Animax completely changed the channel's image for the first time in Latin America, promoting itself as Animax 2.0, aiming to add content related to its target: the teenage audience. The channel announced an original program, Animax Live, which would also use interaction using chats and blogs.

A controversy arose about the broadcasts of Distraction (a game show of British origin) and live-action films licensed by Sony Pictures Entertainment in the Reciclo block, since they had nothing to do with anime. These changes were due to the beginning of a strategic plan by Sony Pictures to attract new youth sectors and generate more audiences.

On October 1, the official Animax blog confirmed the broadcast of Lost, a series broadcast by AXN, which finally took place on October 5, gbecoming the first live-action series to premiere on the channel.

At the beginning of 2009, J-pop and J-rock music was temporarily broadcast in the Animedia segment, which had been occupied by Western music from the Sony Music label. On June 3, the premiere of a North American animated series for adults, Spaceballs, premiered, based on parodies of science fiction films (mainly Star Wars), also broadcast on Sony Entertainment Television.

Due to the income crisis due to the channel's low audience, a block of infomercials was included in the programming, which was broadcast from Monday to Sunday from 9:00 to 11:00 for Mexico; At the beginning of 2010, these ads would be withdrawn.

In October 2009, more Western content was introduced, changing it from being a channel specialized in Japanese animation to a variety channel; Among the premiered programs are a range of musical programs also broadcast on Sony Entertainment Television, adult animation series produced by Sony and reality shows acquired from MTV; it also began broadcasting movies with Spanish subtitles in its Reciclo block, which it gives more space, thus reducing anime programming.

=== Relaunch and closure (2010–2011) ===
In March 2010, Sony Pictures Television announced the relaunch of Animax globally, which had been revamped to focus on a broader youth target and had expanded its programmatic vision to encompass television, Internet, mobile and emerging platforms. The launch of the new Animax aimed to capture the global youth audience aged 14-29. The changes arrived first to the Portuguese feed in April and reached Latin America in May.

The channel confirms the premiere of more Western content, thus opening up to teen comedies.

In April, it was announced that an HD version would launch in 2011. In May, it introduced a new brand identity changing its logo and graphics, in line with the changes of the subsidiaries in Europe and Asia, and with more varied content, such as fiction, reality shows, magazines, comedy, and animation, since this would continue to be part of the channel, although to a lesser extent.

On September 15, 2010, the vice president of Sony Pictures Television Latin America, Klaudia Bermúdez Key, announced to the Brazilian entertainment website Tela Viva that Animax would stop broadcasting anime completely as of March 2011, transforming itself into a music channel, live action programs and reality shows; totally deviating from its target audience.

At the start of October 2010, the channel removed Hunter × Hunter, Crayon Shin-Chan, Fate/stay night, Samurai 7, Bokurano, Neon Genesis Evangelion, Hellsing, Mushishi, R.O.D the TV and 009-1, being the last remaining anime series: Fullmetal Alchemist, Death Note, Blood+, Black Jack, Samurai X, Planet Survival, The Twelve Kingdoms, Get Backers and Prince of Tennis, which aired Monday to Sunday overnight, from 02:00 AM to 06:00 AM. From March 14, 2011, Nodame Cantabile was added. This overnight strand would remain on the new channel Sony Spin until March 2012, where Fullmetal Alchemist: Brotherhood and a new batch of episodes of Bleach were released.

The channel since the beginning of 2011 began to have a greater decrease in anime-type programs, something that had already been announced since September 2010. As of March 28, 2011, it was confirmed that Animax would end its broadcasts due to decisions by Sony Pictures Entertainment, to make way for the new Sony Spin channel, starting on May 1.

According to T.C. Schultz, executive VP of International Channels for Latin America and Brazil at Sony Pictures Television, the decision to shut down Animax in the region and replace it with Sony Spin was due to the fact that the niche of anime fans in Latin America was very small.

== Original ==
=== Anime TV series ===
- .hack//Legend of the Twilight
- .hack//Sign
- 009-1
- Babel II: Beyond Infinity
- Baby Baa Chan
- Barom One
- Basilisk
- Beast Fighter
- Black Cat
- Black Jack
- Blood+
- Bokurano
- Burst Angel
- Ran, The Samurai Girl
- Cosmo Warrior Zero
- Crayon Shin-chan
- DNA²
- Dear Boys
- Death Note
- Demon Lord Dante
- Di Gi Charat Nyo!
- Earth Maiden Arjuna
- Excel Saga
- Fate/stay night
- Full Metal Panic? Fumoffu
- Galaxy Angel
- Gankutsuou: The Count of Monte Cristo
- Gantz
- Genma Taisen
- GetBackers
- Gun Frontier
- Heat Guy J
- Hell Girl
- Hellsing
- Humanoid Monster Bem
- Hungry Heart: Wild Striker
- Hunter × Hunter
- I'm Gonna Be An Angel!
- Initial D
- Last Exile
- Legend of Blue
- Mars, The Terminator
- Martian Successor Nadesico
- Mushishi
- Musumet
- Neon Genesis Evangelion
- Noir
- Panda-Z: The Robonimation
- Pita-Ten
- R.O.D the TV
- Rurouni Kenshin
- s-CRY-ed
- Saber Marionette J to X
- Saber Marionette J
- Saikano
- Samurai 7
- Serial Experiments Lain
- SoltyRei
- Speed Grapher
- Steel Angel Kurumi
- Stratos 4
- Submarine Super 99
- The Mythical Detective Loki Ragnarok
- The Prince of Tennis
- The Super Milk Chan Show
- The Twelve Kingdoms
- Trinity Blood
- Tsukihime
- Twin Spica
- Uninhabited Planet Survive!
- Vandread
- Wild 7: Another
- Wolf's Rain
- xxxHOLIC

=== TV series ===
- 10 Things I Hate About You
- 18 to Life
- 90210 (moved from SET to Sony Spin in May 2011)
- American Dreams
- Atomix TV
- The Best Years
- Beverly Hills 90210
- Blood Ties
- The Boondocks
- Clueless
- Distraction
- Gamers TV
- FusionA2 (replaced by Estúdio Coca-Cola on MTV in Brazil)
- In the Qube
- Is She Really Going Out With Him?
- Jake & Blake
- Kaya
- Lil' Bush
- Living Lahaina
- Lost
- Make It or Break It
- Maui Fever
- The Middleman
- Rock Road
- Ruby and the Rockits
- SesioneS con Alejandro Franco
- Spaceballs: The Animated Series
- That '70s Show

== Translation and dubbing teams ==
Several dubbing studios have participated in the translation of the aforementioned series for their premiere on Animax, and are located in key countries like Mexico, Brazil, Argentina, Colombia and Venezuela. After Animax's arrival in 2005, numerous series were translated and dubbed into Spanish and Portuguese languages, including Blood+, The Twelve Kingdoms, Steel Angel Kurumi, Noir, Wolf's Rain, Martian Successor Nadesico, Galaxy Angel and others.
