= Musumet =

Japanese anime television series

流星戦隊ムスメット (Ryūsei Sentai Musumet)
- Genre: Action, Comedy, Superhero
- Created by: Wonder Farm
- Anime television series
- Directed by: Shigeru Kimiya
- Written by: Koichi Taki
- Music by: Ryo Sakai
- Studio: TNK
- Original network: CTC, Teletama, tvk, Animax
- Original run: October 4, 2004 – December 27, 2004
- Episodes: 13

Musumet (Japanese: 流星戦隊ムスメット, Hepburn: Ryūsei Sentai Musumet; lit. "Shooting Starlets Musumet") is a Japanese anime television series directed by Shigeru Kimiya and animated by TNK. It aired in Japan from October 4, 2004, to December 27, 2004, for a total of 13 episodes.

== Media ==
=== Manga ===
Episode 1 Voyeur Molester. Musumet Underwear.

Episode 2 Tentacle Escape! Slimy musumet ten-tickle

Episode 3 electric current! Musumet faints

Episode 4 Tickling torture? Musumet in the Electric Chair!
