= Os Experientes =

- Created by: Quico Meirelles
- Directed by: Fernando Meirelles; Quico Meirelles
- Country of origin: Brazil
- Original language: Portuguese
- No. of episodes: 4

Production
- Running time: 45 minutes

Original release
- Network: Rede Globo
- Release: 10 April – 1 May 2015

Os Experientes is a Brazilian television series created by Quico Meirelles, with screenplay by Antonio Prata and Márcio Alemão and directed by Fernando Meirelles. Was co-produced by O2 Filmes and aired by Rede Globo from April 10 to May 1, 2015, in 4 episodes.

== Plot ==
Made up of four independent stories interconnected by the characters, the show reminisces about growing old, but also about rediscovering and reinventing ourselves to enjoy the best years of our lives.

== Cast ==
- Beatriz Segall... Yolanda
- João Côrtes ... Kléber Amaral dos Santos
- João Baldasserini ... Altair Pereira da Silva
- André Abujamra ... Nogueira
- Augusto Madeira ... Tenente Souza
- Bruno Giordano ... Wilson Lopes
- Anamaria Barreto ... Mary
- Fábio Nepo ... Cabo Moacir
- Wilson das Neves ... Mateus
- Germano Mathias ... Lucas Pereira
- Goulart de Andrade ... Oswaldo
- Bibba Chuqui ... Celeste
- Cris Carniato ... Cristiane
- Juca de Oliveira ... Napoleão Roberto Junqueira da Costa
- Dan Stulbach ... Luiz Vilela da Costa
- Lima Duarte ... Doutor Pricolli
- Othon Bastos ... Del Bello
- Karin Rodrigues ... Nininha
- Clarisse Abujamra ... Vera Lúcia
- Teca Pereira ... Cleuza Silveira Santos (Negra)
- Bruno Belarmino ... Ronaldo Damasceno
- Selma Egrei ... Francisca Toledini
- Joana Fomm ... Maria Helena
- Eucir de Souza ... Daniel Toledini
- Sílvia Lourenço ... Neide Toledini

== Awards ==
Year	Award	Category	Result
2016	44th International Emmy Awards	Best TV movie or Miniseries	Nominated
