= Sony Spin =

Latin American pay television channel

- Country: Brazil (independent feed); United States
- Broadcast area: Latin America
- Headquarters: Latin America

Programming
- Languages: Spanish; Portuguese
- Picture format: 4:3 480i (SDTV)

Ownership
- Owner: Sony Pictures Television
- Sister channels: Sony Entertainment Television; AXN; AXN Spin (Polish version)

History
- Launched: May 1, 2011; 15 years ago
- Replaced: Animax
- Closed: June 30, 2014; 11 years ago

Links
- Website: www.sonyspin.com

Sony Spin was a Latin American cable television channel, launched on May 1, 2011, replacing the local version of Animax. It was shut down on July 1, 2014, due to low ratings and reception.

== History ==
Formerly known as Animax, it was Sony's first attempt to offer a 24-hour anime channel in Latin America, replacing Locomotion. On 1 July 2014, Sony Spin was removed from pay-TV providers and replaced with a localised variant of A&E's Lifetime, a television network targeted at female audiences.

== Translation and dubbing teams ==
Several dubbing studios have participated in the translation of the aforementioned series for their premiere on Animax, and are located in key countries like Mexico, Brazil, Argentina and Venezuela. After Animax's arrival in 2005.

== See also ==
- AXN Spin
