= Telemundo Internacional =

Latin American pay TV network

- Country: United States; Latin America
- Broadcast area: Worldwide
- Network: Telemundo (2006–present)
- Headquarters: San Juan, Puerto Rico

Programming
- Language: Spanish
- Picture format: 1080i HDTV (downscaled to letterboxed 480i/576i for the SDTV feed)

Ownership
- Owner: NBCUniversal International Networks (Comcast/NBCUniversal) (operated and distributed by Ole Distribution)
- Sister channels: E! Universal TV; USA Network; Studio Universal; DreamWorks Channel

History
- Launched: December 1, 1994; 31 years ago
- Former names: Telenoticias (1994–1996); CBS Telenoticias (1996–2000)

Links
- Website: www.telemundo.com/internacional (in Spanish)

Telemundo Internacional is a Latin American pay television network owned by NBCUniversal. Telemundo Internacional carries a variety of programs, consisting mainly of select programs from the Telemundo national schedule.

== History ==
=== Origins as Telenoticias ===
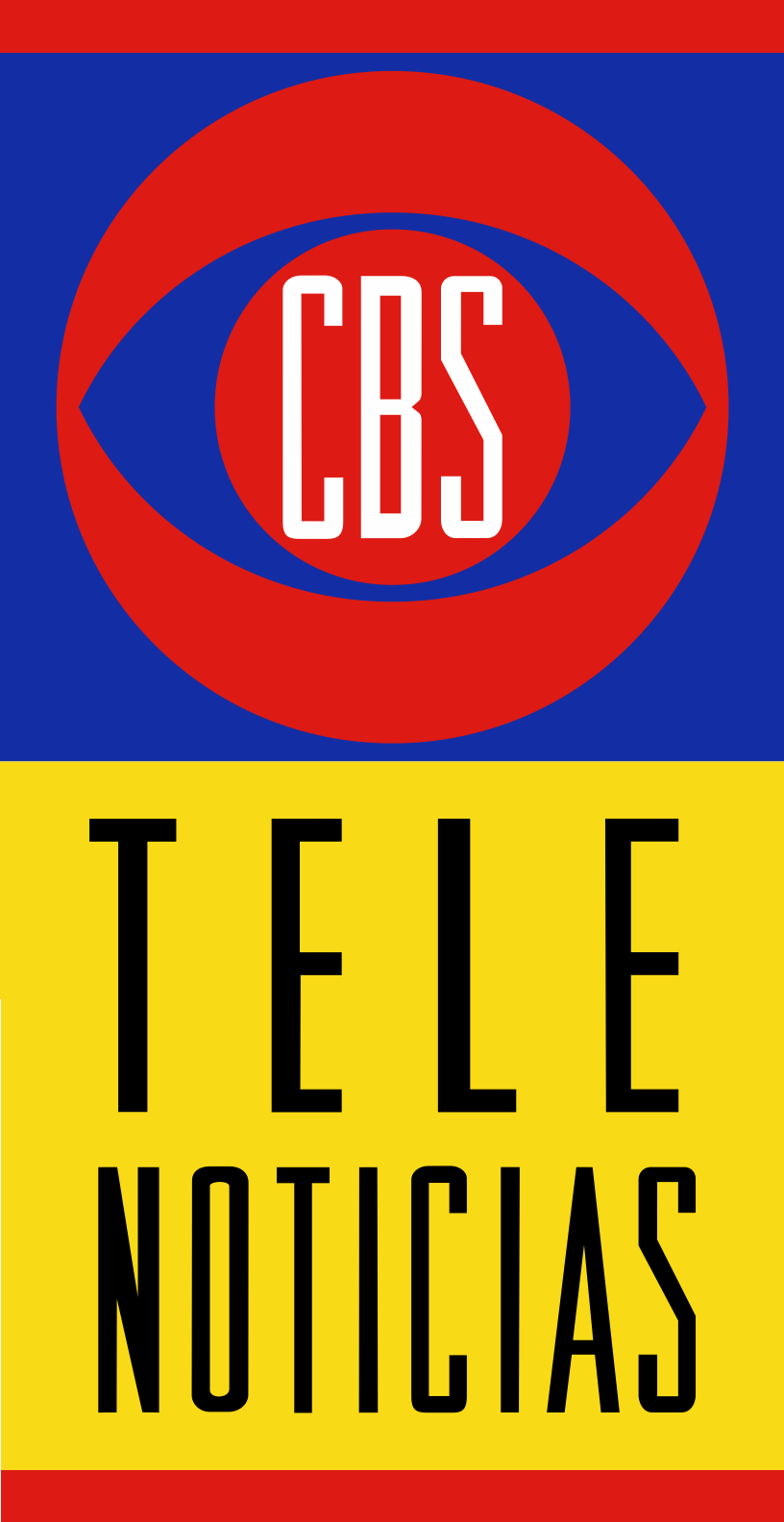
CBS TeleNoticias logo used from 1997 to 2000.

Telemundo Puerto Rico traces its history to June 1, 1993, when Telemundo Group (then owned by investment firm Reliance Capital) announced that it would launch a 24-hour Spanish-language cable news channel that would be distributed in Latin America, Spain and the United States. This service, christened Telenoticias, launched on December 1, 1994, becoming the second 24-hour news channel to serve Latin America that was headquartered in the region. Telenoticias – which broadcast its programming in Spanish and Portuguese – was operated out of Telemundo's headquarters in the Miami suburb of Hialeah, Florida. In addition to distribution on cable and satellite television, some Telenoticias programming was also carried by television stations in certain U.S. markets.

From the beginning, all five of the network's owners did not maintain a smooth relationship, disagreeing on Telenoticias' management and content; ultimately, the partners opted to sell off the network. In late June 1996, the companies sold Telenoticias to CBS, marking the company's first cable television venture since it ran the short-lived arts-oriented network CBS Cable (which it eventually named its new cable division) in the early 1980s. Following the closure of the CBS purchase, the network was rebranded CBS Telenoticias on January 1, 1997. As part of the sale agreement, Telemundo entered into an agreement to outsource production responsibilities for the Telemundo network's national news program, Noticiero Telemundo. The network also began utilizing resources from CBS Newspath to provide story content to supplement the newscasts.

The network expanded its distribution into the United States in the fall of 1997, at the same time as it expanded to Brazil. The network gained a major coup early on, when it reached an agreement with Sistema Brasileiro de Televisão to produce Jornal do SBT and share its content resources, but it faced difficulties getting cable carriage and with the satellite intended to carry its feed.

During the first quarter of 1998 alone, Telenoticias and fellow CBS Cable-owned channel Eye on People lost a combined $9 million in revenue. In late 1998, CBS sold a 70% interest in the channel to Mexican-based Grupo Medcom, a concern operated by the Serna family; under the deal, CBS continued to provide news content resources through CBS Newspath. Financial problems ultimately trickled into Telenoticias' operations, and by early August 1999, the network filed for Chapter 11 bankruptcy.

CBS sold its stake in Telenoticias to Sony Pictures Entertainment and Liberty Media in February 2000 for $2.35 million; the deal was approved in federal bankruptcy court, placing Telenoticias back under the auspices of Telemundo, which Sony and Liberty acquired months after Telenoticias' sale to CBS.

=== Reformatting as Telemundo Internacional ===
In September 2000, the network changed its name to Telemundo Internacional, abandoning its original focus as a news channel to convert into a bilingual general entertainment network. At that time, the rebranded network began airing programs from the Telemundo broadcast network and later, its sister cable channel mun2; it also carried some shows produced by the Telemundo Internacional production division, such as the talk shows Hoy en América ("Today in America") and América en vivo ("America Live") as well as four daily newscasts – some of which were rebroadcast on Telemundo, including a Mexico City-based late-night program Noticiero Telemundo Internacional (which ran on the Telemundo network until its cancellation in 2011, and aired as a substitute for local newscasts on some of the network's broadcast affiliates). Senior anchor Marian de la Fuente was the last anchor to also serve as the managing editor for its news operation.

In 2005, Telemundo reduced news programming on the cable network and dropped the mun2 shows; it then began to air some older telenovelas produced by Colombian production company RTI, which maintained a content partnership with Telemundo that included co-production agreements for some telenovelas seen on the broadcast network. The news output closed in July 2006, coinciding with the closure of the original Telemundo Internacional, which was no longer considered viable. The network instead used its resources to with US and Puerto Rican networks instead.

=== Revival ===
In 2009, the channel was revived, being represented in Latin America by Televisa Networks. The channel by 2013 was among the ten most-watched cable networks available in Mexico. In Venezuela, it was among the top five. Talks with operators in Chile and Argentina were underway. In the first five years since its revival, the channel's advertising revenue in Mexico increased over 30% each year. From June 2014, HBO Latin America Group (currently Olé Distribution) became in charge of the channel's handling.

== Programming ==
Telemundo Internacional programming slate relies primarily on a variety of programming from the main Telemundo network schedule, consisting mainly of telenovelas, sports, talk and variety series and feature films.

Telemundo Internacional does not carry any traditional advertising; breaks within programs consist largely of public service announcements (which comprise 90% of breaks), along with promotions for Telemundo Internacional programs (which make up 5% of the breaks).
