= Orby TV =

American direct broadcast satellite and streaming TV company

Orby TV, LLC.
- Industry: Satellite television
- Founded: 2019; 7 years ago (as Orby TV)
- Defunct: March 1, 2021; 4 years ago
- Headquarters: Burbank, California, United States
- Area served: Contiguous United States
- Products: Prepaid satellite pay television, streaming television

Orby TV was an American direct broadcast satellite provider based in Burbank, California. Founded in 2019, Orby transmitted digital satellite television and audio to households within the United States and territories on Pan-American satellite Eutelsat 117 West A. The company's primary competitors were Dish Network, DirecTV and cable television providers. Orby TV's CEO was Michael Thornton, former chief executive officer for Starz and former Programming Director at DirecTV. On March 1, 2021, the company shut down and service ended abruptly when the company ran out of operating capital. Its website was updated with a short text page recommending customers switch to DISH Network through a limited-time partnership discount.

== History ==
The company was started in early 2019 by Michael Thornton, a former Starz executive who envisioned a low-cost satellite TV service built around the business model of prepaid mobile phones.

In September 2019, the company began offering its hardware for sale coupled with a free over-the-air antenna and pay TV packages starting at $40 a month. Channels available at launch included general entertainment and lifestyle networks from ViacomCBS, A+E Networks, AMC Networks, WarnerMedia and Discovery Networks, among others. Premium movie networks HBO, Starz, Epix and Cinemax were also available for additional fees.

To receive service, prospective Orby TV customers first had to pay $100 for an Orby TV-branded satellite TV receiver and separately pay for professional installation of a satellite dish coupled with an over-the-air antenna. The antenna was offered, so Orby TV customers could receive free broadcast networks without Orby TV needing to negotiate carriage of those networks separately; Orby TV promised customers the over-the-air antenna would continue to work, even if customers stopped paying for a pay TV package.

To keep operating and subscription costs low, Orby TV entered a lease agreement with Eutelsat, which allowed it to rent transponder space without having to launch and maintain its own fleet of satellites.

By mid-2020, Thornton said Orby TV was reaching its break-even point, which was later revealed to be around 100,000 subscribers. The company said it would launch support for TV Everywhere, which would allow customers to watch cable networks in their package on associated streaming apps.

In mid-February 2021, a notice on Orby TV's website said the company had stopped activating new customer accounts. A short time later, journalists noticed Orby TV receivers sold at Best Buy were deeply discounted and marked for clearance. A few days later, the website began accepting new customers once again.

On March 1, 2021, Orby TV announced via its website that the company was shutting down. Customers with Orby TV dishes and receivers were asked to contact Dish Network for a special promotional offer.

It was later revealed Orby TV had run out of cash, and attempts to raise additional funds during the ongoing COVID-19 pandemic were unsuccessful. On March 15, 2021, Orby TV filed for Chapter 11 bankruptcy protection.

Florida-based satellite broadcaster Disitron Satellite Group acquired the rights to the Orby TV intellectual property and its remaining satellite equipment during bankruptcy proceedings in July 2021. The Orby TV website was eventually reactivated to reflect the new ownership of Disitron subsidiary Upcom Technologies, as well as Upcom's intention to relaunch the service with an initial package of faith-based and family-friendly programming. As of August 2022, a relaunch date and package availability had yet to be announced.

== Channels ==
Orby TV offered two packages: Essentials and Extras. Essentials includes 46 specialty channels, 20 of which were in high definition. The Extras package added 24 standard-definition specialty channels to the Essentials package, for a total of 70 channels. Orby TV derived the majority of its programming from the cable divisions of A&E Networks, Hallmark Entertainment, WarnerMedia, AMC Networks, ViacomCBS and Discovery, Inc.

The Orby TV satellite dish included a television antenna to receive local broadcast television stations (such as ABC, CBS, Fox and NBC), which allowed Orby TV to limit the amount of retransmission fees it paid to content distributors. The local channels were unavailable via Orby TV satellite service, and availability varied with the included antenna's reception and location.
