= Sony Movies (Latin American TV channel) =

- Country: Brazil
- Broadcast area: Nationwide

Programming
- Language: Portuguese
- Picture format: HDTV 1080i

Ownership
- Owner: Sony Pictures Entertainment (distributed by Ole Distribution)
- Sister channels: Sony Channel; AXN

History
- Launched: 15 July 2022; 3 years ago

Links
- Website: br.sonymovies.com

Availability

Terrestrial
- Nossa TV: Channel 42
- Brisanet: Channel 46 (HD)
- SKY: Channel 135; Channel 535 (HD)
- Vivo TV: Channel 661 (HD)

Streaming media
- UOL Play: Simulcast
- SKY+: Simulcast
- Vivo Play: Simulcast

Sony Movies is a Latin American pay television channel that broadcasts movies, is owned by Sony Pictures Entertainment and distributed by Ole Distribution, broadcasts from Mexico City and Bogotá in Spanish and from São Paulo in Portuguese.

It was launched on July 1, 2022 on Directv and DGO in Latin America and also on pay television providers, and in Brazil under Sky Brasil, UOL, DGO and Claro/NET.
