= Medical News Network =

American interactive television services

- Country: United States

Programming
- Language: English

Ownership
- Owner: Whittle Communications

History
- Launched: 1993
- Closed: 1994

The Medical News Network (MNN) was an American interactive video news service delivered to physicians by satellite. It was launched in 1993 by Whittle Communications, and shut down in 1994.

== History ==
The service had a business model similar to Whittle Communications's Channel One, as well as Whittle's Special Report TV and magazine project, which was available in about 30,000 medical waiting rooms."

According to Medical Market and Media, MNN would use satellite transmission to send daily medical news and information programming to VCR/TV units operated by the network and located in medical offices. Programming could be viewed on demand, and included a daily 10-minute news program. The system was interactive, using what Medical Market and Media described as "computer and modem units."

The service had been tested in 5,000 doctors' offices, and Whittle had planned to do a national rollout in fall 1994. But according to the Los Angeles Times, the company was unable to attract sufficient sponsorship from drug companies, and shut down the service in August 1994, laying off 205 employees.
