= USA Network (Latin America) =

- Country: United States
- Broadcast area: Latin America and the Caribbean

Programming
- Languages: Spanish; Portuguese (only in Brazil)
- Picture format: 480i SDTV/1080i HDTV

Ownership
- Owner: NBCUniversal International Networks (majority), Ole Communications (minority) (distributed by Ole Distribution) (Note: Branding licensed from Versant.); Brazil: NBCUniversal International Networks (50%), Globo (50%) (distributed by Globo) (Note: Branding licensed from Versant.)
- Sister channels: DreamWorks Channel; E! Studio Universal; Universal TV

History
- Launched: October 1, 2023; 2 years ago
- Former names: Sci-Fi (2007–2010); Syfy (2010–2023)

The second and current incarnation of the USA Network in Latin America is a channel dedicated to series and movie programming. It is owned by NBCUniversal International Networks. The local version of the channel is available in Spanish and Portuguese-language feeds (for Spanish-speaking countries and for Brazil, respectively).

In 2023, it was announced by NBCUniversal that the channel would be revived in Latin America during the Q4 of 2023 after 19 years of absence in the region since the first incarnation rebranded as Universal Channel (now Universal TV) in 2004. The channel currently broadcasts dramas like Briarpatch and Dr. Death, also the channel would be the official broadcaster of the Miss Universe pageant which was broadcast on November 18. USA Network was relaunched on October 1, 2023, replacing Syfy in the region.

== Programming ==
=== Current ===
- Blue Bloods
- Bull
- Dr. Death
- Emerald City
- Family Law
- Magnum P.I.
- Nightsleeper
- Paris Has Fallen
- Prodigal Son
- The Rookie
- Suits
- Suits LA

=== Former ===
- 12 Monkeys
- Briarpatch
- Day of The Dead
- Face off
- Frogger
- Coroner
- Gone
- The Lazarus Project
- Grimm
- Heroes
- The Magicians
- SYFY Games
- Vagrant Queen
