= Studio Universal (Latin America) =

American cable TV channel

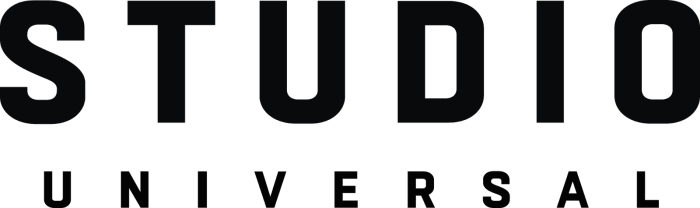
- Country: United States
- Broadcast area: Latin America and the Caribbean

Programming
- Languages: Spanish; Portuguese
- Picture format: 1080i HDTV (downscaled to 480i/576i for the SDTV feed)

Ownership
- Owner: NBCUniversal International Networks (NBCUniversal/Comcast) (operated and distributed by Ole Distribution); Brazil: NBCUniversal International Networks (50%), Canais Globo (Globo, 50%) (distributed by Canais Globo)
- Sister channels: Universal TV; USA Network; E! DreamWorks Channel

History
- Launched: September, 1997 (as Hallmark Channel); February 1, 2010 (as Studio Universal)
- Former names: Hallmark Entertainment Network (1997-2001); Hallmark Channel (2001-2010)

Links
- Website: Latin America; Brazil

Studio Universal Latin America is a 24-hour cable television channel broadcasting from New York, United States, targeted for Middle and South American audiences.

It is owned by Universal Networks International, a division of NBCUniversal, and was launched in Latin America in September, 1997. It mostly airs American movies and films and some series and is a sister channel to Universal TV in the region. It broadcasts in four feeds, Brasil, Mexico, Argentina and Latam. From its launch until January 31, 2010, the channel was named Hallmark Channel. It was renamed Studio Universal on February 1, 2010.

The Brazilian feed of the channel, as well as its sister network, USA Network, are operated since Early-October 2023, by the joint venture between Universal Networks International and Organizações Globo-owned Globosat which already operated the Brazilian version of Universal TV.

== Feeds ==
- Mexican feed. Aired in Mexico.
- Argentine feed. Aired in Argentina, Paraguay and Uruguay.
- Chilean feed. Aired in Chile.
- Brazilian feed. Aired in Brazil, operated by a joint venture between NBCU and Globosat and distributed by the latter.
- Latam feed. Aired in the rest of Latin America.
- Colombian feed. Aired in Colombia.

Hallmark Channel logo used from 1997 to 2010 in Latin America, including Brazil

Studio Universal logo used from 2010 to 2016 in Latin America, including Brazil

== Programming ==
=== Current ===
- Fullscreen

=== Previous ===
- Fairly Legal
- Nurse Jackie
- Psych (seasons 5–8)
- Ringer
- Smash (only season 2)
- The Good Wife (seasons 4–5, seasons 1-3 and 6 air on Universal Channel)
- Monk (repeats)

== See also ==
- Hallmark Channel (International)
- Hallmark Channel
