= Locomotion (TV channel) =

Latin American anime cable television channel

- Broadcast area: Ibero-America
- Headquarters: Miami Beach, Florida, U.S.

Programming
- Languages: Spanish; Portuguese
- Picture format: 480i/576i - 4:3 (SDTV)

Ownership
- Owner: The Hearst Corporation (1996–2005); Claxson Interactive Group (1996–2002); Corus Entertainment (2002–2005); Sony Pictures Television (2005)

History
- Launched: November 4, 1996; 30 years ago (Latin America); September 15, 1997; 29 years ago (Spain and Portugal)
- Closed: July 1, 2003; 23 years ago (Spain and Portugal); July 31, 2005; 21 years ago (Latin America)
- Replaced by: Animax

Links
- Website: www.locomotion.com

Locomotion was a Latin American cable channel dedicated to anime and animated shows targeting primarily an 18–35 audience, broadcasting movies, TV series and shorts. It was launched on November 4, 1996, and was closed down on July 31, 2005. It was also broadcast in Spain and Portugal through a dedicated Iberian feed launched on September 15, 1997. The feed was distributed through Cabovisão in Portugal and satellite television provider Vía Digital in Spain until July 1, 2003, when the service was discontinued.

== History ==
Initially, Locomotion was a channel dedicated to animation for all ages, broadcasting titles from King Features (which was Hearst's animation division), other acquired shows, and adult animation for an evening block. Over time, amid growing competition from other animation-focused channels and the limited availability of networks aimed at adult audiences, the channel's executives decided to adopt a more aggressive programming strategy, shifting its focus exclusively toward adult-oriented programming.

The channel was relaunched on November 1, 1999, with a new visual identity conceived by Walter Zamora and the Locomotion creative team, characterized by an unconventional approach for television.

From then on, in addition to continuing to acquire exclusive regional premieres—particularly in the field of Japanese animation—the channel's programming brought together content that had previously been scattered across different networks. This included titles that had gradually disappeared from television, such as productions with limited distribution, shows previously broadcast on children's networks, and series whose production had been discontinued.

According to the channel's management, Locomotion sought to offer content outside the mass market, including lesser-known or difficult-to-broadcast productions, such as OVAs (anime productions intended for release and consumption on video) in the form of miniseries of varying lengths and episode counts.

As the network grew, most of its programming consisted of Japanese animation titles from companies such as Bandai Visual, ADV Films, Sunrise, Kodansha, and others. It also aired adult-oriented shows such as South Park, The Critic, Crapston Villas, Duckman, Dr. Katz, Professional Therapist, Stressed Eric and Robin. Locomotion was also dedicated to showing works of experimental animation from all over the world throughout the day on-air and online. They aired experimental programming featuring video jockeys (VJs), artists who worked with video as a medium.

The network was a joint venture between U.S.-based The Hearst Corporation (50%) and Claxson Interactive Group, Inc. (50%), a subsidiary of the Venezuelan-based Cisneros Group. Although its corporate offices were based in Miami Beach, Florida, the network was not available in the United States, except through a few cable systems in southern Florida. In May 2002, Cisneros Group sold its shares in the network to Canadian-based Corus Entertainment.

Following its relaunch in the late 1990s, Locomotion experienced growth in subscriptions, coinciding with its increasing focus on anime and reaffirming its priority of acquiring content from Japan. As a result, in 2004, the channel began presenting itself as the region's anime channel under the “AnimeStation” tagline.

In 2005, taking advantage of Locomotion's subscriber base and distribution network, Sony Pictures Entertainment acquired the channel from The Hearst Corporation and Corus Entertainment on January 18, 2005. The acquisition was completed on July 31, 2005, and the channel was subsequently rebranded as Animax.

== Loco ==
First Locomotion logo used from November 4, 1996, to November 1, 1999.

The original logo was an isologo designed by Kirk Richard Smith at his studio, Firehouse 101 Art + Design. It consisted of a head-shaped figure known as Loco, whose red face incorporated the letters of the word “loco” into the ear, nose, and eyes, while the word “motion” appeared in the mouth. It featured a six-pointed forelock, with the right ear positioned slightly higher than the left. Loco could take on various forms, embodying different characters. Following the brand redesign in 1999, the channel adopted a logotype featuring the silhouette of Loco's face in white.

Loco was also one of Locomotion's mascots, a computer-generated character produced by Modern Cartoons. The character, created by Omar Quiroga, which mostly appeared during commercial breaks, made humorous comments and engaged in nonsensical antics to entertain viewers. The mascot was retired when the channel underwent a rebranding.

A final, yet brief reference of Loco when Animax replaced Locomotion, which is the part where the special agents sent to save Locomotion, they received a call from Loco before he gets killed.

== TV blocks ==
The programming of this channel was divided in thematic blocks which are:

- 80's TV (1999–2001): A programming block aimed at nostalgic adult audiences, featuring series that had been hits during the 1980s. It aired daily in the mornings, as well as on weekend afternoons.
- Animafilms (1999–2005): An animated film series featuring movies from around the world.
- Anime Loving (2001–2002): A programming block aimed at anime fans, featuring two series consisting of 12 or 13 episodes, with one episode of each series airing weekly.
- Cortos Locomotion (1997–2005): Known as Locoblip during its early years, it featured animated shorts broadcast during programming breaks.
- Domingos Locomotion (2003): A programming block that incorporated Replay alongside the premieres of new episodes of Bob and Margaret and South Park.
- Early Movies (1999–2001): An animated film series consisting of feature-length films associated with the Retromotion and 80's TV blocks. It aired on weekend afternoons.
- Fracto (2000–2005): An original production dedicated to the fusion of animation and electronic music, featuring music videos by artists promoted by the channel.
- Japan OK! (2002–2003): An anime block featuring consecutive episodes, with one episode per series airing every Saturday night into the early hours of Sunday morning.
- Japanimotion (2000–2003): A series dedicated to the broadcast of OVAs and Japanese animated films.
- Kápsula (2002–2003): A microprogram dedicated to experimental video, featuring music videos created by various record labels, directors, and prominent design and animation studios of the period, including Warp, MK12, Lobo, Lynn Fox, Doma, and Zinestesia, among others.
- Locotomia (1997–2005): A program dedicated to animated shorts from around the world.
- Love Vision (2002–2005): An original production aired during programming breaks, featuring visual shorts used at parties and accompanied by electronic music.
- Noches Locomotion (2002–2003): A prime-time programming block that began at 9:00 p.m.
- Replay (2002–2003): A Sunday block dedicated to reruns of the weekly series broadcast on Noches Locomotion throughout the week.
- Retromotion (1997–2001): A programming block aimed at adult audiences and built around nostalgia, featuring a collection of classics and characters from before the 1980s.

== VJs and design projects ==
Locomotion was not only about adult animation and anime. On the last years of being on air, Locomotion seemed to be interest also in graphic design and techno music (house, lounge and chill-Out).

Locomotion had a 30 min. block, called Fracto, where they featured music and design experiments that could be considered as experimental animation. Thanks to Locomotion, DJs and groups like Boeing (Leonel Castillo) and Miranda! began their career, today being recognized by MTV.

In late 2002, the interstitial Love Vision premiered. Recorded live at Locomotion's studios, the program consisted of one-minute visual sessions created by the channel's VJs, intended for use at parties and synchronized with music from Estatus Discos and Locomotion.

== Web animations ==
In the early 2000s, graphic designers began to dabble in web animation to promote their portfolio and collaborate with other artists. Thus it was that Locomotion Channel, during the second half of its on-screen life, sponsored efforts to bring designers and animators together in time-lapse to win experimental animation shorts. This dynamic brought more content onto the screen, giving it an atmosphere of creativity that showed no limits.

In 2000, Locomotion began developing original content for its web platform, produced using digital animation in Macromedia Flash. One of its earliest productions was El Santos, a series based on the popular Mexican comic strip of the same name, published in the newspaper La Jornada. The animated version consisted of ten episodes intended for exclusive release through the website, with animation produced by the Chilean studio Cineanimadores and the participation of the comic strip's original creators.

The same website also hosted five segments of Teevy. Teevey was a short animation written and directed by Robert Ramsden, animated with [Macromedia Flash software by Simon Pike, accompanied by the catchy melody composed by Phillip Minss at Yellow Bird Studios. Robert Ramsden designed his character especially at the request of the channel. The protagonist of this drawing is a kind of giant dog that lives in a world far from any logic or meaning.

Alongside these two productions, Rudo by Night, a series created by Australians Eddie Mort and Lili Chin, was also launched. Mort and Chin later developed three additional projects for the platform: Dr. Amoeba, The Fuzz, and Afro Baby. Another exclusive project, titled Zeek, was created by Uruguayan artist Alejandro Bica and Argentinians Adrián Sibar and Germán Barraza.

== Acquisition, shutdown and aftermath ==
Locomotion was bought by Sony Pictures Entertainment Latin America in January 2005 from The Hearst Corporation and Corus Entertainment. After the acquisition of the network and until its shutdown, the non-anime shows where dropped from their programming in order to focus more on an all-anime lineup. The network officially ceased to exist at 11:00 a.m. (Mexico time), 12:00 p.m. (Venezuela time), and 1:00 p.m. (Argentina time) on July 31 of the same year (however, Locomotion's broadcast stopped at 4:00 a.m. (Mexico time), 5:00 a.m. (Venezuela time), and 6:00 a.m. (Argentina time) and was replaced by a countdown clock). From then on, the network was transitioned into the Latin American arm of Animax.

Of the programming previously broadcast on Locomotion, only Saber Marionette J, Saber Marionette J to X, Soul Hunter, Serial Experiments Lain, The Candidate for Goddess and Earth Girl Arjuna were picked up and continued by Animax as part of its initial programming. The latter three had been broadcast with Spanish dubs on Locomotion, while they were aired with Portuguese subtitles. When broadcast on Animax, they received Portuguese dubs. By August 2006, all of these series had been removed from the schedule. In addition, several series that premiered on Animax during its launch had been acquired by Locomotion prior to Sony's acquisition of the channel and were subsequently retained by Sony and premiered under the Animax brand.

The international animated shows produced by MTV Networks and broadcast on Locomotion (like South Park, Ren & Stimpy and Æon Flux) were picked up and were shown on a weekend animation block by MTV Latin America in 2004, while Bob & Margaret and Quads! were picked up Adult Swim, The Critic was picked up HBO Family. By the end of Locomotion's existence, all the shows (with the exception of South Park) were cancelled, though South Park continues to air as of present day, and recently now airs on a localized version of its home network.
