= BeTV (Asia Pacific) =

- Country: Singapore
- Broadcast area: Southeast Asia
- Headquarters: No. 10 Changi Business Park Central 2 #03-01; Hansapoint @ CBP; Changi, Singapore

Programming
- Picture format: 1080i HDTV

Ownership
- Owner: Sony Pictures Television
- Sister channels: AXN Asia; Animax Asia; Sony Channel; ONE (Korean); GEM

History
- Launched: 2 April 2012; 14 years ago
- Replaced: AXN Beyond
- Closed: 30 September 2015; 10 years ago
- Replaced by: Sony Channel (15 October 2014; Philippines only); GEM TV (1 October 2015; Hong Kong, Indonesia and Thailand)

Links
- Website: Southeast Asian website Malaysia and Philippines website

BeTV was a pay television channel, owned by Sony Pictures Entertainment in the Asia-Pacific region. Launched on 2 April 2012, it replaced AXN Beyond as a spin-off of AXN Asia and Sony Entertainment Television. Selected programs from AXN Philippines and SET were exclusively available in the Philippine feed of the channel.

AXN Beyond HD, renamed BeTV HD on 2 April 2012. The renamed channel would become the first channel that ceases to be carried on Astro B.yond HD and Astro B.yond PVR on 26 August 2013 at midnight.

BeTV was finally shut down on 15 October 2014 due to its merger with SET to form Sony Channel.

== Feeds ==
- Southeast Asian feed: available for most countries in the region. It lasted two months, from 1 August until 30 September 2015.
- Philippine feed: available only to that certain country. Its programming schedule was similar to the Southeast Asian feed, with local advertisements and featuring programming imported from AXN and SET. It was shut down in October 2014.
- Malaysian feed: – It branched off the Southeast Asian feed. Its HD feed ceased broadcasting on 26 August 2013)

== Programming ==
The channel mainly aired popular shows and movies syndicated from the United Kingdom and the United States.

== See also ==
- AXN Asia
- Animax Asia
- GEM
- ONE
- Sony Channel
- SET Asia (Indian region)
- List of programs broadcast by BeTV (Asia Pacific)
