= BeTV =

BeTV may refer to:

- BeTV (Asia Pacific), a cable and satellite TV channel in the Asia-Pacific, formerly AXN Beyond in Asia (including Malaysia/Singapore/Philippines) and currently renamed as Sony Channel in the Philippines.
- BeTV (Belgium), a Belgian satellite broadcasting company.
- BeTV (Burundi), a private television channel in Bujumbura, capital city of Burundi.
