= AXN Beyond =

Asian pay TV channel

- Final logo used from 4 December 2010 to 2 April 2012
- Country: Singapore
- Broadcast area: Southeast Asia
- Headquarters: Number. 10 Changi Business Park Central 2 #03-01; Hansapoint @ CBP; Changi, East Region; Downtown Core 486030; Singapore

Programming
- Picture format: 1080i (HDTV)

Ownership
- Owner: Sony Pictures Television
- Sister channels: AXN Asia; Animax Asia; SET South East Asia; SET One (Korean); AXN Sci Fi (Central Europe); SET Asia (Hindi); SET Max (Hindi); Sony Spin (Latin America)

History
- Launched: 1 January 2008; 18 years ago (as AXN Beyond Asia); 30 August 2010; 16 years ago (as AXN Beyond Malaysia); 4 December 2010; 15 years ago (as AXN Beyond Philippines)
- Closed: 1 April 2012; 14 years ago
- Replaced by: BeTV (effective on 2 April 2012)

Logo used from 1 January 2008 to 3 December 2010.

AXN Beyond was a pay television channel, owned by Sony Pictures Television in the Asia-Pacific region. It was launched on January 1, 2008.

== History ==
The channel first launched on January 1, 2008 in Philippines through SkyCable. Then it premiered in Singapore in May 27, 2008, in Hong Kong on April 1, 2009, in Indonesia in September 2009 and in Malaysia on August 30, 2010. The programming broadcast by the channel is centrated to paranormal, sci-fi, suspense, horror and mystery/fantasy. It ceased broadcasting on April 2, 2012, being replaced by BeTV.

== Feeds ==
- Southeast Asian feed - available in Singapore, Hong Kong, Thailand, Indonesia and Malaysia
- Philippine feed - branched off from the Southeast Asian feed; shared the same schedule as the Malaysian feed.
- Malaysian feed - branched off from the Southeast Asian feed. Only channel to natively broadcast in HD.

== Programmes ==
=== Paranormal and science fiction ===
- Alice
- Andromeda
- Being Human (UK)
- Being Human (US)
- Buffy the Vampire Slayer
- Camelot
- Caprica
- Charmed
- CHAOS
- Combat Hospital
- Dark Angel
- Falling Skies
- Hex
- Jake 2.0
- Journeyman
- Lost
- Life on Mars
- Masters of Science Fiction
- Moonlight
- Mysterious Ways
- Night Stalker
- Northern Mysteries
- Painkiller Jane
- Pushing Daisies
- Roswell
- Sleepwalkers
- Supernatural
- Teen Wolf
- The 4400
- The Dresden Files
- The X-Files
- True Blood

=== Drama ===
- A Gifted Man
- Camelot
- Chuck
- Desperate Housewives
- Drop Dead Diva
- Eli Stone
- Grey's Anatomy
- Jericho
- Necessary Roughness
- Pan Am
- Reaper
- Sherlock

=== Comedy ===
- Better Off Ted

=== Reality & documentaries ===
- Breaking the Magician's Code: Magic's Biggest Secrets Finally Revealed
- Criss Angel: Mindfreak
- David Blaine: Street Magic
- David Blaine: Magic Man
- David Blaine: Vertigo
- David Blaine: Frozen In Time
- David Blaine: Drowned Alive
- David Blaine: What is Magic?
- Destination Truth
- Estate of Panic
- Face Off
- Flipping Out
- Ghost Adventures
- Haunting Evidence
- Keith Barry: Extraordinary
- Keith Barry: The Escape
- Magic Asia India
- Mondo Magic Singapore
- Ripley's Believe It or Not
- Scare Tactics
- Sony Style TV Magazine
- The Duke
- The Real Housewives of New York City
- Top Chef

=== Movies, miniseries and specials ===
- 7eventy 5ive
- Alice
- Atomic Twister
- CJ7
- Coma
- Dangerous Waters: Shark Attack
- Deep Rescue
- Darkman
- Dead Birds
- Devour
- Dr. Jekyll and Mr. Hyde (2008)
- Dragonheart
- Exquisite Corpse
- Fallen
- Ghosts of Mars
- Heartland Ghost
- I Still Know What You Did Last Summer
- Idle Hands
- Impact
- Locust: Day of Destruction
- Mary Reilly
- Mercury Rising
- Nature of the Beast
- Omega Doom
- Persons Unknown
- Rose Red
- San Diego Comic-Con 2010
- Scream Awards
- Species
- Species II
- Species III
- Species: The Awakening
- Still Small Voices
- Storm Seekers
- Suck
- The Breed
- The Prisoner
- The Sacred
- Texas Chainsaw Massacre: The Next Generation
- Tornado Valley
- Toxic Skies
- Urban Legend
- Urban Legends: Bloody Mary
- Urban Legends: Final Cut
- Vampires: The Turning
- Werewolves: The Dark Survivors
- Wild Fires
- Wolf Lake

=== Animation ===
- Afterworld
- Dragon Ball Z Kai
- Final Fantasy: The Spirits Within
- Spectacular Spider-Man
- Super Hero Squad Show
- Transformers Animated
- Yu-Gi-Oh!
- Yu-Gi-Oh! Zexal

== See also ==
- BeTV (Asia Pacific)
