= Animax India =

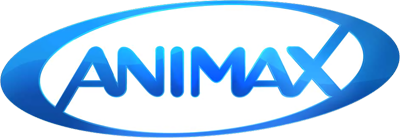
- Country: India
- Broadcast area: South Asia
- Network: Animax
- Headquarters: Mumbai, India

Programming
- Languages: Japanese; English; Hindi (2004–2006)
- Picture format: 1080i HDTV

Ownership
- Owner: Sony Pictures Networks India

History
- Launched: 5 July 2004; 22 years ago
- Closed: 18 April 2017; 9 years ago
- Replaced by: Sony YAY! Animax Asia

Animax India was an Indian television channel owned by Sony Pictures Networks India that launched in 2004. The channel primarily aired anime series and films dubbed in Hindi and, for a period, English, as well as with subtitles. It was the only channel in India to simulcast anime series on the same day as Japan.

On 18 April 2017, Animax ceased broadcasting in India. The channel would be succeeded by Animax's Asian feed.

== History ==
=== Original format ===
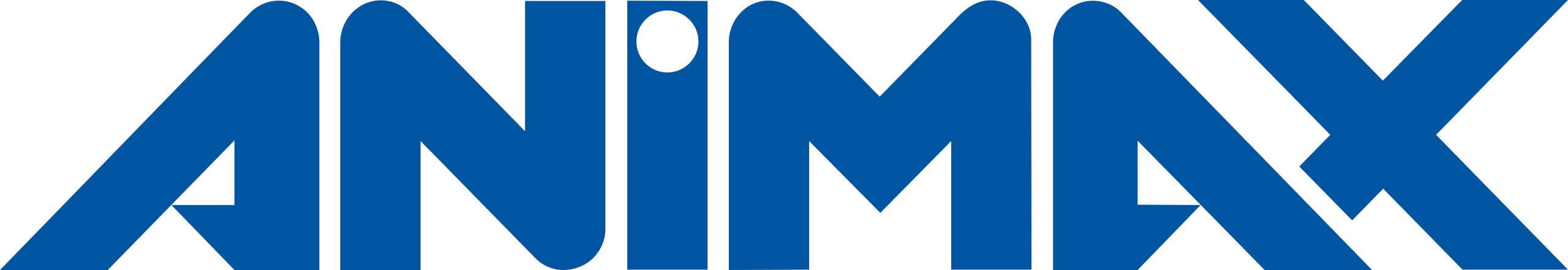
Animax's logo between 2010 and 2013.

Animax began operations across India and the rest of the Indian subcontinent on 5 July 2004 with Irfan Pathan as a brand ambassador. It was operated and broadcast from Singapore by Animax Asia and distributed by Sony Pictures Networks India Pvt. Ltd. It was also the first animation channel that targeted the age 15–25 demographic and was the only channel in India to simulcast anime in the same week and on the same day as Japan. Animax India started with 12 hours Hindi feed that targeted young kids and teens ages 7–14 and it had planned to launch Hindi and English language audio tracks.

An Animax-branded Hindi block, "Animax Kool Kidz", was launched on Sony Entertainment Television from 5 December 2004. This block featured shows like Astro Boy, Cyborg 009, Daigunder, Fancy Lala, Princess Comet, Princess Sarah, Princess Tutu, Tales of Little Women and UFO Baby.

From 15 August 2006, Animax entirely shut down its Hindi feed but kept its English one, since it changed its target audience to the ages 15–24 group.

In 2007, the network would begin airing live-action content like Tech Max, Game Max, Animax Press Play, Imagination and Speak Out and movies like Spider-Man 2, Kung Fu Hustle and Hellboy.

On 1 January 2008, Animax South Asia merged with Animax Asia's but had a separate feed for India. Animax became the first channel to simulcast Tears to Tiara on April 6, 2009, Animax also aired Korean entertainment shows like Live Power Music, Pretty Boys & Girls and Comedy Boot Camp in Korean audio with English subtitles.

Animax India rebranded its logo along with Singapore on 4 May 2010.

Animax added American reality shows to their list with the premiere of Scare Tactics. Animax also simulcasted the yearly Video Game Awards hosted by Spike TV.

With the premiere of Nura: Rise of the Yokai Clan, Animax stopped dubbing anime and started airing them in Japanese audio with English subtitles instead. However, Animax continued to dub a few anime shows like the second season of The Melancholy of Haruhi Suzumiya. Animax continued to simulcast all the shows aired on AXN, its sister channel. The shows Ghost Adventures, Chuck and Fear Itself were originally aired on AXN India. In 2012, the channel stopped airing such shows and reverted to its old logo, focusing only on anime. Moreover, all DTH providers in India delisted Animax as the channel couldn't pay carriage fees. Animax made its way back into the DTH networks in 2016 with its addition on Tata Sky at LCN 686.

Animax's logo as seen before 2010.

=== Closure ===
Animax ceased broadcasting in India on 18 April 2017. The last show to air on Animax was the French animated series Space Goofs.

The Asian feed would launch on Sony's Indian digital platform, Sony LIV, as a replacement. On 8 May 2020, the Asian feed would cease streaming on Sony LIV as a result of KC Global Media's acquisition of several Asian Sony-owned networks .

Three years later, Animax Asia would resume broadcasting on the streaming platform JioTV on 20 January 2023. Animax, along with sister brand Gem, would also begin streaming on Prime Video that same year.

== See also ==
- Animax
  - Animax Asia
