= Sony Channel (Southeast Asia) =

Sony Channel Asia
- Country: Singapore; Indonesia; Malaysia; Philippines; Hong Kong; Thailand
- Broadcast area: Southeast Asia
- Network: Sony Pictures Television
- Headquarters: No. 10 Changi Business Park Central 2 #03-01; Hansapoint @ CBP; Changi, Singapore; Unit 15A BDO Equitable Tower, Makati, Philippines

Programming
- Languages: English; Mandarin; Cantonese; Thai; Malay; Indonesian
- Picture format: 1080i HDTV

Ownership
- Owner: Sony Pictures Television
- Sister channels: AXN Asia; Animax Asia; Sony ONE (Korean); Sony Gem; SET Asia (Hindi); Sony MAX (Hindi)

History
- Launched: 1 July 2007; 19 years ago
- Closed: 1 June 2019; 7 years ago
- Former names: Sony Entertainment Television (2008–2014)

Links
- Website: www.sonychannelasia.com

Sony Channel (formerly Sony Entertainment Television) was a Southeast Asian pay television channel broadcasting to Hong Kong and Southeast Asia, owned by Sony Pictures Entertainment. It was launched in July 2007 as an entertainment channel, and adopted its current name on 15 October 2014.

As a part of a plan to relaunch BeTV as Gem, all non-Asian programmes on BeTV were moved to Sony Channel, effective 15 October 2014. The channel was the female counterpoint to a predominantly male AXN.

Sony Channel ceased broadcasting across Asia including Malaysia, Philippines, Hong Kong and Singapore on June 1, 2019 at midnight, while in Indonesia and Thailand the channel was discontinued a day earlier. The channel programmed with the final episode of Superstore; on that day, an ending with the season four finale encore "Employee Appreciation Day" as one of the last express from the U. S. telecast including full season binge before going off-the-air while a final farewell on-screen message card and the words "Sony Channel has ceased broadcasting in Asia. We thank you for continual support." Most of the favourite programs of Sony Channel will also be shown on AXN. On Cignal in the Philippines, its EPG slot was given to Blue Ant Entertainment.

== Feeds ==
- Main feed: distributed on Malaysia, Singapore, Maldives, Hong Kong, Thailand, Sri Lanka and Indonesia, with an additional HD simulcast feed available.
- Philippines feed: branched from the Main feed; shares schedule with additional shows from AXN and local advertisement.

== Programming ==
=== Final programming ===
- Chasing Life (Season 1)
- Dr. Ken
- Grey's Anatomy (Seasons 8 to 11)
- How to Get Away with Murder
- Madam Secretary (Season 1 to 5)
- Make You Laugh Out Loud
- Marlon
- Million Dollar Matchmaker
- Minute to Win It – Australia
- Superstore (Season 1 to 4)
- Younger

=== Drama ===
- The Art of More
- Body of Proof
- The Borgias
- Chicago Justice
- Chicago Med
- Code Black
- Conviction
- Damages
- Desperate Housewives
- Drop Dead Diva
- Ghost Whisperer
- Gone
- Hidden Palms
- Jane the Virgin
- Justified (Seasons 5 and 6)
- Law & Order True Crime
- Monster Man
- Nashville (Seasons 1 and 2)
- Necessary Roughness
- The Night Shift (Seasons 1 to 4)
- Satisfaction
- Scandal (Season 1 and 3)
- Sherlock (Seasons 1 and 2)
- State of Affairs
- Sweet Home Alabama
- Teen Wolf (Seasons 1 and 6)
- Touched by an Angel (Seasons 6 to 9)
- The Whispers

=== Comedy ===
- Baby Daddy
- Bad Judge
- Better Late Than Never
- The Carmichael Show
- Casual
- Crowded
- Everybody Loves Raymond
- Girlfriends' Guide to Divorce
- Great News
- Manhattan Love Story
- Men at Work
- Odd Mom Out
- Playing House (Seasons 1 to 3)
- Rob
- Sex and the City
- Spy
- Truth Be Told

=== Reality/Game Show ===
- Adventure Your Way
- American Idol (Season 17)
- The Apartment - Passion For Design (Season 6)
- The Apartment - Rising Stars (Season 5)
- Asia's Got Talent (Season 1)
- Breaking the Magician's Code
- Cupcake Wars (Seasons 1 to 4)
- Cyril: Simply Magic
- Cyril's Family Vacation: Hawaii Edition
- Cyril's Rio Magic
- Cyrus vs. Cyrus: Design and Conquer
- Face Off (Seasons 1 to 4)
- Fashion Hunters
- Flipping Out
- Hollywood Unzipped: Stylist Wars
- Hair Battle Spectacular
- Love Broker
- Masters of Illusion
- The Millionaire Matchmaker
- Minute to Win It
- Minute to Win It – U.K.
- Monica the Medium
- Nail'd It!
- Pregnant in Heels
- The Rachel Zoe Project
- The Real Housewives of New York City (Season 6)
- Stars in Style
- Style by Jury
- Top 20 Funniest (Seasons 1 and 2)
- Top Chef (Seasons 1 to 13)
- Top Chef Duels (Seasons 1 and 2)
- Top Chef Just Desserts
- Top Chef Masters
- The Voice (Seasons 3 and 9)
- Worst Cooks in America (Seasons 2 to 5)

=== News magazine and lifestyle ===
- E BUZZ
- Sony Style TV Magazine
- Sweet Julia with Julia Baker

=== Movie Block ===
- Sony Channel Movie Flicks
