= AXN (Asian TV channel) =

Asian pay television channel

AXN (Asia)
- Country: Singapore
- Broadcast area: Cambodia, Hong Kong, Indonesia, Macau, Malaysia, Maldives, Mongolia, Myanmar, Palau, Philippines, Singapore, Sri Lanka, Taiwan, Thailand, Vietnam
- Network: KC Global Media Asia
- Headquarters: Number 10, Changi Business Park Central 2 #03-01, Hansapoint @ Changi Business Park, Changi, Singapore

Programming
- Languages: English; Malay; Indonesian; Mandarin Chinese; Tamil; Cantonese; Thai; Vietnamese (Subtitles)
- Picture format: HDTV 1080i

Ownership
- Owner: Sony Pictures Entertainment (2004–2020); KC Global Media Asia Entertainment
- Sister channels: Animax; JOURNY TV; KCM

History
- Launched: 21 September 1997; 29 years ago

Links
- Website: www.axn-asia.com

Availability

Terrestrial
- TrueVisions: LCN 336
- MNC Vision: LCN 154
- Astro: LCN 701
- Transvision: LCN 301
- K Vision: LCN 90
- Dialog TV: LCN 111
- Skynet: LCN 28
- StarHub TV: LCN 511
- Cignal TV: LCN 121
- SatLite: LCN 93

AXN logo (2001–2015)

AXN is a pan-Asian pay television channel owned by KC Global Media Asia and headquartered in Singapore. The channel primarily airs action shows and police procedural dramas, with most of its content originating in North America. Formerly a wholly owned subsidiary of Sony Pictures Entertainment, AXN's operations in the Asia Pacific, Middle East, and Africa were sold to KC Global Media Entertainment in January 2020.

== Programming ==
AXN primarily broadcasts American and British television programs. Its content is sourced from major production studios, including Sony Pictures Television, Paramount Global Content Distribution, NBCUniversal Television, Lionsgate, and Fremantle. AXN's wide range of partnerships enables it to air television episodes the same day they premiere in the United States. It also acquires recently released, high-profile American films from Sony Pictures (Columbia Pictures and TriStar Pictures) and other Hollywood film studios. AXN occasionally features region-specific programming tailored to Southeast Asian audiences and airs special events, including the annual Rose Parade and the ContentAsia Awards.

In 2025, the channel briefly incorporated sporting events to its schedule; its portfolio included pan-regional broadcast rights to the 2025 season LIV Golf tournaments and select Taiwan Professional Basketball League games, which are currently only available on AXN's official YouTube channel.

=== Anime programmes ===
During the late 1990s and early 2000s, AXN featured a variety of anime series, many of which were broadcast in Japanese with English subtitles. The channel also organized annual anime festivals across Southeast Asia, catering to the growing interest in Japanese animation within the region at the time.

AXN's anime content was moved to its sister channel, Animax Asia, in 2004; the shift had been planned since the late 1990s. Despite this, AXN began to reintroduce English-dubbed anime programs from Animax Asia in the Philippines during morning and late-afternoon time slots in the 2010s. It again stopped airing anime in August, 2016 as AXN shifted its focus back to its core content.

== Original productions ==
- Adventure Your Way

adventure show; hosted by Atom Araullo.

- The Amazing Race Asia

a local version of the American reality competition series The Amazing Race; the fifth season premiered in 2016.

- The Apartment
- The Apprentice Asia

premiered in 2013, revived as The Apprentice: ONE Championship Edition in 2021.

- Asia's Got Talent

premiered in 2015; second season premiered in 2017; third season to air in late 2018.

- Cash Cab Asia
- The Contender Asia

Muay Thai boxing reality show similar to The Contender; season 1 premiered on 16 January 2008.

- The Duke

men's lifestyle magazine talk show; season 1 premiered in 2009.

- e-Buzz

entertainment news show, hosted by Jaymee Ong; ended.

- The Kitchen Musical (was available in Singapore)
- Sony Style

lifestyle and entertainment magazine show sponsored by Sony; seasons two and three hosted by Oli Pettigrew.

- Ultimate Escape

holiday adventure show; the first season aired from 29 October 2007 to 19 November 2007.

- Project GO

business reality competition; premiered in 2021.

== Feeds ==
The channel maintains two primary feeds: one tailored exclusively for viewers in Hong Kong and Thailand, and another for the broader Southeast Asian audience. Programming is the same except for local advertising. Additionally, the Filipino feed occasionally adjusts its programming due to specific broadcast considerations.

=== Current feeds ===
- AXN Southeast Asia (based in Singapore)
- AXN Philippines (separated from the SEA feed, including local advertisements and movies)
- AXN Taiwan (separated from the SEA feed including local advertisements and movies)
- AXN Vietnam (SEA feed delayed with certain programming replaced)

=== Former feeds ===
- AXN India
- AXN Japan (separated from the SEA feed including local advertisements, sold to Nojima in 2021 and relaunched as Action Channel – used subtitles in October 2023)
- AXN Korea (joint venture with CU Media – airs local shows alongside international shows; replaced by NXT in 2025)
- AXN Mystery (separated from the SEA feed including local advertisements, sold to Nojima in 2021 and relaunched as Mystery Channel – used subtitles in October 2023)
- AXN Beyond (later known as BeTV, Sony Channel; now defunct)

== AXN HD ==
AXN first launched its high-definition feed in South Korea on 1 March 2009. This was made available in Singapore on StarHub TV from 25 May 2010. In Malaysia, it was launched on 16 June 2010 on Astro and 1 October 2023 on NJOI. In Thailand, it was launched on 12 July 2011 on TrueVisions; in India, on Videocon D2H on 19 July 2014. The HD feed premiered in Sri Lanka on Dialog TV in 2013. In the Philippines it was launched on 20 April 2015; and on SkyCable, Sky Direct, Cignal and Singtel TV in Singapore.

== See also ==
- Animax
- AXN
- AXN Beyond (former TV channel)
- BeTV (former TV channel)
- Sony Channel (Asia) (former TV channel known as SET South East Asia)
- ONE (former TV channel)
- GEM (former TV channel)
