= KC Global Media =

American media company

- Type: Private
- Industry: Mass media
- Founded: 2019; 7 years ago
- Founders: Andy Kaplan; George Chien
- Headquarters: Los Angeles, United States
- Area served: Worldwide
- Products: Television production Television channels Content distribution
- Divisions: KGCM Distribution
- Website: www.kcglobalmedia.com

KC Global Media is a US-based media company, operating in the linear and FAST television market, mostly in Asia. Based in Los Angeles, it has offices in Seoul, Taipei, Manila and Singapore.

== History ==
The company was founded in 2019 when Sony Pictures Television Networks decided, as part of a strategic review, to sell its Southeast Asian networks to SPT's former executives Andy Kaplan and George Chien (whose surnames form the KC initials). The sale was finalized in January 2020; with that, the company granted its ownership of the latter linear networks (AXN, Animax and ONE). The Indian subsidiary was excluded from the deal. On 11 May 2020, the sale was completed, and the terms were amended to include Sony's GEM channel.

The company was set up to create synergies between Hollywood and the film and television industries in Asia, its core territory. On 7 February 2023, it relaunched Animax into India, under KC's control, on the Jio TV platform. The Korean version of Animax was sold to Aniplus in April and was approved by Korean regulators in June. On 21 November that year, it launched its first FAST channel, KCM, in Southeast Asia and India, carrying drama, movies and factual content. In July 2025, it partnered with NextTrip to launch a linear and FAST JOURNY television channel in the Asian region.

In January 2025, KCGM formally launched its content distribution unit with the focus on licensing and distributing film and television content from Asian countries.

== Channels ==
=== Current ===
- AXN
- Animax
- KCM
- JOURNY (partnership with NextTrip)

=== Former ===
- ONE
- GEM

== Content distribution ==
These are produced by various third-party film/TV productions, and KC Global Media handles international licensing/distribution rights to these titles.

- M Mission (2024)
- Decalcomania (2025)
- Lost & Found (2026)
- Drug War: A Conspiracy of Silence (2026)
- Laya (2026)
