= List of Tears to Tiara episodes =

The cover of the first DVD compilation for Tears to Tiara released by Pony Canyon

Tears to Tiara is an anime series adapted from the PlayStation 3 remake of the same title developed and published by Aquaplus. Produced by White Fox and directed by Tomoki Kobayashi, the series was broadcast simultaneously in Japan and Asia on Chiba TV and Animax Asia respectively from April 5 to September 27, 2009, making it the first anime to have a new world record for the fastest broadcast outside Japan. Tears to Tiara is broadcast in Animax Asia with English subtitles in Singapore and other local languages subtitles in each market area of Asia.

The story is set in a world based on British, Celtic & Roman mythology during the Dark Ages. The series follows the adventures of demon lord Arawn, who has been resurrected since his death 1,000 years ago by Drwc, a priest from the Divine Empire. Offering a girl named Riannon, a descendant of the Elf King Pwyll as a sacrifice, Drwc plots to use Arawn's powers for world domination. However, Arawn refuses the sacrifice and kills Drwc instead, thwarting his plans. Grateful for saving her, she makes him her husband and Chief of her people, the Gael Tribe. Together with Arthur, Riannon's older brother and The tribe's First Warrior and Ogam, a wizard and an old friend of Arawn and the siblings, Arawn leads the tribe along with a group of warriors who follows them against the Empire who plans to destroy all those who oppose them.

Three pieces of theme music are used for the series. The opening theme, titled Free and Dream, performed by Suara. The two ending themes, "Blue sky, True sky" and "Weeping alone", are performed by Aira Yuhki. Eight DVD compilations of the series were released by Pony Canyon; the first was released on June 17, 2009, and the last was released on January 20, 2010, with the first two volumes containing four episodes and the remaining volumes containing three episodes. In November 2009, Sentai Filmworks announced they have licensed the series for North American release. The DVD compilations were initially released with English subtitles, and the DVD/Blu-ray compilations released in 2010 included an English-language dub.

== Episode list ==
No.	Title	Original release date	English release date
1	"Demon King Resurrection"; Transliteration: "Maō Fukkatsu" (Japanese: 魔王復活)	April 5, 2009	July 22, 2010
Drwc, a high priest commanding an army of imperial soldiers, invades the Gael village at the Erin late at night, only to see that the princess Riannon is the only one there, soon disbelieving her explanation that all of the villagers went hunting. Though he threatens to have her tortured, he then realizes that she is a descendant of the elf king Pwyll as he plans to use her as a living sacrifice to revive the demon king Arawn so he may use his powers to rule the world. Riannon attempts to commit suicide in retaliation, but she is forced to surrender and cooperate when Dwrc tries to endanger the lives of two captured children. She is put under his mind control spell after she reveals her true name to him. Meanwhile, after returning home from a hunting trip, first warrior Arthur, learning of what has happened to Riannon, leads a small task force to rescue his younger sister at the tomb. By the time Arthur arrives in the inner sanctum of the tomb, having fought off several imperial soldiers guarding the place along the way, Drwc and his mages have finally revived Arawn, who takes the form of an albino man and approaches Riannon.
2	"The People of the Vow"; Transliteration: "Seiyaku no Tami" (Japanese: 誓約の民)	April 12, 2009	July 23, 2010
Drwc uses Riannon as leverage to prevent Arthur from attacking, but they are not aware that Arawn has dived into Riannon's subconscious to release her from Drwc's spell. Even though Arawn rescues Riannon and kills Dwrc by stabbing him in the back with his sword, Arthur hinders from trusting Arawn due to his title and fights him. To prevent both of them from killing each other, Riannon wraps her red scarf around Arawn, choosing him to be her husband as well as the tribe's chieftain, much to Arthur's dismay. As skeleton warriors start to emerge, the three of them try to escape until they meet an elderly wizard named Ogam, who leads them to exit with the rest of the task force. Knowing there will be repercussions once the Divine Empire learns about Drwc's fate, Arthur rallies his people for the upcoming war against the empire. Meanwhile, Gaius, lord of the imperial army, has learned of Drwc's death and must now crush this rising rebellion.
3	"Departure"; Transliteration: "Tabidachi" (Japanese: 旅立ち)	April 19, 2009	July 26, 2010
Arawn is suddenly attacked by a young woman named Morgan. Although Morgan is armed with a bow, arrows, and a dagger Arawn easily overpowers her. It is unfortunate that Morgan failed to prepare a ship to Albion since it had been captured by imperial soldiers, and Arthur holds himself accountable for having assigned her this job. In response, Arawn proposes that he will take custody of Morgan, more or less his mistress. As Arawn leads the tribe to take over the ship and escape, he is confronted by Gaius himself, who wants to know his reason for wanting to overthrow the Divine Empire. As Arawn then escapes into the ship, Gaius throws a dagger at him which he easily blocks. However, the dagger that hit him was made of electrum, the same material that killed Arawn a thousand years ago. As Ogam heals his wound, he reveals that the empire came to be after a bloody civil war that ended the Albion Kingdom when no heir was chosen after Pwyll died. Arthur later challenges Arawn to a duel at night. Yet, upon losing the match, Arthur requests Arawn to treat Riannon well for his sake. As sunrise arrives, the ship finally reaches toward Albion.
4	"Avalon"; Transliteration: "Avaron" (Japanese: アヴァロン)	April 26, 2009	July 27, 2010
After arriving at Albion, Arawn leads the tribe to Avalon, a castle where they are greeted by two house elves, Limwris and Ermin. Limwris is surprised to learn that Arthur and Riannon are Pwyll's descendants. As they are given a tour around Avalon, Limwris reveals that the numbers of elves living here have dwindle and the castle was made by the spirits. Morgan explains that Arthur despises all spirits, as he wants to exact revenge on the glowing white spirit that killed his father during his childhood. While exploring an armory, Arawn and Arthur are trapped by a magic spell cast by Epona, a merchant elf who at first mistaken them for thieves. As the tribe hunt giant crabs for food using a crab flute, Arawn leaves the feast only to find Riannon praying at a cliff. There he learns she is praying for the god Myrddin, who gave fire to humans and was punished by the other gods. Arawn comments the god is not suffering anymore as he is always with them as part of this world, which makes Riannon wonder if Arawn have meet Myrddin before in his time. Arawn later comments at how Riannon and Arthur are amazed with the land they are standing on.
5	"Londinium"; Transliteration: "Rondiniumu" (Japanese: ロンディニウム)	May 3, 2009	July 28, 2010
At night, Arawn and Ogam discuss the possibility of the Divine Empire catching on to them and how they do not have a proper defense or weaponry yet. The next morning, Arthur drags Arawn on another hunting trip, but find that they cannot hunt as they are on another tribe's hunting territory. At dinner, Morgan becomes drunk and challenges Arthur for the title of first warrior, but the duel is stopped when everyone hears the sound of a lyre, which had been played by a minstrel named Taliesin. After playing a song for them, he reveals that he is aware that they are of the Gael Tribe, but he leaves after telling them they are in the territory of the Brigantes Tribe. The Gael Tribe then sets sail for Londinium for some sightseeing and to follow through with their plan of attack. However, they do not realize that Gaius has already arrived there, waiting for the right moment to intervene. The tribe ambush two soldiers carrying supplies for the front lines, taking the horses and goods on the way to Avalon. Gaius sends an imperial spy as a distraction to be easily defeated, and carts are revealed to be a trap as they all contain sand, forcing them to pull back. At sunset the next day, after Morgan uses the crab flute, a female stranger rises out of the water and comes toward them.
6	"The Merciless Valley"; Transliteration: "Hijō no Tani" (Japanese: 非情の谷)	May 10, 2009	July 29, 2010
After arriving on the shore, the stranger reveals herself as Llyr, who is a sea elf. She has come to celebrate the return of Arawn and is at his disposal from now on. Arawn finds a seal pelt, using it to cook the giant crab that was hunted down. At night, Llyr seems to have lost her precious cloak, her only ticket of returning to her homeland. It turns out that her cloak was made out of seal pelt, the same one that Arawn burned to make fire. Ogam proclaims that Arawn is now to be engaged to Llyr by tribal law as a consequence, since he is unable to return the seal pelt back to her. After the tribe heads back to Avalon, Llyr proves to be bad at chores and housework there. Meanwhile, the imperial soldiers track down the Gael Tribe when they find a cartwheel in a valley on the way to the castle. When the soldiers head deep into the forest, they are ambushed by the tribe. After the death of many soldiers, the knight Octavia takes command and orders a retreat. At the rope bridge, Bublux, Octavia's superior, cuts the bridge leading to several soldiers falling. Octavia is frustrated to know that Bublux would use his soldiers as pawns, and Arawn is thankful to see that Arthur treats the tribe as his comrades.
7	"Colosseum"; Transliteration: "Korosseo" (Japanese: コロッセオ)	May 17, 2009	July 30, 2010
There will be an upcoming fighting tournament held in Londinium, and Morgan hopes to find a rare red branch heirloom there. The group arrives at the Colosseum to watch the tournament. During the first round, a mining elf named Rathty faces against an ogre and wins the match. However, since Rathty looks like a child in appearance, he is forced to forfeit. Though Rathty escapes underground away from the Colosseum, Arawn finds and confronts him, soon finding out that Rathty had planned on winning silvanus ore as the grand prize. During the next round, Octavia faces against Bublux, though Octavia beats him easily. Bublux cheats by sending in a group of chariots with archers. Morgan, who cannot stand the sight of this, aids Octavia in taking them down. They each are impressed with their respective skills, and they then share each other's names. However, Morgan accidentally lets slip that she is among the Gael Tribe, yet Octavia, thanking Morgan for assisting her, says that she will condone the matter. Rathty ends up officially joining the tribe after realizing that Arawn is the demon king.
8	"Rublum"; Transliteration: "Ruburumu" (Japanese: ルブルム)	May 24, 2009	August 2, 2010
Gaius is told by the Imperial Senate that Lydia, leader of the Rublum, has been ordered to take out the Gael Tribe in his place. Limwris shows Arawn a picture book that Ermin had made in honor of him, though it was not as appealing as he had hoped. As a ship approaches deep out on the ocean, the tribe realizes that Lydia is planning to attack them in the forest come sunset. Ogam advises against taking the group lightly, but Arthur chooses to ignore his warning. As a result, the tribesmen are forced to retreat to Avalon. Arthur falls into despair over their defeat, but Arawn brings him to his senses by punching him in the face. Arawn encourages Arthur to come up with an alternative strategy for their next move. At the imperial camp, Octavia discovers the Divine Empire is collecting corpses, but she is then knocked out by an imperial soldier.
9	"Assault"; Transliteration: "Shūgeki" (Japanese: 襲撃)	May 31, 2009	August 3, 2010
Lydia, finding a bound Octavia trapped in a box, sees that the tables have turned between them, recalling how Octavia defeat her as a child. Ever since losing their match at the coliseum, Lydia is emotionally scarred by the memory, wanting to swing her sword at whoever stands in her way. Octavia is to be sent to the mine as punishment for insubordination against her superior and finding out about the corpses. Meanwhile, Rathty leads the tribe to the imperial camp by burrowing a trail underground, stealthily stealing the imperial supplies as payback. While sneaking into the base, Arawn becomes suspicious when he finds a crate full of corpses. He then finds Octavia in another, but he tries to ignore her and fends off Arthur from looking. When the imperial soldiers learn of their presence, Arawn and Arthur distract them while the others escape with the supplies. By the time Lydia has come back to the camp, it is already on up in flames and the thieves have evaded. Octavia, breaking free of her captivity, challenges Arawn to a duel, not knowing he is demon king. He had no intention of taking her prisoner, suggesting her to leave. However, Octavia collapses right in front of Arawn, due to her wound during the duel.
10	"Noble Swordsman"; Transliteration: "Kedakaki Kenshi" (Japanese: 気高き剣士)	June 7, 2009	August 4, 2010
Riannon, after nurturing her back to health and giving back her sword, tells Octavia that Avalon is a place of refuge and the source of hope for all living things. A distrustful Arthur voices his complaints to Arawn of keeping an imperial soldier so close at hand. When Octavia comments to Arthur about his weak swordsmanship, he draws his sword against her, only to be stopped by Riannon. Octavia makes friends with two children, Conal and Elil, offering to teach them about swordsmanship. Arthur learns that Octavia's father was charged with treason by the Imperial Senate, in which her entire family was slain as punishment, being the reason for her joining the imperial army. When Morgan opens a crate of treasure, she finds red coral there, first not knowing it was the heirloom. Morgan is then told by Octavia that her grandfather used red coral, in the form of white powder, to treat an incurable illness she had as a child, as he had valued her life over the heirloom. After Octavia is satisfied sparring with Arthur the next day, she devotes herself never to use her sword to wound but only to protect, now becoming a member of the Gael Tribe.
11	"Requiem"; Transliteration: "Chinkonka" (Japanese: 鎮魂歌)	June 14, 2009	August 5, 2010
Lydia has discovered the location of Avalon, knowing that Octavia is among the Gael Tribe. Arthur believes that Octavia may be in league with them. Morgan witnesses Octavia talking to imperial soldiers in the forest late at night, but she does not want anyone to know about this. Conal and Elil swears to Octavia that they will never go outside the castle without an adult, but this promise is soon broken when the two venture out to search for mushrooms in the forest the following night. Lydia takes Elil hostage, urging Octavia to confront her. Lydia is filled with shame upon remembering to when she was defeated by Octavia in a sacred duel in front of the Imperial Senate, but Octavia walked away from the battle without finishing her off first. The tribesmen comes to the rescue, taking down the imperial soldiers. Octavia reveals that Lydia was the one who did not deliver the final blow during their sacred duel long ago. Octavia proves her loyalty by battling Lydia one last time to the death, winning the match as she mourns for the loss of her best childhood friend.
12	"The Threat of the Empire"; Transliteration: "Teikoku no Kyōi" (Japanese: 帝国の脅威)	June 21, 2009	August 6, 2010
When Riannon is captured by Gaius, Arthur is desperate to save her but Arawn persuades him to wait until they have more information. As such, Arawn plans to enter into a state of meditation to locate Riannon and to check on her safety. Meanwhile, the captive Riannon is making herself useful by healing and feeding the imperial soldiers. Riannon, already accepting her fate, tells Gaius that she wants to help others in need, whether friend or foe. She later disagrees with Gaius for maintain peace through warfare. However, he then says that Riannon's father tried to avoid being associated with the Divine Empire, already understanding the balance between the tribe and the imperial army. Gaius predetermines that his troops will triumph over the tribe, however Riannon still has the flame of hope that Arawn will guide the Gael Tribe to victory. She is quite surprised to see Talesin at the imperial camp, who compares her to that of the elves. Arawn subconsciously calls out to Riannon, and Talesin takes a hit in the arm from a bow and arrow shot when Riannon makes her escape toward the tribe.
13	"Brigantes"; Transliteration: "Burigantesu" (Japanese: ブリガンテス)	June 28, 2009	August 9, 2010
Gaius has begun to prepare a raid against the Gael Tribe. Because of this, Arawn decides it is necessary to form an alliance with the neighboring Brigantes Tribe. Riannon, distraught of having inherited miraculous powers at born, is comforted by Arawn, who tells her not to fear for her inner voice. On the way to the village, Taliesin stops the Gael Tribe, informing that the chieftain of the Brigantes Tribe has died, unable to be replaced by any successor. The prophecy claims that the next chieftain would inevitably suffer a dire fatality if elected. Arthur feels like Taliesin has abandoned his duty as a warrior. Arawn convinces Arthur to engage in a duel against Taliesin to prove his worth. Taliesin knocks Arthur's sword from his hand, ultimately dislocating his shoulder. Arthur admits of losing on purpose because he empathizes for Taliesin, trying to make the fight fairer. Taliesin then declares the match unfinished, and Arthur has his dislocated shoulder fixed. Gaius realizes that Taliesin serves as a double agent with both the tribe and the imperial army.
14	"White Spirit"; Transliteration: "Shiro no Seirei" (Japanese: 白の精霊)	July 5, 2009	August 10, 2010
Since the Gael Tribe is in need of funds, Arawn decides to take Arthur and the others to his tomb where an abundance of treasure is buried. However, when they arrive, they are attacked first by a group of Talos, mechanical guardians of the tomb, soon able to take them out together. As the tribesmen make their way in further, they encounter an ogre which, they are eventually able to defeat with teamwork. Riannon later sees a vision of Pwyll and Primula standing before the coffins of Arawn and Myrddyn, in which Pwyll had promised to reconstruct the place from a shrine to a tomb in honor of Arawn. As Octavia examines a painting on the wall, Arawn depicts the sun as the creator Watos while the thirteen people represent the Twelve White Spirits and one that has been cast out. Arthur tries to make a connection between Arawn and the thirteenth white spirit. Meanwhile, Gaius is called before the Imperial Senate and is accused of rebellion treason by Delator, due to the unnecessary request of more troops and the failure to apprehend the Gael Tribe. Gaius then sends Dekimus to gather soldiers to increase his army despite his charge. Riannon tries to cheer up Arawn at night by making snakes out of oven mitts, worried of what Arthur had depicted from the painting from before.
15	"Candid"; Transliteration: "Kandido" (Japanese: カンディド)	July 12, 2009	August 11, 2010
The Gael Tribe, faced with the threat of war against the imperial soldiers, ventures into the forest to ambush them before they have a chance to attack, but it is realized that the area is enchanted with the power of gravitas. At a swamp blocking their path up ahead, their ancestral tribesmen, slain from the ancient Bronze War emerge, turn into the living dead by the town mayor Creon, siting incantations using the Revival Cauldron. Swords and arrows are completely useless against them, and Llyr and Rathty are growing weaker due to the effects the gravitas has on elves. Arawn, going against Ogam's word, then uses his divine spell called Candid, immediately obliterating the living dead. The spell makes him appear like a glowing white spirit through purification, leaving him weak with burns on his body. Arthur, realizing that Arawn was that glowing white spirit that had killed his father long ago, becomes outraged by this. Though Riannon stands in his way, Arthur runs past her, stabs Arawn in fulfillment of his personal oath, and flees full of grief and guilt when Arawn is left unconscious from his injury.
16	"Reason to Fight"; Transliteration: "Tatakau Riyū" (Japanese: 戦う理由)	July 19, 2009	August 12, 2010
Gaius and his imperial soldiers start to catapult the castle at day, making their advance toward the drawbridge. Riannon talks to the tribesmen in the courtyard, assuring them of Arawn's recovery and Arthur's return. Llyr and Rathty hold off the siege towers scaling the walls. Meanwhile, in the forest at night, Ogam tells Morgan and Octavia that all contact with Avalon was lost, and he suspects a clever trap set by the Divine Empire. He proposes a wait of four days, and sets off to find Arthur. Ogam waits for Arthur at an old shrine the next morning, telling him of the sorrowful memory when he had fought in the ancient Bronze War. Arthur, disbelieving that Ogam is actually a dragon, is explained that the midway moon fell from the sky and destroyed his homeland. When Arthur sees smoke rising out of the castle, Ogam tells him to seek for his reason for fighting, but Arthur does not know where to find the answer. It is soon that boar demons begin to attack the shrine as Arthur struggles with his doubt, up until he realizes that Arawn had treated him like a true friend from the beginning. When an electrum golem stored in the shrine then appears, Ogam transforms into a blue dragon, telling Arthur to run away. Morgan and Octavia, fed up of waiting for Ogam to return, set out alone back to the castle also the next morning. Having disguised themselves as imperial soldiers, the two have their identities exposed while passing through the imperial camp, but they make it back to the castle safely, thanks to Llyr and Rathty.
17	"For Friends"; Transliteration: "Tomo no Tame ni" (Japanese: 友のために)	July 26, 2009	August 13, 2010
Though Arawn has been healed on the third day, he remains in a comatose state. Myrddyn appears to him in his dreams, telling him to remember of how the three eras ended in natural disasters. Then Pwyll and Primula show him the valor with which his comrades, both tribesmen and elves, are fighting to defend Avalon. The two both assure him their deaths were not his fault. The siege towers keep proving ineffective, as Morgan and Octavia are fighting alongside Llyr and Rathty. Dekimus questions Gaius on the justice of this war, to which the latter responds that he would lead a more tolerant country. After a long and arduous journey, Arthur reaches the forest and finds Taliesin, refusing to duel him again. Taliesin notices change in Arthur, who expounds that he had lived his life bound by the tribal covenant and laws. Arthur says that he only fights for his comrades now. He demands Taliesin for him to form an alliance with the Brigantes Tribe. Taliesin then reveals himself to be the prophesied son of the former chieftain, summoning his tribesmen and hands over their command to Arthur. Gaius launches the battering ram toward the castle after gaining control of the drawbridge, forcing the Gael Tribe to draw back in defense. The battering ram breaks through the main door, and Gaius attacks in full force.
18	"Return"; Transliteration: "Kikan" (Japanese: 帰還)	August 2, 2009	August 16, 2010
Arthur and Taliesin, meeting up with Ogam, are now heading toward the castle. Morgan and Octavia continue to fight off the imperial soldiers, while Llyr and Rathty still try to hold off the siege towers. When Gaius breaks past the drawbridge, Arthur, Ogam, and Taliesin come to intervene. Arawn, hearing Arthur's cry for help, has now awaken, and Riannon comes to embrace him in enlightenment. Arthur blocks Gaius from attacking Arawn. Forcing to duel against Arthur, Gaius realizes that Arawn wants to raise Arthur as the new king of the empire. After Arthur literally slices through him, Gaius requests for Arthur to have the lives of his remaining soldiers spared and to create a country of utopia. At the Divine Empire, a figure in white attacks and burns the Imperial Senate to death after revealing to them the death of the emperor.
19	"Child of the Night"; Transliteration: "Yoru no Kodomo" (Japanese: 夜の子供)	August 9, 2009	August 17, 2010
Riannon, helping Limwris and Ermin replanting flowers in the garden, is reminded how Arthur used to weave flower garlands for her as a child. Dekimus reports that the entire Imperial Senate has been slaughtered by one of the Twelve White Spirits, causing an uproar in the Divine Empire. It is seen that Creon is using the Revival Cauldron to send an army of golems toward Albion. The plan is to lure the army to the Chorus Mountain in order to repeal the magic seal on it, which destroying would trigger an avalanche. However, this is only possible with first gaining the assistance of the legendary ice giants. After hanging out with the elves, Riannon goes to see Talesin, where she confirms his prophesied fate. Talesin tells Epona that as a child he heard a singing voice coming from that of a female elf on the night of a full moon deep in the forest. This was the reason for him becoming a minstrel, yet he was not able to obtain the soul of a poet. When everyone is en route to the home of the ice giants, Taliesin encounters first a baby dragon, leading him to a prison. A figure in white, giving off a painful vibe to Taliesin, calls himself Lucifer, promising to show Talesin the truth behind the world.
20	"Lucifer"; Transliteration: "Rukiferu" (Japanese: ルキフェル)	August 16, 2009	August 18, 2010
Long ago, the Twelve White Spirits had gathered in the heavens, questioning why a thirteen white spirit has been created. Merlinus, having told the other white spirits that they cannot completely perceive the will of Watos, is entrusted to raise the thirteen white spirit on his own. The thirteenth white spirit was named Lucifer and referred to Merlinus as his father Myrddin. In return, Myrddin addressed Lucifer as his son Arawn. Although Myrrdin understands that Arawn plans to create a world of pure humanity, he questions what is the purpose to do so. Later on, Myrddin tries to break to Arawn of how the other white spirits has placed the human race under their control, however he initially plans to restore humanity alone. Myrddin brings Arawn in an abandoned underground asylum, filled with human corpses by fault of the other white spirits. When they find a weak human girl on the verge of dying, Myrddin reveals to Arawn that the laws of the white spirits are to demean the inferior beings, much to Arawn's surprise. Myrddin, commanding Arawn not to move, then creates fire for the human girl to feel warmth. He then ends the Ice Age by singing the Song of Beginnings, paid at the price of his own life.
21	"The Song of Beginnings"; Transliteration: "Shogen no Uta" (Japanese: 初源の歌)	August 23, 2009	August 19, 2010
Arawn becomes the twelfth white spirit to replace Myrddin, but he leaves the heavens after realizing that the other white spirits have placed humanity under mind control again. He then frees the human girl, naming her Primula, but he is to live a cursed life exiled from the heavens and losing his white light as a result. Taliesin understands Arawn's past, now knowing what he must do. After parting with the baby dragon and leaving the cave, Taliesin gets his first look at the enemy. Elsewhere, the tribesmen defend the ice giants as they try to start an avalanche. Immediately after the avalanche starts, it is stopped by the snowstorm picking up. Realizing the white spirits are behind this blizzard, Arawn decides they will have to face the golem army at the foot of the mountain. Taliesin then uses the Song of Beginnings to end the blizzard and to start a new avalanche, destroying the golem army, but is seemingly killed.
22	"Dyrnwyn"; Transliteration: "Dānwin" (Japanese: ダーンウィン)	August 30, 2009	August 20, 2010
Arthur, Riannon, Morgan, Octavia, Llyr, and Rathty head towards Gorsedd Arawn, where they are to retrieve the sword Dyrnwyn, one that is linked to the sword Etlym. Upon touching the sword, Arthur is shown a flashback of how Pwyll first met Arawn and Primula. Though Pwyll is against Arawn having taken custody of Primula, Arawn allows Pwyll to possess Dyrnwyn, which is capable of killing an immortal being. Arawn scorns this elf king for falling prey to the laws of the heavens. Having a change of heart, Pwyll promises to join with him on their journey together. While Arthur is watching this scene, the rest of the group attempt to hold back the golems that have surrounded the area. Another flashback is displayed to the aftermath of the ancient Bronze War, of when Ogam tells Pwyll that Arawn had been poisoned by a shot of an Electrum Cannon. Though the bonds tied between the heavens and the earth have finally been shattered, many elves have lost their lives in this bloody war. Arawn and Pwyll use Dyrnwyn to seal the world off from the heavens, before Arawn was to lie dormant in his tomb for recovery. Learning the truth behind the world, Arthur manages to draw this sword from the stone, which encapsulated the entire area in a golden light, causing the golems to disintegrate. The group now head towards Palladium to rejoin their friends.
23	"Palladium"; Transliteration: "Paradiumu" (Japanese: パラディウム)	September 6, 2009	August 23, 2010
Having reunited at Palladium, Arthur and Arawn, along with the rest of their party, enter the tower and prepare for what they hope will be their final battle. However, no sooner do they enter than the group to be separated. Octavia and Morgan find themselves in an arena where they must face off against an army of golems commanded by Creon. Llyr and Rathty stumble upon the Revival Cauldron and agree to find a way to destroy it, though they must first defeat the horde of golems guarding it. Finally, Arawn, Arthur, Ogam and Riannon find themselves encountering a resurrected Drwc. Arthur and Riannon are left to face off against Dwrc, while Arawn and Ogam attempt to remove the obelisk containing the source of gravitas. Drwc attempts to place Riannon under mind control again, but she breaks free with the help of Primula.
24	"Gravitas"; Transliteration: "Guravitasu" (Japanese: グラヴィタス)	September 13, 2009	August 14, 2010
As Arawn and Ogam make their way to the source of gravitas, the others continue to hold the upper hand against the enemy. Right as victory seems apparent, an increase in the amount of gravitas quickly turns the tide of the battle. With things going downhill fast, Ogam prepares to use the Flames of Creation to stop the spell even at the cost of his life. As he does so, Etlym and Dyrnwyn resonate, renewing their strength. Ogam destroys the tip of the obelisk, stopping the flow of gravitas. This allows Llyr and Rathty to destroy the Revival Cauldron, Morgan and Octavia to kill Creon, and Arthur to slay Drwc in front of Riannon. The group reunites at the top of the tower, where they find themselves in a beautiful garden. Riannon feels a cold presence despite the beauty of the garden. There they are shocked to see the corpse of the emperor in the center of the garden, and then the figure in white appears before them.
25	"Merkadis"; Transliteration: "Merukadisu" (Japanese: メルカディス)	September 20, 2009	August 25, 2010
The figure in white, revealed to be Lector, is said to be an astrologist in the Divine Empire. However, he is one among the Twelve White Spirits responsible for the death of Arthur's father, framing Arawn for doing it. Arthur uses Dyrnwyn to destroy the garden, but it turns out to be an illusion. Though Lector states that the laws of the heavens should control humanity, Arawn argues that the human and elves would one day overpower the white spirits. A passageway to the heavens opens and skeleton warriors begin to emerge. Arthur and Arawn fight their way to Lector, while the others take down the skeleton warriors. Arthur, after much struggle, manages to wound Lector with his sword. A furious Lector consequently summons up and merges into the beast Merkadis, destroying the tower. Just as it seems that there is so hope for everyone, they are saved by none other than Taliesin accompanied by the dragons from the mountain.
26	"The Words of Power"; Transliteration: "Chikara no Kotoba" (Japanese: 力の言葉)	September 27, 2009	August 26, 2010
Merkadis, growing immense in size, obliterates the mountain by firing the Electrum Cannon. It then uses its tentacles to scatter the tribesmen, but the others are about to meet up. Ogam reveals that the only way to stop Merkadis is to use the Words of Power, but the only one who can do it is Riannon. Arawn and Arthur buy time for Riannon to remember the Words of Power. They succeed in cutting several tentacles but are unable to main body. Arawn is nearly killed by a shot from the Electrum Cannon, but seeing Pwyll in Arthur encourages him. Riannon remembers the Words of Power with help from Primula. Riannon then recites these words, crippling Merkadis and exposing Lector, as Arthur finally finishes him off for good. Later in Avalon, Pwyll tells Arawn that Arthur must now become the new elf king of Albion and betroth the crown Pendragon. Limwris tells Ermin to continue writing her stories. Octavia continues to teach Conal and Elil swordsmanship, and Morgan seems be an embarrassment to her. Taliesin continues to tease Epona, and Ogam reveals that the truth of the prophecy of the chieftain is that he is fated to stay with his dragon for as long as he lives. Rathty comforts Llyr and forges a commemorative medal for the rebirth of the kingdom. Arawn leaves his sword at Myrddyn's memorial, and Riannon thanks the morning star for his guidance.
