= One (Southeast Asian TV channel) =

Asian pay television channel

ONE
- Logo used from 2020 until 2026
- Country: Singapore
- Broadcast area: Singapore, Malaysia, Indonesia
- Network: KC Global Media Asia
- Headquarters: Number 10, Changi Business Park Central 2 #03-01, Hansapoint @ Changi Business Park, Changi, Singapore

Programming
- Languages: Korean; English (subtitles and bumpers); Indonesian (subtitles and bumpers); Malay (subtitles and bumpers); Mandarin
- Picture format: 1080i HDTV

Ownership
- Owner: KC Global Media Asia
- Sister channels: AXN; Animax

History
- Launched: 1 October 2010; 16 years ago
- Closed: 1 July 2026; 3 months ago
- Replaced by: Astro Daebak (Malaysia)

Links
- Website: www.onetvasia.com

ONE (formerly known as Sony ONE until 2020) was a Southeast Asian pay television channel owned by KC Global Media Asia. ONE was available in Malaysia, Singapore, and Indonesia and was launched on 1 October 2010 at 21:00 SST (20:00 WIB).

The channel's programming consisted of Korean-language series and shows, provided by Seoul Broadcasting System (SBS) and as of most recent Munhwa Broadcasting Corporation (MBC) alongside Viu (linear TV rights for Viu Original K-dramas). ONE's programming is available subtitled in local languages on optional subtitle tracks, depending on the country of reception's market. From October 2017, the contents provided were only available on Singapore and Malaysia until 31 July 2020.

== History ==
The channel launched in Malaysia on the Astro platform on 3 October 2010, entirely in HD.

The channel was the most-watched foreign channel in Singapore and Malaysia in 2015.

In January 2020, Sony Pictures Television sold the channel, along with the Southeast Asian channels Animax, GEM (joined March 2020), and AXN to KC Global Media.

After 16 years of broadcasting, ONE ceased broadcasting on 1 July 2026.
