= Gem (Southeast Asian TV channel) =

Southeast Asian television channel (2014-2024)

GEM
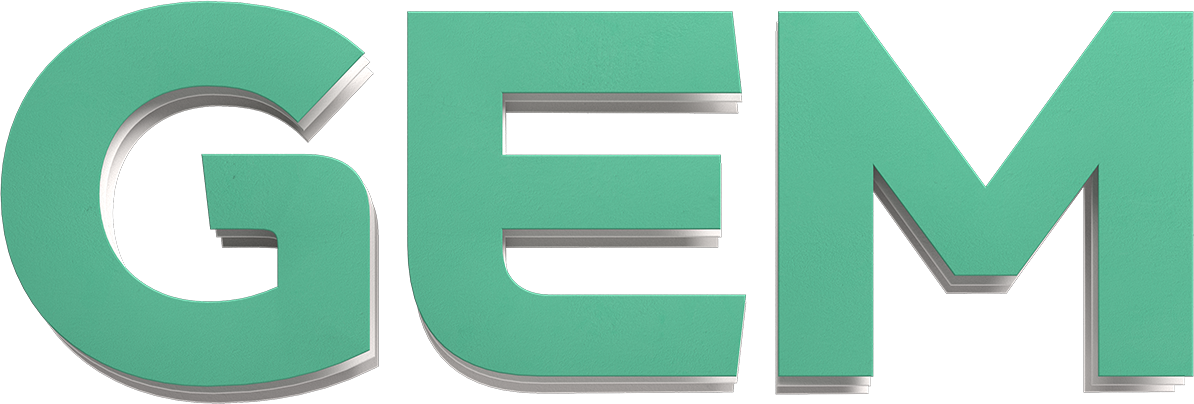
- Final logo from 17 March 2020 until 1 August 2024
- Country: Singapore
- Broadcast area: Southeast Asia
- Headquarters: Number 10, Changi Business Park Central 2 #03-01, Hansapoint @ Changi Business Park, Changi, Singapore

Programming
- Languages: Japanese; English; Mandarin; Cantonese (2015–2021; 2022–2024); Thai; Indonesian; Malay; Vietnamese (2014–2019)
- Picture format: 1080i HDTV

Ownership
- Owner: KC Global Media Asia
- Sister channels: AXN; Animax; ONE

History
- Launched: 1 January 2014; 12 years ago (Vietnam); 1 October 2015; 10 years ago (Hong Kong, Indonesia, Cambodia and Thailand); 17 March 2020; 6 years ago (Singapore and the Philippines); 1 October 2021; 4 years ago (Malaysia); 1 September 2022; 3 years ago (Hong Kong, relaunch)
- Closed: 21 February 2019; 7 years ago (Vietnam); 1 August 2024; 23 months ago
- Former names: Sony GEM (2014–2020)

Links
- Website: https://www.gemtvasia.com

GEM (formerly known as Sony GEM until 2020) was a pay television channel owned by KC Global Media Asia (formerly owned by Sony Asia). This channel was first launched in Vietnam on 1 January 2014 and was subsequently rolled out in other countries in Southeast Asia. In the rest of Southeast Asia, the channel broadcast Japanese-language programming; chiefly from Nippon Television, with subtitles in local languages, while in Vietnam the channel mainly broadcast dramas from Mainland China and South Korea - something also featured on the Southeast Asian channel until June 2018.

On 21 February 2019, the channel closed down in Vietnam due to low audience.

GEM was closed on 1 August 2024 due to low viewers on cable TV, low demand on Japanese TV series as some may not be available outside Japan, and even lack of newer shows, as they shift the focus on their other channels (AXN for English entertainment, Animax for highly-demanded anime series, and ONE for K-drama and K-variety show). Prior to the shutdown, they aired the anime Shadows House mid-season before the series resumed on Animax.
