= Animax (Asian TV channel) =

Asian television network

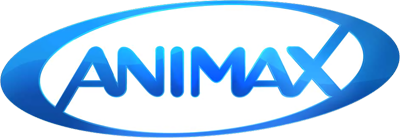
- Country: Singapore
- Broadcast area: Southeast Asia (excluding Brunei and Vietnam); India; Maldives; Mongolia; China (Hong Kong, Macau, Taiwan); Sri Lanka; Thailand
- Network: Animax
- Headquarters: Number 10, Changi Business Park Central 2 #03-01, Hansapoint @ Changi Business Park, Changi, Singapore

Programming
- Languages: Japanese; English; Indonesian; Malay; Mandarin; Cantonese; Thai; Vietnamese (Subtitles, 2020–2024)
- Picture format: 1080i HDTV

Ownership
- Owner: Sony Pictures Entertainment (2004–2020); KC Global Media Entertainment
- Sister channels: AXN; JOURNY TV

History
- Launched: 11 January 2004; 22 years ago
- Closed: 1 January 2022; 4 years ago (Malaysia, Astro only); 1 January 2025; 22 months ago (Vietnam)

Links
- Website: www.animax-asia.com

Availability

Terrestrial
- SatLite: LCN 81
- G Sat: LCN 28
- MNC Vision: LCN 157
- Cignal: LCN 73
- K Vision: LCN 100
- Skynet: LCN 15
- StarHub TV: LCN 532
- Singtel TV: LCN 342

Streaming media
- Jio TV (India): Watch Live
- Prime Video (India): Subscribe
- Samsung TV Plus (India, Singapore, Philippines and Thailand): Samsung TV Plus
- Stream on VLC

Animax is an Asian pay television channel owned by KC Global Media Asia. The channel was originally owned by Sony Pictures Entertainment, and took its name from the Japanese satellite TV network; which was then-majority owned by subsidiary Sony Pictures Entertainment Japan. The channel would be sold to its current owners on January 1, 2020.

Animax is the first television channel in Asia dedicated to anime, and was initially launched in Hong Kong, Taiwan, and Southeast Asia in January 2004. The channel primarily broadcasts Japanese language programming (including same-day simulcasts, and other anime-related content) through English-language feeds in Southeast Asia (excluding Brunei), South and East Asia (excluding Mainland China).

== History ==
On December 17, 2015, Animax Asia announced that it would begin broadcasting in high definition (HD), with high definition channel being a simulcast with its standard definition (SD) channel, carrying the same content. On July 31, 2024, Animax Asia migrated to widescreen format (16:9) on its standard-definition feed, eliminating the use of letterboxing.

=== Hong Kong ===
Animax first launched in Hong Kong on 11 January 2004. It broadcasts a variety of anime programming, from old to modern television series. Animax also airs anime series that premiered in Hong Kong prior to their release in Southeast Asian networks, some of them are Death Note, Blood+, Trinity Blood and Mushishi. After the TV premiere of Gurren Lagann, Animax's TV ratings recorded a huge increase and moved 80% more TRP than its closest competitor, Cartoon Network Asia.

=== Southeast Asia ===
A week after its launch in Hong Kong, Animax was launched in Southeast Asia on 19 January 2004, initially featuring its anime programming exclusively in the original Japanese audio with English subtitling, becoming the company's first English language network. It also later incorporated an English audio dub feed and subtitles in local languages such as Chinese.

Programming blocks seen include "Ani-Chan", which is aired on weekdays at 4:00 pm to 6:00 pm (featuring shows such as Naruto, Danball Senki (a.k.a. Little Battlers eXperience) and Tsubasa Chronicle); "Animania", which is aired on weekdays from 6:00 pm and 6:30 pm (featuring the Dragon Ball franchise and Law of Ueki); "Mega Zone", its prime time programming block is aired on weekdays from 7:00 pm; and its weekend programming block aired every Sunday at 9:00 pm and 10:00 pm.

The channel reached Singapore's Starhub TV in November 2004.

In March 2005, Animax and Singapore's Media Development Authority organized a Storyboard Competition for its viewers in Singapore, Hong Kong and the Philippines using Animax's own characters Quu and Tee.

In June 2006, Animax launched Imagine-Nation, an initiative for featuring "successful people in the arenas of games, film and design".

Animax aired its first animated feature film, LaMB, based on the pop rock band Simple Plan, as a two-parter in March 2009 and in full in April. The film was supposed to air in late 2008 before being delayed to February 2009.

Animax began airing the latest anime titles simultaneously with Japan in March 2009, starting with Tears to Tiara.

Animax launched its video catch-up service in May 2010 along with sister channel AXN.

On July 5, 2013, Animax was forced to close down in Vietnam due to failure to meet Decision No. 20/2011/QD-TTG on Regulations on management of pay television activities issued by the Prime Minister. 7 years later, on 1 April 2020, it was relaunched on VTVCab and later distributed by MSky to other cable or pay TV providers, some titles are available with Vietnamese subtitles, however it was shut down again on January 1, 2025.

==== Malaysia ====
Astro began broadcasting the channel on 31 August 2006 after sometime being aired as a time-block. The channel ceased transmission on January 1, 2022, however selected anime series broadcast by Animax is still made available on Astro's Video-on-Demand platform and Astro GO.

Unifi TV started rebroadcasting Animax on 1 June 2017 along with Sony Channel. They initially ceased its transmission of the channel on 1 July 2020, but would resume on 1 October 2021 along with introduction of AXN & GEM, two other channels owned by KC Global Media Asia.

On April 24, 2023, Animax relaunched in Malaysia via tonton alongside its sister channel GEM.

=== South Asia ===
==== India ====
On 18 April 2017, Animax India ceased broadcasting in India, with Sony Yay ultimately replacing the network. Sony would later make the Asian feed of Animax available on its Indian digital platform, Sony LIV, until 8 May 2020, when several Sony-owned networks were acquired by KC earlier that week.

On 20 January 2023, Animax Asia started broadcasting in India exclusively via the streaming platform, JioTV. Animax would also become available on Amazon Prime Video, along with sibling brand GEM, that same year.

Animax became available for streaming on Tata Play from 8 February 2024. An Animax-branded FAST channel was launched on Samsung TV Plus in April 2024.

==== Maldives ====
In Maldives, Animax Asia began its availability on MediaNet in 2005, halted its broadcast in 2016 and resumed its broadcast in 2022.

==== Sri Lanka ====
On 30 June 2023, Animax expanded its reach to Sri Lanka via an exclusive partnership with Dialog Television, a satellite TV company based in Sri Lanka under the Axiata conglomerate.

== See also ==
- List of programs broadcast by Animax
- Animax (India)
- Animax (Taiwan)
