= Changi Business Park =

Business park in East Region, Singapore

Coordinates: 01°20′05.9″N 103°57′54.6″E

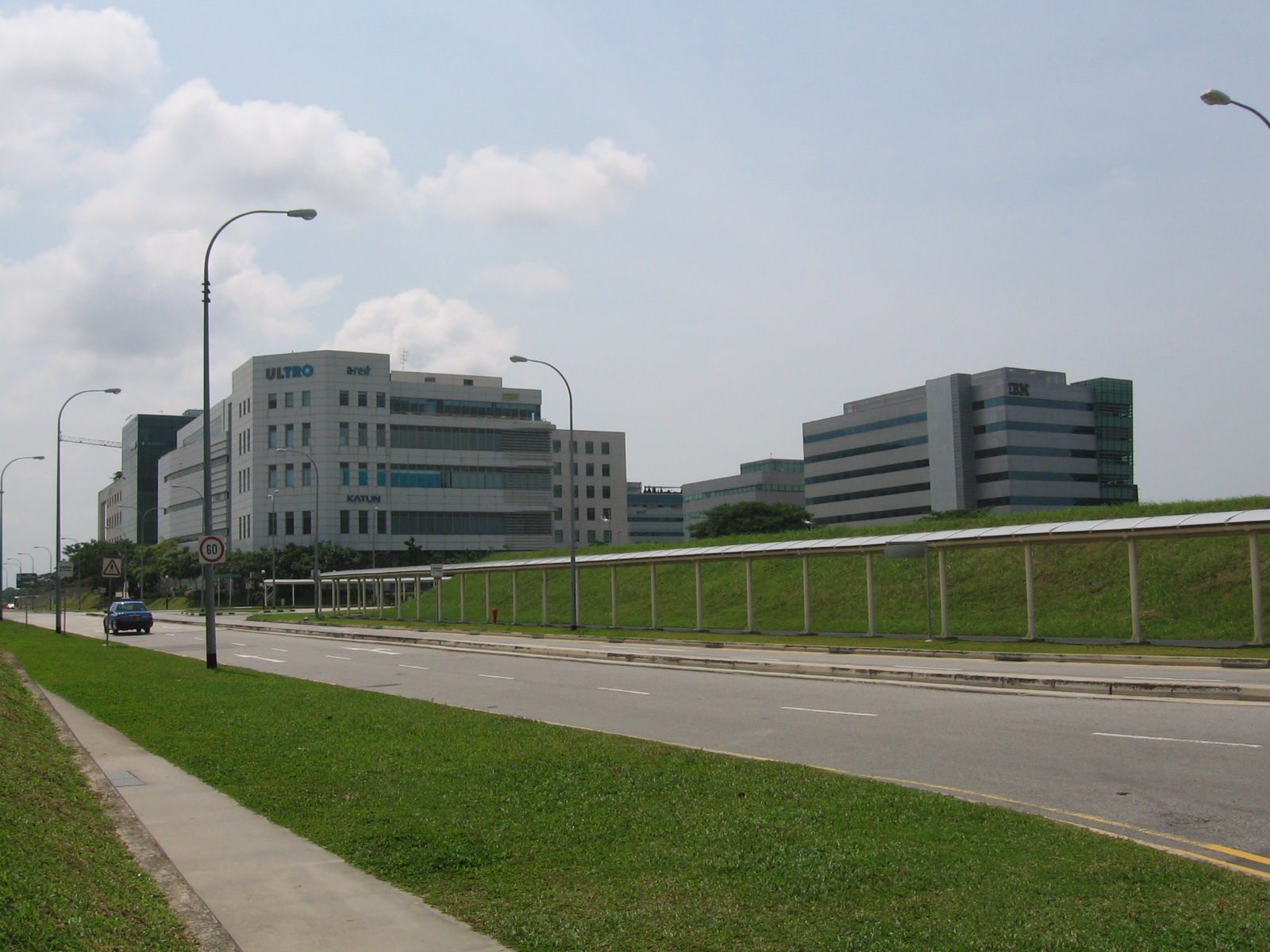
- Changi Business Park

- Location within Singapore
- Location: Changi, Singapore
- Opening date: July 1997; 29 years ago
- Developer: Ascendas Land (Singapore) Pte Ltd; Frasers Centrepoint Limited
- Owner: JTC Corporation
- Size: 71.07 ha (175.6 acres)

The Changi Business Park (Note: (Malay: Taman Perniagaan Changi; Chinese: 樟宜商业园; Tamil: சாங்கி பிஸினஸ் பார்க்)) (CBP) is a business park located in Changi South, in the eastern part of Singapore.

== Launch ==
In 1992, JTC Corporation had plans to make a second business park in Changi South with the first 12-hectares being completed in 1995.

Launched in July 1997, the 66-hectare or Changi Business Park is JTC Corporation's second business park following the International Business Park in Jurong East. The Changi Business Park comprises a mix of high technology business, data and software enterprises, research and development divisions, and knowledge intensive facilities.

The Changi Business Park is located near to Changi Airport, the Aviation Distri-Zone and logistics facilities. This simplifies transportation and logistics arrangements for businesses leading to significant cost savings.

The business park is also close to Singapore Expo, one of South East Asia’s largest exhibition centres and easily accessible to the Central Business District by rail via the Expo MRT station and Xilin MRT station, and by road via the Pan Island Expressway and the East Coast Parkway.

Completed in 2012, a large area of 71.07-hectare Changi Business Park would open as a mixed-use development project. Comprising a retail shopping mall, office building, and hotel building, the project was redeveloped by a joint venture between Ascendas Land and Frasers Centrepoint. Construction of the project was undertaken by Japanese general construction contractor Nakano Corporation.

Investors can lease land sites from JTC Corporation to construct their facilities.

== Accessing CBP ==
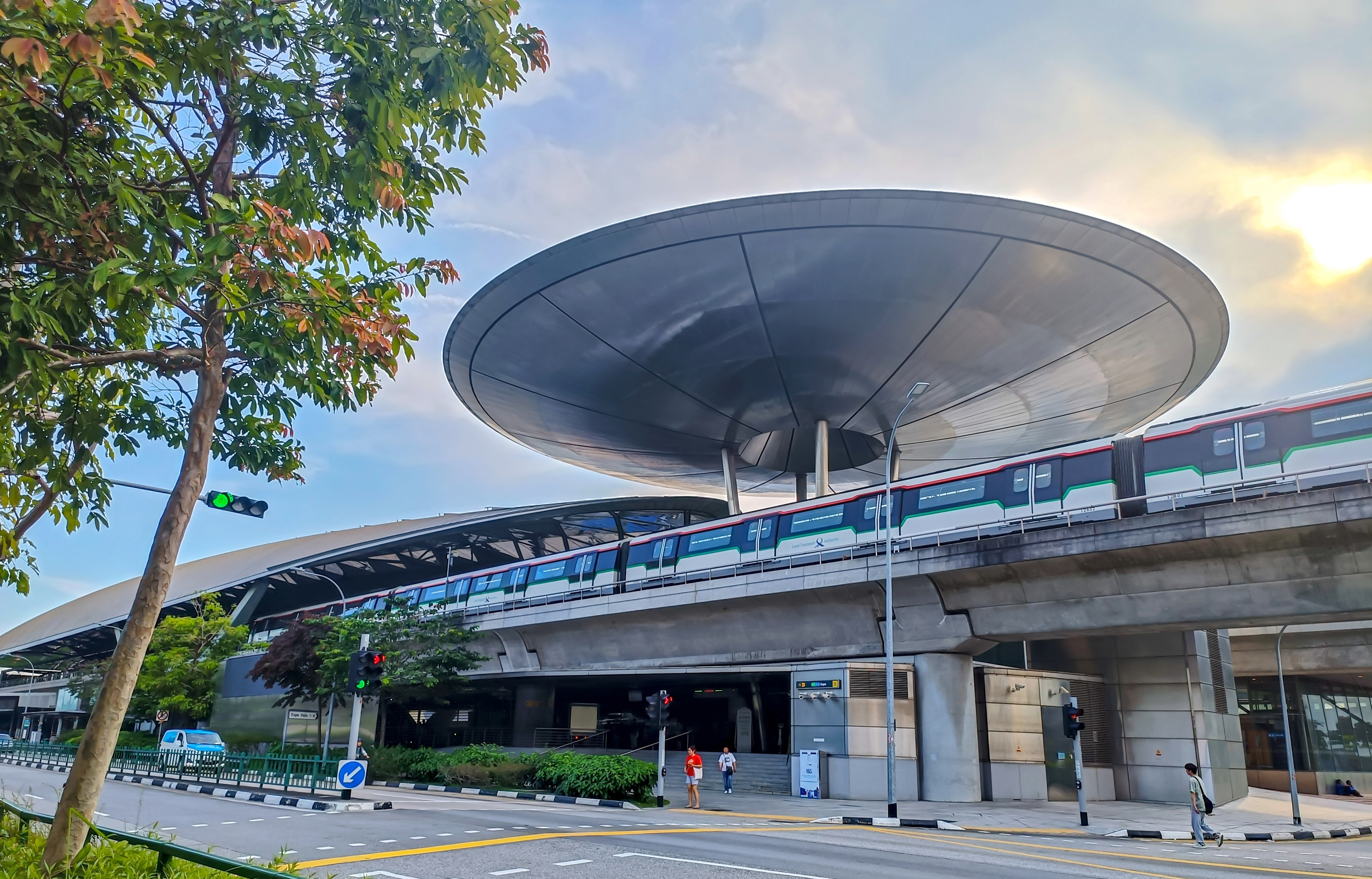
Expo station

=== Rail ===
Changi Business Park is served by Expo MRT station, and on December 26, 2026 by Xilin MRT station.

=== Bus ===
Changi Business Park can be accessed via an on-demand, free shuttle service from Changi Airport. Two other paid-for bus services terminate at the bus terminal: route 47 from Marine Parade (looping back at Amber Road) and route 118 from Punggol, route 35 running along Xilin Avenue which is less than a minute walk via a small pedestrian pathway to Changi South Street 3, while route 20 loops within the area.

==== Changi Business Park Bus Terminal ====
Changi Business Park Bus Terminal is a bus terminal located in the north of Changi Business Park in the eastern part of Singapore. The terminal is located adjacent to the Singapore University of Technology & Design campus in Changi South. Construction of the terminal started in 2014 and was subsequently completed the year after.
