= List of television stations in Romania =

The following is a list of television channels broadcast in Romania.

== National ==
=== State-owned ===
TVR – Televiziunea Română

- TVR 1 (HD) – general
- TVR 2 (HD) – general
- TVR 3 (HD) – general
- TVR Cultural (HD) – cultural
- TVR Info (HD) – news
- TVR Internațional (HD) – international
- TVR Moldova (HD) – general (TVR for Moldova)
- TVR Sport (HD) – sports

=== Private ===
CME

- Acasă (HD) – general (formally feminine public)
- Acasă Gold (HD) – movies
- PRO Arena (HD) – sports and male-oriented programming
- PRO Cinema (HD) – movies
- PRO TV (HD) – general
- PRO TV Chișinău – general
- PRO TV Internațional – international

Intact

- Antena 1 (HD) – general
- Antena 3 CNN (HD) – news
- Antena Internațional (HD) – international
- Antena Stars (HD) – entertainment
- Happy Channel (HD) – feminine public
- Chefi.ro (HD) – gastronomy

Doğan Media International SA

- Kanal D (HD) – general
- Kanal D2 (HD) – general

Clever Group

- Agro TV – agriculture
- Cinemaraton (HD) – Romanian movies
- Cinemaraton Plus (HD) – Romanian movies
- Cinemaraton Moldova (HD) – Romanian movies
- Medika TV – wellness
- Nostalgia TV – movies
- Prima Comedy (HD) – comedy
- Prima History – history and documentary
- Prima News (HD) – news
- Prima Sport 1 (HD) – sports
- Prima Sport 2 (HD) – sports
- Prima Sport 3 (HD) – sports
- Prima Sport 4 (HD) – sports
- Prima Sport 5 (HD) – sports
- Prima Sport PPV 1 (HD) – sports
- Prima Sport PPV 2 (HD) – sports
- Prima Sport PPV 3 (HD) – sports
- Prima Sport PPV 4 (HD) – sports
- Prima TV (HD) – general
- Prima TV Moldova (HD) – general
- Prima World – gastronomy

CNM

- Favorit TV – folk music
- Favorit TV 2 – folk music
- Național 24 Plus – infotainment
- Național TV – general
- Național TV 2 – general

Best Media Mix SRL

- Party Mix (HD) – music
- Travel Mix (HD) – tourism

Atomic Media Advertising SRL

- Atomic TV – music
- Atomic Academy – music

Etno Folclor Media SRL

- Etno TV (HD) – general
- Taraf TV (HD) – manele

Other TV channels

- Aleph Business – news
- Aleph News – news
- Alfa Omega TV – religious
- Angelus TV – religious
- B1 TV – news (formally general and infotainment)
- Boom TV – music
- Credo TV – religious
- Etno TV (HD) – folk music
- Euronews Romania – news
- Exploris – general
- Inedit TV – general
- Kapital TV – general
- Maria TV – religious
- Nașul TV – news
- NCN – news
- OTV – news
- Realitatea Plus – news
- România TV – news
- Sens TV (HD) – architecture and design
- Speranța TV – religious
- Smart TV – news
- Taraf TV (HD) – music
- Top Shop TV – teleshopping
- Trinitas TV – religious
- Zoom TV – general

== Satellite and cable ==
Digi Communications

- Digi 24 (HD) – news
- Digi Animal World (HD) – documentaries
- Digi Life (HD) – lifestyle
- Digi Sport 1 (HD) – sport
- Digi Sport 2 (HD) – sport
- Digi Sport 3 (HD) – sport
- Digi Sport 4 (HD) – sport
- Digi World (HD) – documentaries
- Film Now (HD) – movies
- HIT Music Channel (HD) – music
- Hora TV (HD) – ethnic culture
- Music Channel (HD) – music
- U TV (HD) – music

CME

- Voyo Sport 1 (HD) – sports

Skydance Romania

- Animal Planet Europe (HD) – documentaries
- Cartoon Network – cartoons
- Cartoonito – cartoons
- Cinemax (HD) – movies
- Cinemax 2 (HD) – movies
- Comedy Central – series
- CNN International – news
- Discovery Channel (HD) – documentaries
- Eurosport 1 (HD) – sports
- Eurosport 2 (HD) – sports
- Food Network (HD) – gastronomy
- HBO (HD) – movies
- HBO 2 (HD) – movies
- HBO 3 (HD) – movies
- HGTV – gardener
- Investigation Discovery (HD) – investigations
- MTV Global – entertainment
- Nick Jr. Channel – cartoons
- Nickelodeon (HD) – cartoons
- Nicktoons – cartoons
- TLC (HD) – life
- Warner TV (HD) – movies

Antenna Group

- AXN (HD) – series
- AXN Black – series
- AXN Spin – series
- AXN White – series
- Kiss TV (HD) – music
- Magic TV (HD) – oldies
- Rock TV (HD) – rock music

AMC Networks International

- AMC (HD) – movies
- Extreme Sports Channel – sports
- Film Cafe (HD) – movies
- Film Mania (HD) – movies
- JimJam – cartoons
- Minimax – cartoons
- TV Paprika (HD) – gastronomy

Disney Entertainment Television

- Baby TV – cartoons
- National Geographic Channel (HD) – documentaries
- Nat Geo People (HD) – documentaries
- National Geographic Wild (HD) – documentaries
- Disney Channel – teenagers
- Disney Jr. – cartoons

Viasat Romania

- Viasat Epic Drama (HD) – series
- Viasat Kino – movies
- Viasat Explore (HD) – documentaries
- Viasat History (HD) – history
- Viasat Nature (HD) – documentaries

BBC Studios

- BBC News – news
- BBC Earth (HD) – documentaries
- BBC First (HD) – series

Tematic Media Group

- The Fishing & Hunting Channel (HD) – fishing and hunting

NBCUniversal

- DIVA – movies
- E! Entertainment (HD) – entertainment

A&E Television Networks

- Crime + Investigation – investigations
- History (HD) – history

ISG Media

- Asia TV - Asian movies
- Bollywood Classic – movies
- Bollywood Film – movies
- CineWow – Romanian movies

Kino Polska

- DocuBox – documentary
- Erox – erotic
- Eroxxx – erotic
- FashionBox – fashion
- Fast&FunBox – sports
- FilmBox+ One – movies
- FilmBox+ Festival – movies
- FilmBox+ Emotion – movies
- FilmBox+ Comedy – movies
- FilmBox+ Hits – movies
- FightBox – sports
- GameToon – entertainment
- Timeless Drama Channel – movies

Mooz TV

- Mooz Dance – music
- Mooz Hits – music
- Mooz RO – music
- Sport Extra – sports

Orange Romania

- Orange Info – general

SkyShowtime

- SkyShowtime 1 (HD) – movies
- SkyShowtime 2 (HD) – movies

Others

- Al Jazeera – news
- Arte – news
- Auto Motor und Sport Channel (HD) – sports
- Balkanika MTV – music from the Balkans (balkanika music television)
- Bloomberg – news
- CGTN – news
- Da Vinci Learning – children's education
- Deutsche Welle – news
- Duna TV – general
- Duck TV (HD) – cartoons
- Fashion TV – fashion
- France 24 – news
- KBS World – general
- Mezzo – music
- Motorvision – sports
- Myzen.tv – entertainment
- Nautical Channel – entertainment
- ProSieben – general
- Rai 1 – general
- Rai 3 – general
- Russia Today – news
- RTL – general
- Sat.1 – general
- Shorts TV – entertainment
- Trace Sport Stars (HD) – sports
- TV5Monde Europe – general

== Internet streaming ==
=== State-owned ===
TVR – Televiziunea Română

- TVR Folclor (HD) – folk music

== Local ==
=== State-owned ===
TVR – Televiziunea Română

- TVR Cluj – regional
- TVR Craiova – regional
- TVR Iași – regional
- TVR Timișoara – regional
- TVR Tîrgu-Mureș – regional

== Closed TV channels ==
2004

- FOX Kids (now Disney Channel Romania)
- FOX Kids Play (now Disney Junior Romania)

2006

- TV K Lumea (now Kiss TV)

2007

- TV Sport (now Pro Arena)
- A+ Anime

2009

- Info Dolce
- Jetix (now Disney Channel Romania)

2010

- Cosmos TV
- Hallmark Channel (now Diva)
- MTV Two
- Boom Sport (now Orange Sport)

2011

- Vox News
- Telesport
- Playhouse Disney (now Disney Junior Romania)
- Digi Sport (now Digi Sport)
- Digi Sport HD (now Digi Sport 1 HD)
- Digi Sport Plus (now Digi Sport 2)

2012

- CineStar
- ActionStar
- ComedyStar
- 10 TV (now Digi24)
- Sport Klub
- Romantica (now Film Cafe)

2013

- Discovery Travel & Living (now TLC)
- TVH 2.0
- Money.ro TV
- AXN Crime (now AXN White)
- AXN Sci Fi (now AXN Black)
- Antena 2 (now Antena Stars)
- KidsCo

2014

- DDTV
- Animax (Closed in 2014)
- GSP TV (now Chefi.ro)
- Giga TV
- MGM (now AMC)

2015

- Mynele TV
- The Money Channel
- Universal Channel
- TVR News
- TCM (now Warner TV)
- Eurosport
- C8

2016

- HBO Comedy (now HBO 3)
- Comedy Central Extra (now Comedy Central Romania)
- Euforia TV (now Happy Channel)

2017

- Discovery World
- ShortsTV
- Sport.ro (now Pro Arena)
- Dolce Info (now Orange Info)
- Dolce Sport (now Orange Sport)

2018

- Digi Film (now Film Now)
- Look Plus (now Prima Sport 1)

2019

- MTV Romania
- TVH Kids Channel
- Nat Geo Wild (now National Geographic Wild)
- Realitatea TV
- TVR HD

2020

- Megamax
- Neptun TV
- MTV Dance (now Club MTV)
- MTV Rocks (now MTV 90s)
- VH1 Classic (now MTV 80s)
- Discovery HD Showcase
- Fine Living
- Televiziunea Târgu-Mureș

2021

- Paramount Channel (now TeenNick)
- VH1 Europe (now MTV 00s)
- TNT (now Warner TV)

2022

- Comedy Est (now Prima History)
- PRO 2 (now Acasă)
- PRO X (now Pro Arena)
- PRO Gold (now Acasă Gold)
- Look Sport (now Prima Sport)
- Telekom Info (now Orange Info)
- Telekom Sport (now Orange Sport)
- Antena 3 (now Antena 3 CNN)

2023

- Boomerang (now Cartoonito)
- București TV (now Kanal D2)
- Cinema Est (now Prima History)
- Discovery Science
- DTX (TV channel)

2024

- Arcadia TV World (now Prima World)
- Orange Sport

2025

- Linkpress TV
- Global News
- Melos TV
- Travel Channel
- Money News
- Profit News
- Apollonia TV
- MTV Hits
- Club MTV
- MTV 00s
- MTV 80s
- MTV 90s
- MTV Live

2026

- CBS Reality
- TeenNick
- Telestar 1
- Canal 33
- Cinethronix
- FilmBox
- FilmBox Arthouse
- FilmBox Extra
- FilmBox Family
- FilmBox Premium
- ZU TV (now Chefi.ro)

Other

- A+
- Absolut TV
- Alpha TV
- AKTA Info
- Antena News
- Antena TV Novela
- Bah TV
- BBC Prime
- BBC Entertainment
- Boom Action
- Boom Base
- Boom Cinema 1
- Boom Cinema 2
- Boom Comedy
- Boom Classic
- Boom Drama
- Boom Hop!
- Boom Indian
- Boom Karaoke
- Boom KidZone
- Boom Music
- Boom Public
- Boom Romance
- Boom Secrets
- Boom Smarty
- Boom Sport
- Boom Sport One
- Boom Sport Two
- Boom Sport Three
- Boom Sport Four
- Brava TV
- Canal 1
- Canal M
- Canal Teleshop
- Cherry Music
- CMT
- Da Vinci
- Diaspora TV
- Digi Film 2
- Digi Info
- Digi Premium
- DoQ
- ESPN America
- ESPN Classic
- Eurochannel
- Eurosport 3
- Eurosport 4
- Eurosport 5
- Eurosport 3D
- F+
- Flux TV
- GoodLife Channel
- GSP TV 2
- GSP TV 3
- GSP TV 4
- Guide Channel
- IDA TV
- Interac TV
- Light Channel
- Magic Action
- Magic Box
- Magic Classic
- Magic PPV 1
- Magic PPV 2
- Magic PPV 3
- Magic PPV 4
- Magic Promo
- Magic X
- Meteo TV
- Mooz 4K
- Mooz HD
- Motorsport.tv
- Movies 24
- MusicMix
- MusiKlub
- News Romania
- Noll TV
- One TV
- Orion
- Outdoor Channel
- Partener TV
- Party TV
- Pax TV
- Pratech TV
- Pro TV Brașov
- Pro TV Arad
- Pro TV Buzău
- Pro TV Constanța
- Pro TV Iași
- Pro TV Oradea
- Pro TV Satu Mare
- Pro TV Tg. Mureș
- PV TV
- Romance TV
- România Ta
- Senso
- Sci Fi
- Spark
- Sport1 RO
- SportKlub+
- Sport Klub Prime
- Stingray
- Style Network
- Sundance TV
- Tele7ABC
- Teleshop 24
- The Medical Channel
- Top 1 TV
- Tradiții TV
- TTV
- TV OK
- TVR București
- TVRM Cultural
- UTV 3D
- Vacanța TV
- Voyo Action
- Voyo Cinema
- Voyo Comedy
- Zeus TV
- Zone Reality

== See also ==
- Television in Romania
