= List of Hungarian-language television channels =

This is a list of Hungarian-language television channels.

== Romania ==
=== State ===
- TVR1 – partially in Hungarian
- TVR Cultural – partially in Hungarian
- TVR 3 Cluj – partially in Hungarian
- TVR 3 Timişoara – partially in Hungarian

=== Private ===
- Erdély TV
- TVR Târgu Mureș – 50% in Hungarian

== Serbia ==
=== State ===
- RTV2 – 50% in Hungarian

== See also ==
- Lists of television channels
- Media of Hungary
