= Telejurnal (Romanian TV program) =

- Genre: News programme
- Presented by: Mihai Rădulescu (19:00); Eugen Rusu (23:00); Laura Fronoiu (Matinal); Marius Popa (Matinal); Andra Soceanu (14:00); Loredana Iordache (14:00); Cristian Petru (12:00)
- Country of origin: Romania
- Original language: Romanian

Production
- Producers: Diana Anghel; Dorin Munteanu; Anamaria Panait; Delia Nicola; Andreea Vișan; Elena Hebean; Razvan Tiniche
- Camera setup: Multi-camera
- Running time: 50 minutes

Original release
- Network: TVR (TVR1, TVR2, and TVRi)
- Release: 1958

Related
- Ora de știri

Telejurnalul is the main news program of the Romanian public television network TVR, broadcast daily on TVR1, at 14:00, 19:00 & 23:00

It broadcasts at different hours on TVR1 and TVR2, if sporting events that the two channels broadcast interfere with their usual TV schedules.

Between 2015 and 2016, two ident changes occurred. On 14 September 2015, on the 20:00 edition, Telejurnal unveiled its new logo, graphics, and tickerbar which shows every top story. And in October 2016, it adopted a freshly, redesigned blue-red-white graphics package.

On 3 November 2019, Telejurnal launched a new look at the same time when the HD simulcasts of TVR 1 and TVR 2 were launched. On 24 November 2019, TVR Moldova started adopting the 2019 Telejurnal look, while on 6 January 2020, TVR 3 and 6 other TVR regional channels started adopting the 2019 Telejurnal look with that change.

On 22 June 2022, to coincide the launch of TVR Info, Telejurnal unveiled a new graphics package and started reusing the 2012-2019 theme.

Telejurnal has been found to have its highest viewership in the winter months.
