= TVR News =

- Country: Romania

Programming
- Language(s): Romanian language
- Picture format: 4:3 (576i SDTV)

Ownership
- Owner: Televiziunea Română
- Sister channels: TVR 1, TVR 2, TVR 3, TVR Cultural, TVRi, TVR HD

History
- Launched: 15 November 2012
- Closed: 1 August 2015

Links
- Website: http://www.tvrnews.ro

TVR News was a Romanian TV channel that belonged to Romanian Television, the public TV broadcaster. Its programs were in collaboration with the European news channel Euronews.

TVR News was formerly known as TVR Info, a TV channel which stopped broadcasting following the economical recovery measures of the Public Television. Three months after its broadcast was suspended, the Public Television signed an agreement with the pan-European news channel Euronews. Following the signing, the TV channel relaunched under a new name: TVR News.

The channel was airing utility info, such as traffic news and weather, sport and news casts, feature-reports etc. However the news broadcasts can be received only by viewers on the territory of Romania.

On July 21, 2015, it was announced that TVR News would shut down effective August 1, due to accumulated debts. Its limited content was handed over to other TVR channels.
