= TVR Iași =

- Country: Romania
- Broadcast area: Bacău, Botoșani, Galați, Iași, Neamț, Suceava, Vaslui, Vrancea
- Headquarters: Iași

Programming
- Picture format: 16:9

Ownership
- Owner: Televiziunea Română

History
- Launched: 3 November 1991

Links
- Website: http://www.tvriasi.ro

Availability

Terrestrial
- Televiziunea Română: DVB-T2, MUX1, SNR-Radiocom

Streaming media
- http://media.tvriasi.ro, rtmp://82.208.151.107:1935/tvriasi/live

TVR Iași is one of the six regional stations of TVR - the Romanian National Television Station. Its headquarters are in Iași. TVR Iași programmes are broadcast in the Moldova Region of Romania, covering all eight departments in the north-eastern part of the country. The station broadcasts daily and produces programmes for the national (TVR 1, TVR 2, TVR 3, TVR Info, TVR Cultural) and international Romanian public channels (TVR International & TVR Moldova). Its first broadcast was on 3 November 1991.

In 1992, the station joined CIRCOM Regional, the European Association of Regional Television Stations.
