= TVR HD =

- Country: Romania (1st national network)

Programming
- Picture format: 1080i HDTV

Ownership
- Owner: Televiziunea Română
- Sister channels: TVR1, TVR2, TVR3, TVR Cultural, TVR Info, TVRi

History
- Launched: 1 June 2008
- Closed: 3 November 2019; 6 years ago

TVR HD (Romanian pronunciation: [ˌtevere haʃˈde]) was a Romanian free-to-air high definition channel, owned by TVR, the Romanian state-owned broadcasting corporation. It broadcast programming of TVR1 and TVR2 in HD. It began test broadcasting in April 2008. It was launched the same year on the first day of June, during the children's international day.

On 3 November 2019, the channel was closed down and was replaced by TVR1 HD and TVR2 HD.
