= AXN =

Pay television channel (launched 1997)

- Country: Europe; Asia; Latin America

Programming
- Picture format: 16:9 HDTV

Ownership
- Owner: Sony Group Corporation
- Parent: Sony Pictures Television (Sony Pictures Entertainment)

History
- Launched: September 21, 1997

Links
- Website: www.axn.com

AXN is a pay television channel brand by Sony Pictures Television, which was first launched in September 1997 in Asia. Local versions have since been launched in several parts of the world, including Europe, Asia, and Latin America, with some networks operated by others and licensing the AXN branding and graphical elements from SPT.

Funded through advertising or subscription fees, AXN primarily airs action genre and reality programming.

== AXN channels ==
There are various local versions of the channel, as listed below:

=== Current channels ===
Channel	Type	Country or region	Launch date
AXN Asia	Licensed (Note: Owned by KC Global Media Asia.)	Asia/Singapore	September 21, 1997
AXN Spain	Owned	Spain/Andorra	November 5, 1998
AXN Latin America	Owned	Latin America	August 1, 1999
AXN Brazil	Owned	Brazil	August 1, 1999
AXN Portugal	Owned	Portugal	November 5, 2002
AXN CEE	Licensed (Note: Owned by Antenna Group.)	Hungary, Poland, Czech Republic, Slovakia, Romania, Bulgaria	October 17, 2003
AXN Adria	Licensed	Bosnia and Herzegovina, Croatia, North Macedonia, Montenegro, Serbia, and Slovenia	September 14, 2009

=== Former channels ===
Channel	Country or region	Launch date	Shutdown date	Replaced by
AXN Japan	Japan	June 1, 1998	October 1, 2023	Action Channel (Note: Owned by Nojima Corporation.)
AXN India	India	8 January 1999	June 30, 2020	
AXN Israel	Israel	November 16, 2000	December 2008	Hot Xtra Action
Sony AXN Germany	Germany, Austria and Switzerland	November 1, 2004	September 1, 2023	AXN Black (Note: Owned by High View Group.)
AXN Italy	Italy	October 29, 2005	February 28, 2017	
AXN South Korea	South Korea	July 2005	January 2025	NXT

== Sister channels ==
=== Current channels ===
Channel	Type	Country or region	Replaced	Launch date
AXN Black	Licensed	Central Europe (except Hungary)	AXN Sci Fi	October 1, 2013
AXN Black	Licensed	Germany, Austria and Switzerland	Sony AXN	September 1, 2023
AXN Spin	Licensed	Poland		January 11, 2012
AXN Spin	Licensed	Romania		March 1, 2013
AXN Spin	Licensed	Balkans		March 2014
AXN White	Owned	Portugal	Sony Entertainment Television	April 14, 2012
AXN White	Licensed	Central Europe (except Hungary)	AXN Crime	October 1, 2013
AXN White	Licensed	Germany, Austria and Switzerland	Sony Channel	September 1, 2023
AXN Movies	Owned	Portugal	AXN Black	February 17, 2020
AXN Movies	Owned	Spain	AXN White	May 1, 2023
AXN Crime	Licensed	Hungary	Viasat Film	September 1, 2026

=== Former channels ===
Channel	Country or region	Replaced	Launch date	Shutdown date	Replaced by
AXN Crime	Central Europe		May 29, 2006	October 1, 2013	AXN White
AXN Sci Fi	Central Europe		May 29, 2006	October 1, 2013	AXN Black
AXN Sci Fi	Russia		May 29, 2006	April 13, 2013	Sony Sci Fi
AXN Sci Fi	Italy		November 8, 2010	February 28, 2017	
AXN Beyond	Asia		January 1, 2008	April 2, 2012	BeTV
AXN Mystery	Japan		November 4, 2008	October 1, 2023	Mystery Channel
AXN Black	Portugal	Animax	May 9, 2011	February 17, 2020	AXN Movies
AXN Black	Hungary	AXN Sci Fi	October 1, 2013	October 2, 2017	Sony Movie Channel
AXN White	Spain	Sony Entertainment Television	May 7, 2012	May 1, 2023	AXN Movies
AXN White	Hungary	AXN Crime	October 1, 2013	October 2, 2017	Sony Max
AXN Movies	Canada	Hollywood Storm	September 4, 2012	November 3, 2015	00's Movies (Note: Owned by Hollywood Suite.)
AXN Ninja	South Korea		April 1, 2013	July 21, 2027	Ninja Channel (Note: Owned by KC Global Media Asia.)
