= Ora de știri =

News broadcast

- Genre: News programme
- Presented by: Stela Popa; Teodora Antonescu
- Country of origin: Romania
- Original language: Romanian

Production
- Production location: Bucharest
- Camera setup: Multi-camera
- Running time: 50 minutes

Original release
- Network: TVR 2

Related
- Telejurnal (TVR 1)

Ora de știri is the main news show broadcasting daily on TVR2 starting at 6pm. It is presented by Stela Popa and Teodora Antonescu.

In 2016, Ora de știri was moved to TVR 1's broadcasting schedule. However, the program last aired in March 2018, and Ora de știri got removed from TVR 1's broadcasting schedule. It was replaced by documentaries.

On 4 October 2021, Ora de știri revived as TVR2's news program.

Ora de știri adopted a new look on 22 June 2022, at the same time when TVR Info was launched.
