= AXN Black =

European television channel

- Broadcast area: Poland; Romania; Czech Republic; Slovakia; Bulgaria; Moldova; Germany; Former: Hungary; Portugal; Angola; Mozambique

Programming
- Picture format: 1080i HDTV

Ownership
- Owner: Sony Pictures Television
- Sister channels: AXN; AXN White; AXN Spin

History
- Launched: 9 May 2011 (Portugal, Angola and Mozambique); 1 October 2013 (Central Europe)
- Replaced: Animax (Portugal); AXN Sci Fi (Central Europe)
- Closed: 3 October 2017 (Hungary); 17 February 2020 (Portugal, Angola and Mozambique)
- Replaced by: Sony Movie Channel (Hungary); AXN Movies (Portugal, Angola and Mozambique)

Links
- Website: https://www.axnblack.com

AXN Black is a channel operated by Sony Pictures Television International Networks Europe. Its programming is basically focused on action and crime television series and movies. The channel was first launched in Portugal, Angola and Mozambique on 9 May 2011 and replaced Animax. A Central European version was launched on 1 October 2013 in Hungary, Poland, Romania, the Czech Republic, Slovakia, Bulgaria and Moldova, where it replaced AXN Sci Fi.

On 3 October 2017 the channel was replaced by Sony Movie Channel in Hungary. On 1 October 2021, Sony Pictures Television Networks sold its Central European TV portfolio to Antenna Group, and on 24 March 2022, that channel was renamed Viasat Film.

On 17 February 2020 the channel was replaced by AXN Movies in Portugal, Angola and Mozambique.

On 1 September 2023, German channel Sony AXN was renamed as AXN Black.

== Logos ==
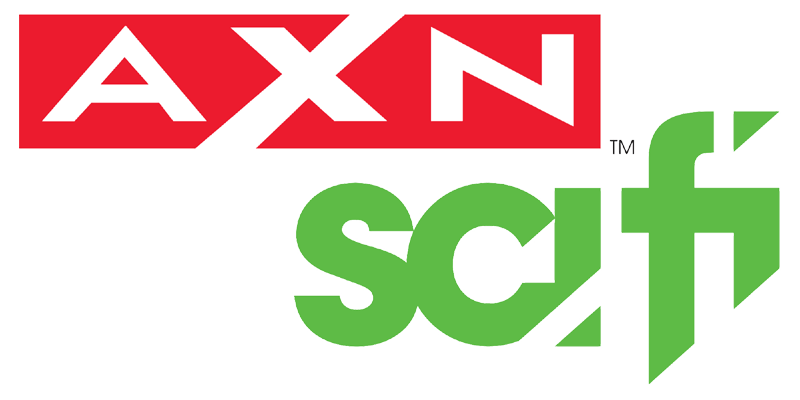
AXN Sci Fi
(2006 — 2013)

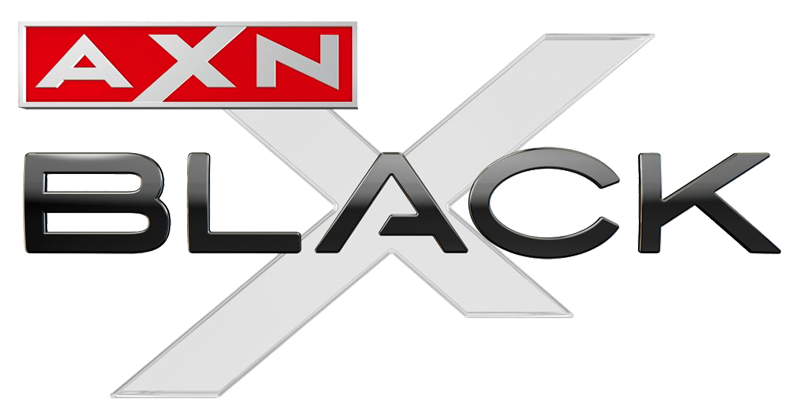
2013 — 2015

2015 — present

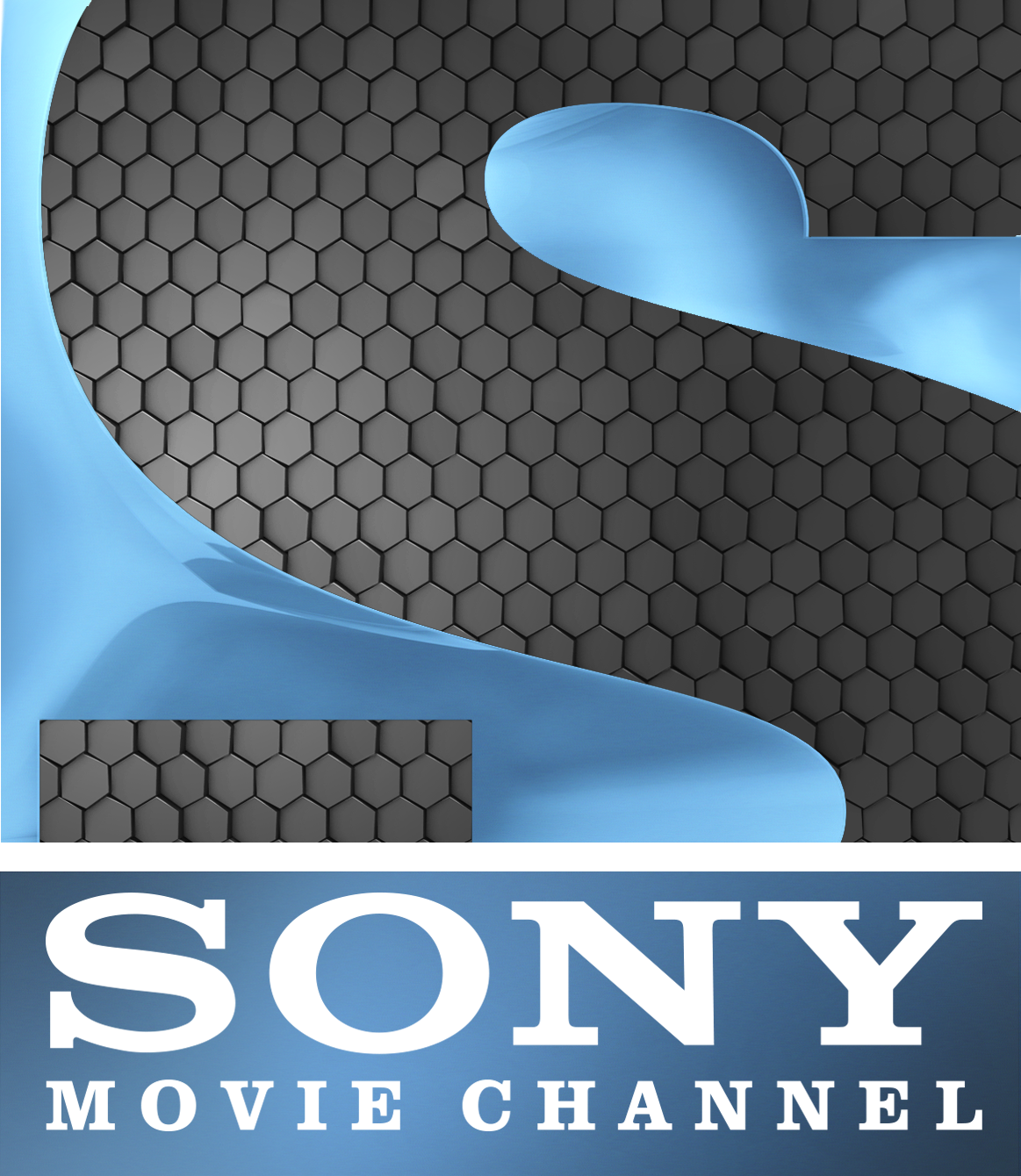
Logo rebranded as Sony Movie Channel in Hungary

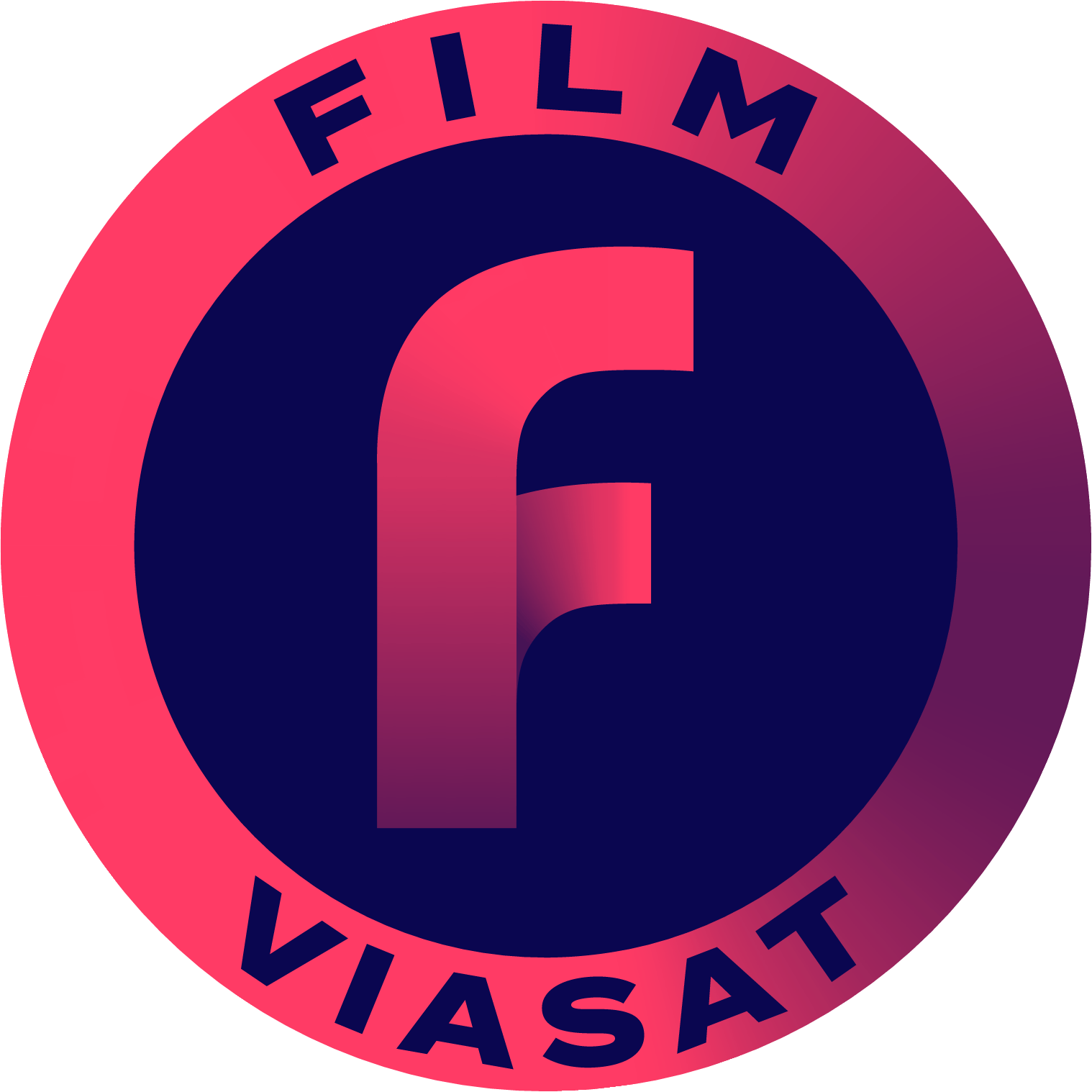
Logo renamed as Viasat Film in Hungary
