= AXN Crime =

- Country: Europe
- Broadcast area: Romania; Poland; Hungary; Bulgaria; Czech Republic; Slovakia

Programming
- Picture format: 4:3/16:9 576i (SDTV)

Ownership
- Owner: Sony Pictures Television
- Sister channels: AXN Sci Fi; AXN

History
- Launched: May 29, 2006; 20 years ago
- Closed: October 1, 2013; 13 years ago
- Replaced by: AXN White (Europe only)

Links
- Website: www.axncrime.com

Availability

Streaming media
- i-TV (Romania): Channel

AXN Crime was a European movie channel owned by Sony Pictures Television, which is broadcast eighteen hours per day, between 11:00 am and 05:00 am. It was available in Poland, Hungary, Romania and Bulgaria on Boom TV, Bulsatcom, Cyfra Plus, Cyfrowy Polsat, Digi TV, Dolce, iNES, Max TV and N. The channel was launched in the Czech Republic and Slovakia in October 2007.

On July 12, 2013, Sony announced that AXN Sci Fi and AXN Crime would be replaced by AXN Black and AXN White. On October 1, AXN Crime is replaced by AXN White.

== See also ==
- AXN
- AXN Crime Poland
- AXN Sci Fi
