= Close Up (American TV program) =

2011 American television program

- Genre: Biographical
- Created by: Ryan Smith
- Directed by: Jessie Simons
- Presented by: John Davis
- Music by: Blake Neely
- Country of origin: United States (Note: The official website says France)
- Original language: English

Production
- Producer: David Freydt
- Running time: 26 minutes
- Production company: Prime Entertainment Group

Original release
- Network: ABC Family (now Freeform)
- Release: 2011 – 2018

Close Up is a television show that tells the story, career and gossips of Hollywood stars. It debuted in 2011.

Produced by Prime Entertainment Group, the show aired on various television networks. In the United States, it aired on ABC Family (now Freeform).

== Episodes ==
=== Season 1 (2011) ===
No. overall	No. in season	Title	Original release date
1	1	"Angelina Jolie"	2011
2	2	"John Travolta"	2011
3	3	"Sharon Stone"	2011
4	4	"Kirsten Dunst"	2011
5	5	"Johnny Depp"	2011
6	6	"Halle Berry"	2011
7	7	"Denzel Washington"	2011
8	8	"Tobey Maguire"	2011
9	9	"Leonardo DiCaprio"	2011
10	10	"Charlize Theron"	2011
11	11	"Nicolas Cage"	2011
12	12	"Julia Roberts"	2011
13	13	"Keanu Reeves"	2011

=== Season 2 (2011) ===
No. overall	No. in season	Title	Original release date
14	1	"Brad Pitt"	April 1, 2011
15	2	"Jodie Foster"	April 1, 2011
16	3	"Gwyneth Paltrow"	April 1, 2011
17	4	"Cameron Diaz"	April 1, 2011
18	5	"Samuel L. Jackson"	April 1, 2011
19	6	"Ben Stiller"	April 1, 2011
20	7	"George Clooney"	April 1, 2011
21	8	"Jim Carrey"	April 1, 2011
22	9	"Tom Cruise"	April 1, 2011
23	10	"Nicole Kidman"	April 1, 2011
24	11	"Tom Hanks"	April 1, 2011
25	12	"Meryl Streep"	April 1, 2011
26	13	"Will Smith"	April 1, 2011

== Broadcast ==
The show has been licensed by many broadcasters around the world, including CANAL+ in France, AXN in Germany, AMC Networks EMEA, SABC in South Africa, Silknet in Georgia, C-More in the Nordic region, TV8 in Turkey and ABS-CBN in the Philippines. It also has been licensed by Sky New Zealand in that country. It was also licensed by Paramount International Networks in Italy.
