= TVR Cluj =

- Country: Romania
- Broadcast area: Alba, Bihor, Bistrița-Năsăud, Brașov, Cluj, Covasna, Harghita, Maramureș, Mureș, Sălaj, Sibiu

Programming
- Languages: Romanian; Hungarian
- Picture format: 16:9 (576i, SDTV)

Ownership
- Owner: Televiziunea Română

History
- Launched: 3 January 1990; 36 years ago
- Former names: RTV Tele Cluj

Links
- Website: http://cluj.tvr.ro/

Availability

Terrestrial
- Televiziunea Română: 11 counties in Transylvania

TVR Cluj is public regional TV station available in Transylvania and Maramureş.

It is the first regional branch of Societatea Română de Televiziune (Romanian Television Company), broadcasting since 3 January 1990. It is also the first one to broadcast on its own frequency, starting 15 March 2009—however it still produces programmes for the national stations, TVR1, TVR2 and is a main contributor to TVR3 together with other public regional stations. Its headquarters are in Cluj-Napoca.

TVR Cluj broadcasts primarily in the Romanian language but also in Hungarian and other national minorities' languages (German, Rroma, Hebrew, Ukrainian, etc.).
