= TVR București =

- Country: Romania
- Broadcast area: Muntenia, Dobruja

Programming
- Picture format: 4:3 (576i, SDTV)

Ownership
- Owner: Televiziunea Română

History
- Launched: 19 March 2007

Links
- Website: http://www.tvr.ro/studiouri/?id=1

Availability

Terrestrial
- Televiziunea Română: the same frequency as TVR 2

TVR București is the state-owned regional TV station available in Muntenia, broadcasting since 19 March 2007. Its headquarters are in Bucharest.
