= Brîndușa Armanca =

Romanian academic and journalist (1954–2026)

Brîndușa Armanca (27 October 1954 – 28 August 2026) was a Romanian academic and journalist. She taught journalism at the Aurel Vlaicu University of Arad, West University of Timișoara, and Lucian Blaga University of Sibiu and was the author of six books on journalism. A manager of TVR Timișoara, she was the editorial director of the Ziua daily in Bucharest, the president of Videovest Association, and board member of Transparency International Romania. From October 2006 she was the director of the Romanian Cultural Institute in Budapest, and from 2010 to 2011 held the presidency of the European Union National Institutes for Culture. In 2007 Armanca won a lawsuit against TVR for terminating her employment after disagreements about her right to free expression, after a two-year legal process. Armanca received the Cultural Award of the Romanian Academy, as well as with the Distinction of the Hungarian Ministry of Culture for cultural diplomacy.

== Early life and career ==
Brîndușa Armanca was born in Câmpulung Moldovenesc on 27 October 1954. She studied philology at the West University of Timișoara from 1973 to 1979 and obtained a PhD from the University of Bucharest in 2005. She has taught journalism at the Aurel Vlaicu University of Arad, West University of Timișoara, and Lucian Blaga University of Sibiu, and is the author of six books on journalism.

A manager of TVR Timișoara (1997–2004), a regional studio of the public television, she was the editorial director of the Ziua daily in Bucharest, the president of Videovest Association, and board member of Transparency International Romania. Armanca held many awards for TV documentaries and journalism. From October 2006 she was the director of the Romanian Cultural Institute in Budapest, and from 2010 to 2011 held the presidency of the European Union National Institutes for Culture. Armanca was a member of the Writers’ Union of Romania. Her books include writing about journalism and the media, such as Regional Television in Romania (2002), Media culpa (2006), Learn to Win (2006), and The Border-Crashers. Some of her books have been translated in Hungarian.

She received the Cultural Award of the Romanian Academy, as well as with the Distinction of the Hungarian Ministry of Culture for cultural diplomacy.

== Lawsuit against TVR ==
In August 2007, after a two-year legal battle Armanca won her lawsuit against TVR. Armanca had been fired from TVR after publicly arguing that TVR's terms of employment violated the constitution and European Convention on Human Rights. After this incident the US State Department reported that media watchdog groups had called for a reconsideration of state TV's policies which had been found to be restricting the right of its employees to freely express themselves and interfering with the public nature of the TVR as an institution. TVR were forced to rehire Armanca as a producer.

== Death ==
Armanca died in Timișoara on 28 August 2026, at the age of 71.
