= AXN White (Germany) =

German pay-TV channel owned by High View Group

- Country: Germany
- Broadcast area: Germany, Austria, Switzerland
- Headquarters: Landshut, Germany

Programming
- Language: German
- Picture format: 1080i (HDTV)

Ownership
- Owner: High View Group
- Sister channels: AXN Black

History
- Launched: 22 April 2013; 13 years ago
- Former names: Sony Entertainment Television (2013–2016); Sony Channel (2016–2023)

Links
- Website: axn.de/axn-white

AXN White (formerly Sony Channel) is a German pay cable and satellite channel owned by High View Group, based in Munich. The network was formerly wholly owned by Sony Pictures Entertainment.

== History ==
Broadcasting started at 11:11 on 22 April 2013. During its first years of broadcast, the channel was exclusively available for Deutsche Telekom until March 2016, when it became widespread among different providers such as Kabel Deutschland, Unitymedia, Kabelkiosk and Magine TV. The managing directors were John O. Fukunaga, Andrew Jay Kaplan and Karen Elisabeth Marsh, whose headquarters are in Landshut.

On December 15, 2016, the channel was renamed into Sony Channel and it later expanded its availability to Austria. On 19 September 2019, Sony Channel has adopted a new logo.

In July 2023, two Sony cable television channels were sold and managed under an independent media company, High View Group after the closing its deal. On 1 September 2023, Sony AXN and Sony Channel were renamed under the AXN branded names: AXN Black and AXN White.

== Gallery ==
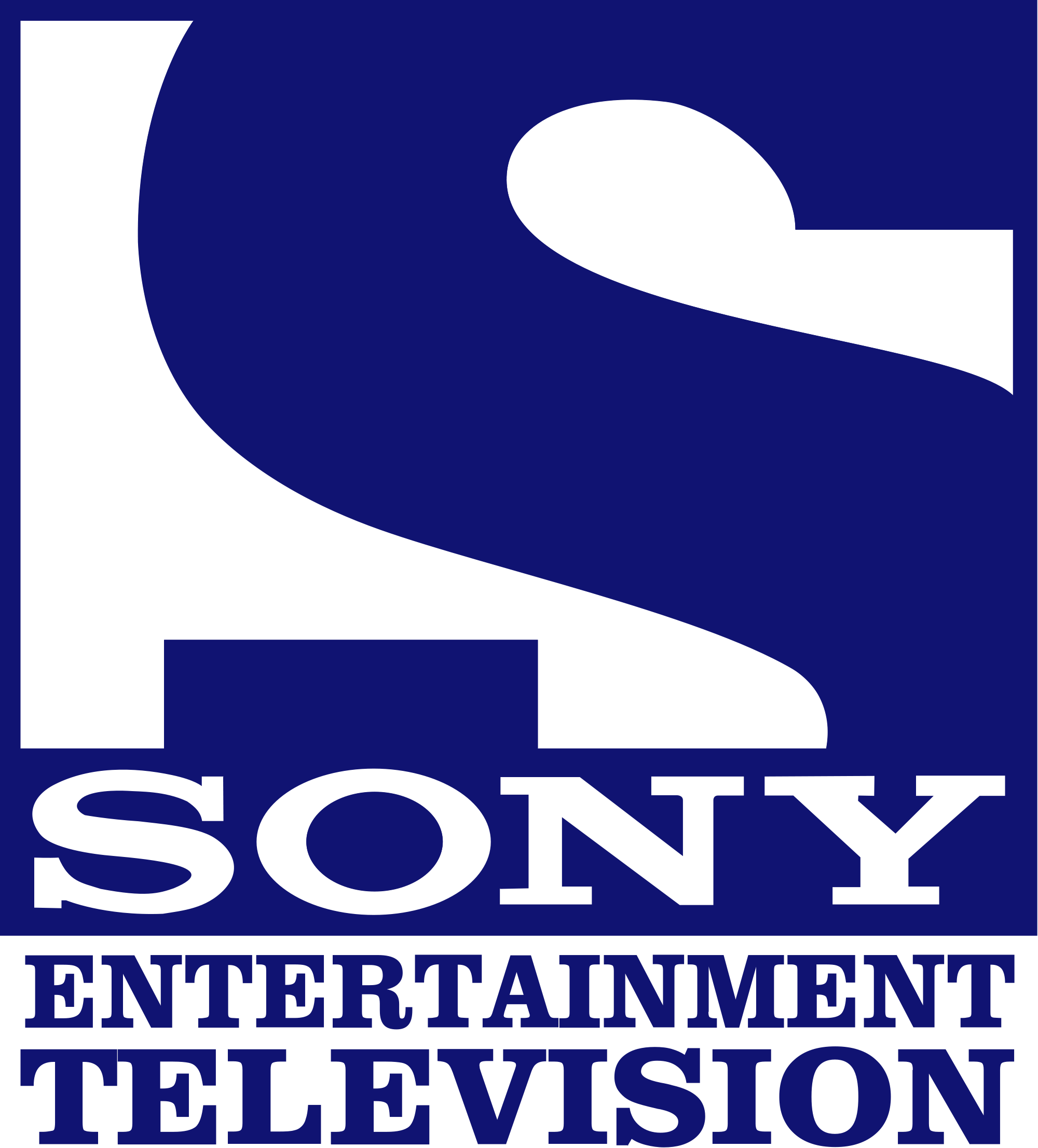
Sony Entertainment Television Logo used from 2013 to 2016

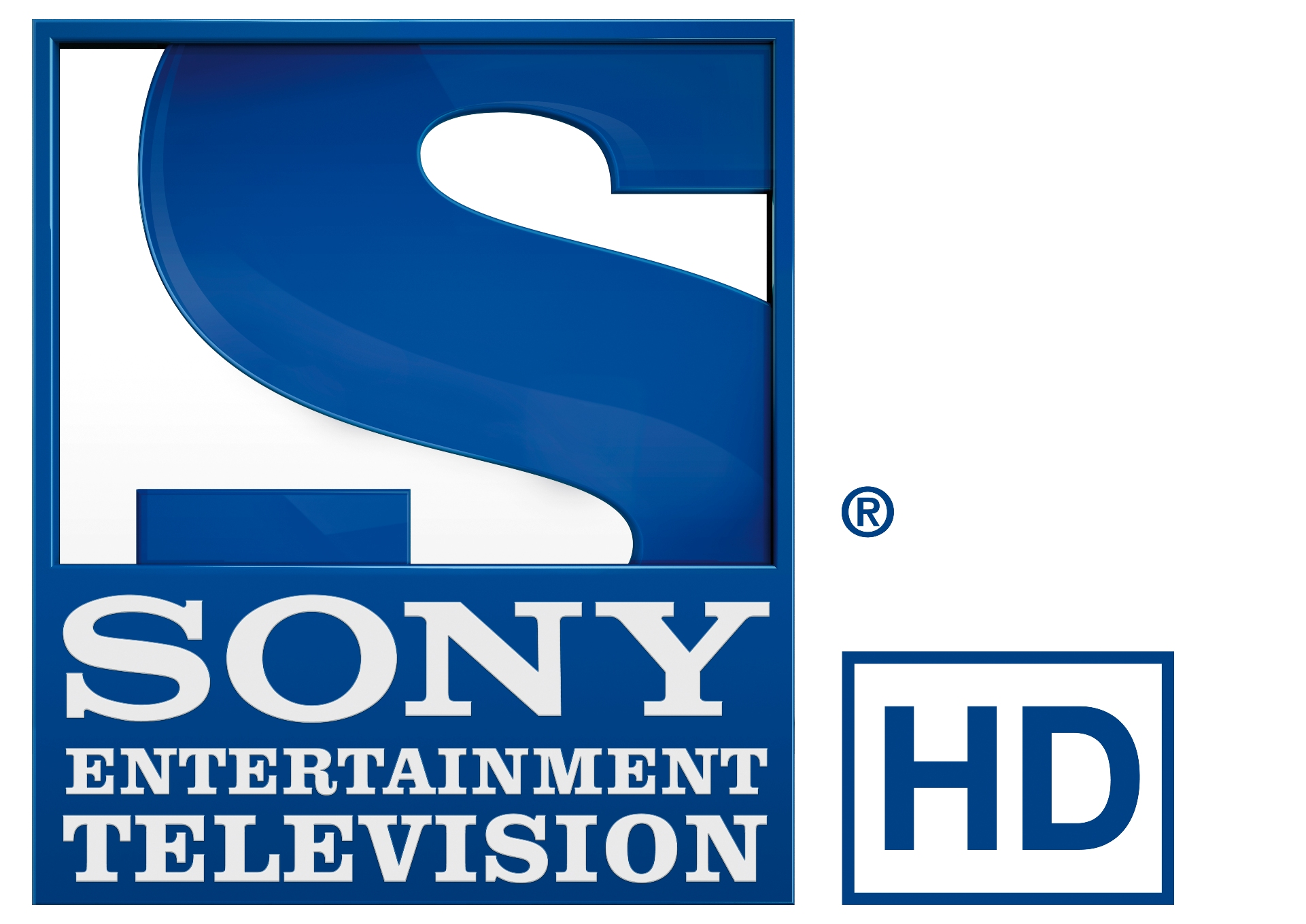
Sony Entertainment Television HD Logo used up to 2016

Sony Channel Logo used from 2016 to 2019

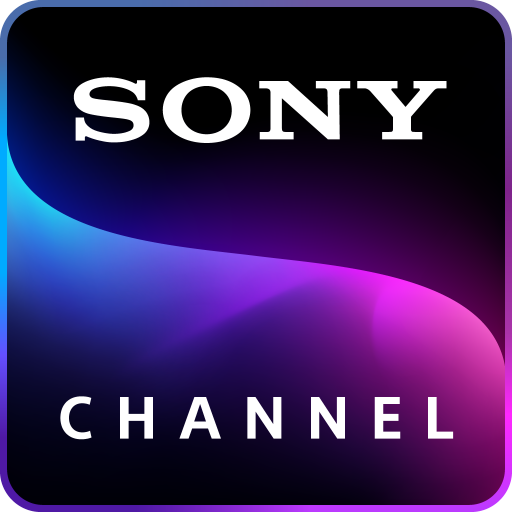
Sony Channel Logo used from 2019 to 2023

AXN White Logo used from 2023
