= AXN Movies (Portuguese TV channel) =

- Broadcast area: Portugal; Angola; Mozambique

Programming
- Picture format: Aspect Ratio: 16:9; Resolution: 576i (SD); 1080i (HD)

Ownership
- Owner: Sony Pictures Television
- Sister channels: AXN; AXN White

History
- Launched: May 9, 2011; 15 years ago
- Replaced: Animax
- Former names: AXN Black (2011-2020)

AXN Movies (previously AXN Black) is a channel operated by Sony Pictures Television International Networks Europe.

== History ==
=== As AXN Black ===
The channel was first launched in Portugal, Angola and Mozambique on May 9, 2011 as AXN Black, replacing Animax. This was the first country ever to host AXN Black.

Carlos Herrán, programming chief of AXN Black, affirmed the channel would broadcast high quality programming, unknown to the most part of audience. In fact, its programming consisted of both North American productions like Boardwalk Empire or The Vampire Diaries, and series from other countries, e.g. The Borgias, Criminal Justice, Romanzo criminale – La serie or Sherlock. It also broadcast movies every day, like The Big Lebowski, Red Eye or A.I. Artificial Intelligence.

=== As AXN Movies ===
The channel was rebranded on February 17, 2020 to AXN Movies and changed its programming, by only broadcasting movies. AXN Movies embraces all genres and aires acclaimed movies for Portuguese audience, just like Black Swan, Fargo, Juno, L.A. Confidential and Whiplash.

== Gallery ==
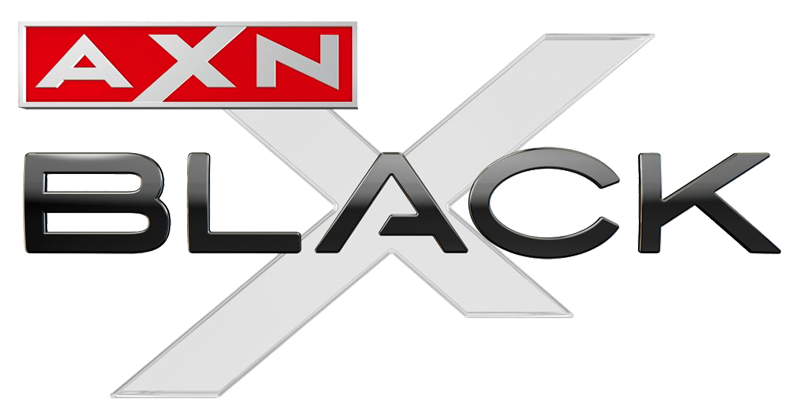
AXN Black Logo used from 2011 up to 2015

AXN Black Logo used from 2015 up to 2020

AXN Movies Logo used from 2020

== Programming ==
When the channel launched as AXN Black, it mainly aired action and crime movies and series, being primarily male focused. It also aired non-US productions. However, with the rebranding to AXN Movies, its focus was redirected to only movies.

=== Former Programming ===
Sources:

- Amber
- Band of Brothers
- Black Sails
- Boardwalk Empire
- The Borgias
- Chuck
- Code 37
- Damages
- Die Cleveren
- Five Days
- Forbidden Science
- Hannibal
- The Killing
- Little Mosque on the Prairie
- Lost Girl
- Luther
- Misfits
- The Pacific
- Reaper
- Red Widow
- Reporters
- Romanzo criminale – La serie
- Satisfaction
- Sherlock
- Supernatural
- Torchwood
- True Blood
- The Vampire Diaries
- Vidas Cruzadas
- Wallander
- Weeds
- Whitechapel
- XIII: The Series
