= TVR 3 =

- Country: Romania

Programming
- Language: Romanian
- Picture format: 576i SDTV (HD only on TVR+)

Ownership
- Owner: Televiziunea Română
- Sister channels: TVR 1 TVR 2 TVR Info; TVR Cultural; TVR Folclor; TVRi; TVR Sport

History
- Launched: October 10, 2008; 17 years ago

Links
- Website: http://tvr3.tvr.ro

Availability

Terrestrial
- Digital terrestrial television: Channel 3

TVR 3 (Romanian: TVR Trei, Romanian pronunciation: [ˌtevere ˈtrej]) is the third channel of the Romanian public broadcaster, launched on 10 October 2008.

It is a generalist channel, centered on reflecting regional events. It will use reports from all of its territorial (regional) studios (București, Cluj, Craiova, Iaşi, Târgu-Mureş, and Timişoara). The channel will not have specific time slots for all the regional studios, nor will it broadcast on a regional level. It will broadcast nationwide the same regional report.

In 2020, TVR 3 launched an HD broadcast on TVR+ in testing. It's not officially released because the other regional TVR channels are not in HD yet. It broadcasts in 720p format.

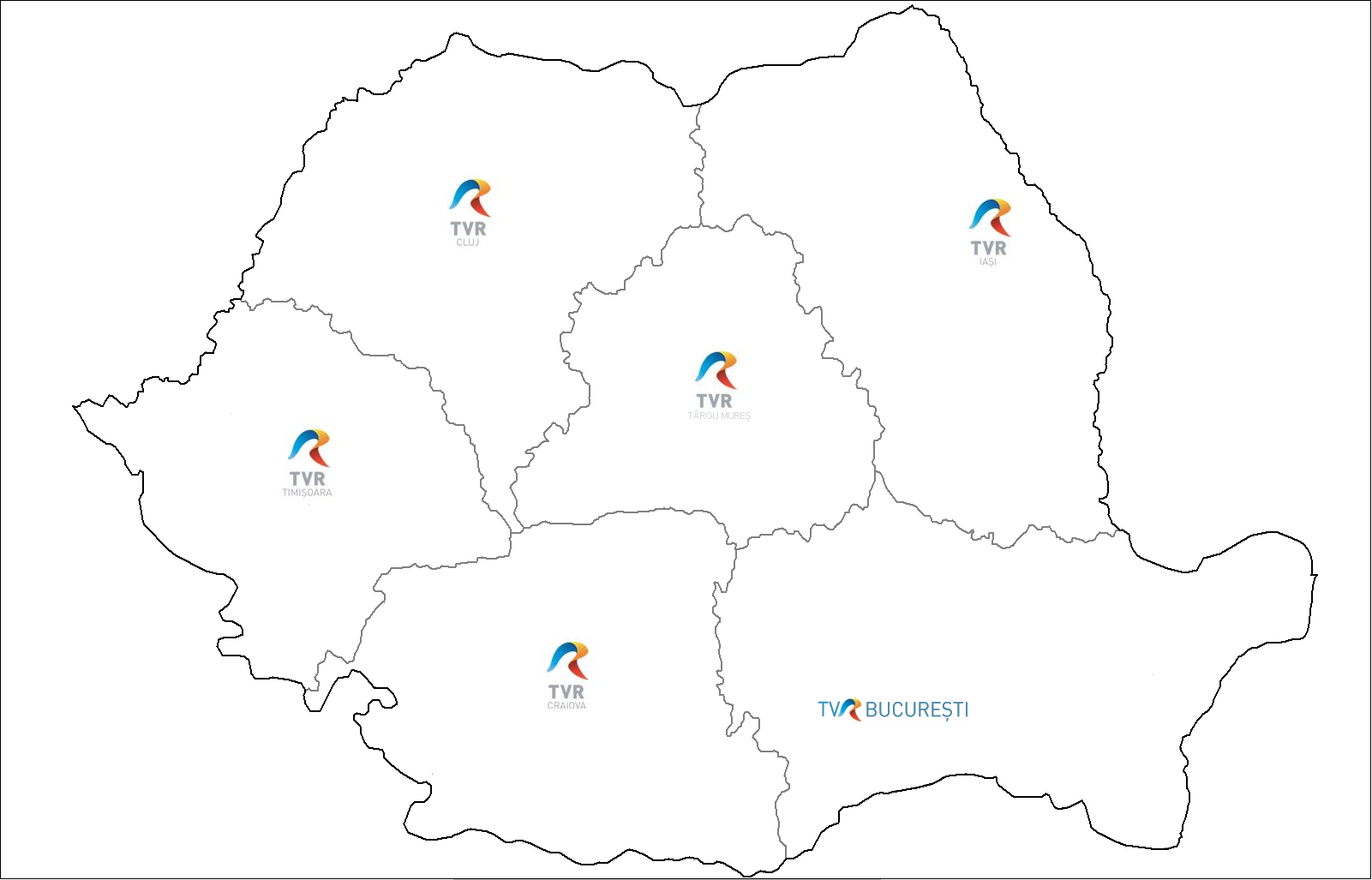
Map showing the coverage of the regional studios.

== Controversies ==
On December 5, 2013, TVR 3 aired a Christmas program ("Choose green" – Romanian: Alege verde) during which a carol was sung by the "Dor Transilvan" Ensemble, featuring antisemitic lyrics such as "She bore a beautiful son/ Namely Jesus Christ/ Everybody bows to Him/ Only the yids mock Him/ Damn yid/ The Holy God may not stand him/ Neither in heaven nor on earth/ Only in the chimney in the smoke/ There the yid is good/ To come out as smoke onto the road".

In a statement, TVR3 distanced itself from the broadcast, saying it did not select the carol but only broadcast songs that were chosen and compiled by Center for Preservation and Promotion of Traditional Culture (subordinated to the Cluj County Council), and that the respective carol belonged to the traditional archaic folklore. Eventually the artistic director of the "Dor Transilvan" Ensemble resigned at the request of the president of the Cluj County Council, nevertheless declaring that "there are no anti-Semitic carols".
