= AXN Sci Fi =

- Country: Russian Federation (CIS)
- Broadcast area: Russia; Belarus; Central Asia; Ukraine

Programming
- Picture format: 16:9 (576i, HDTV)

Ownership
- Owner: Sony Pictures Television
- Sister channels: AXN Crime; AXN; BeTV (Southeast Asia)

History
- Launched: 29 May 2006; 20 years ago (Russia, Ukraine and Kazakhstan)
- Closed: 1 October 2013; 13 years ago (Central and Eastern Europe); 28 February 2017; 9 years ago (Italy)
- Replaced by: Sony Sci Fi

Links
- Website: axnscifi.com

AXN Sci-Fi was a European pay television channel owned by Sony Pictures Television. It was available in Russia, Kazakhstan, Uzbekistan, Ukraine, Kyrgyzstan, Tajikistan and Turkmenistan.

On 13 April 2013, AXN Sci-Fi Russia changed its name to Sony Sci-Fi.

On 11 July, Sony announced that AXN Sci Fi and AXN Crime would be replaced by AXN Black and AXN White.

On 1 October, AXN Sci Fi was replaced by AXN Black, however Italy edition was unaffected.

On 28 February 2017, the channel was discontinued in Italy, together with AXN Putting an End to the "Sci-Fi" Branding, After 11 years of Broadcasting.

== Logos ==
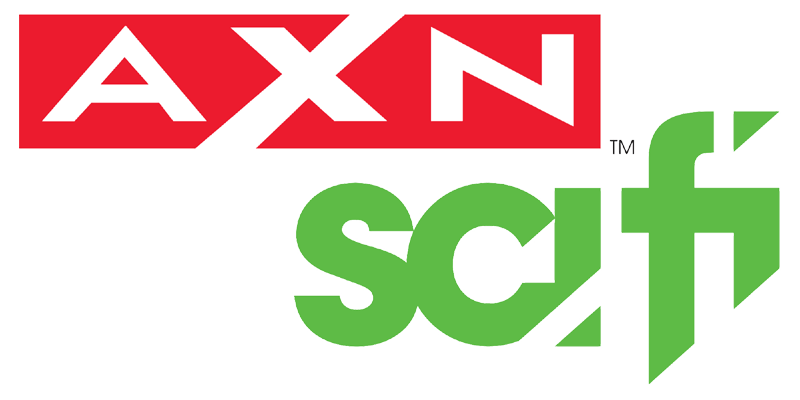
2006 — 2015

2015 — 2017

Horizontal logo

== Series ==
- Andromeda
- Angel (on AXN Sci Fi Italy)
- Babylon 5
- BeastMaster (on AXN Sci Fi Central Europe and Russia)
- Bedlam (on AXN Sci Fi Russia)
- Being Human
- Bleach (on AXN Sci Fi Russia)
- Blood+
- Blue Gender
- Captain Tsubasa
- Charlie Jade
- Charmed (on AXN Sci Fi Italy)
- Chrono Crusade
- Cowboy Bebop
- D.Gray-man (on AXN Sci Fi Central Europe)
- Dark Angel (on AXN Sci Fi Central Europe and Italy)
- Dead Like Me (on AXN Sci Fi Italy and Russia)
- Death Note
- Detective Conan
- DICE
- Doctor Who (on AXN Sci Fi Central Europe)
- Dragon Ball GT (on AXN Sci Fi Central Europe)
- Earth: Final Conflict
- El Barco (on AXN Sci Fi Central Europe and Russia)
- El Internado (on AXN Sci Fi Russia)
- Eureka (on AXN Sci Fi Italy and Russia)
- Falling Skies (on AXN Sci Fi Russia)
- Farscape (on AXN Sci Fi Central Europe and Russia)
- Forbidden Science (on AXN Sci Fi Italy)
- Friday the 13th: The Series (on AXN Sci Fi Central Europe)
- Fringe (on AXN Sci Fi Russia)
- Fullmetal Alchemist
- Galactica (on AXN Sci Fi Central Europe)
- Ghost Hunters (on AXN Sci Fi Central Europe and Italy)
- Ghost in the Shell: Stand Alone Complex (on AXN Sci Fi Central Europe)
- Ghost Whisperer (on AXN Sci Fi Russia)
- Good vs Evil
- Haunted (on AXN Sci Fi Central Europe)
- Hellsing
- Hercules: The Legendary Journeys
- Heroes (on AXN Sci Fi Russia)
- Honey and Clover
- Jake 2.0 (on AXN Sci Fi Central Europe)
- Jericho (on AXN Sci Fi Russia)
- Kingdom Hospital (on AXN Sci Fi Russia)
- Kyle XY (on AXN Sci Fi Russia)
- Lexx (on AXN Sci Fi Russia)
- Lost (on AXN Sci Fi Central Europe and Russia)
- Lost Girl (on AXN Sci Fi Russia)
- Merlin (on AXN Sci Fi Central Europe and Russia)
- Millennium (on AXN Sci Fi Italy)
- Misfits (on AXN Sci Fi Russia)
- Mutant X (on AXN Sci Fi Italy and Russia)
- Mysterious Ways (on AXN Sci Fi Central Europe)
- Naruto (on AXN Sci Fi Central Europe)
- NANA
- One Piece (on AXN Sci Fi Russia)
- Painkiller Jane (on AXN Sci Fi Central Europe and Italy)
- Primeval (on AXN Sci Fi Central Europe)
- Primeval: New World (on AXN Sci Fi Italy)
- PSI Factor (on AXN Sci Fi Central Europe)
- Quantum Leap (on AXN Sci Fi Italy)
- Rabbit Fall
- Regenesis
- Roswell (on AXN Sci Fi Italy)
- Samurai 7
- Sanctuary (on AXN Sci Fi Central Europe)
- Sheena
- Slayers
- Sleepwalkers
- Sliders
- Smallville (on AXN Sci Fi Russia)
- Soul Eater (on AXN Sci Fi Central Europe)
- Star Trek: Deep Space Nine
- Star Trek: Enterprise
- Star Trek: The Next Generation
- Star Trek: The Original Series
- Star Trek: Voyager
- Stargate SG-1
- Stargate Atlantis
- Stargate Universe
- Supernatural (on AXN Sci Fi Russia)
- Teen Wolf (on AXN Sci Fi Russia)
- The 4400 (on AXN Sci Fi Italy and Russia)
- The Ghost Busters (on AXN Sci Fi Russia)
- The Lost World (on AXN Sci Fi Central Europe)
- The Nine Lives of Chloe King (on AXN Sci Fi Russia)
- The Outer Limits (on AXN Sci Fi Central Europe and Italy)
- The Real Ghostbusters (on AXN Sci Fi Russia)
- The Pretender (on AXN Sci Fi Italy)
- The Vampire Diaries (on AXN Sci Fi Russia)
- Tripping the Rift
- Tru Calling (on AXN Sci Fi Italy)
- Valemont (on AXN Sci Fi Russia)
- XIII: The Series (on AXN Sci Fi Russia)
- Z Nation (on AXN Sci Fi Italy)

== See also ==
- AXN
- AXN Black
- AXN Crime
- AXN White
