= Alfa Omega TV =

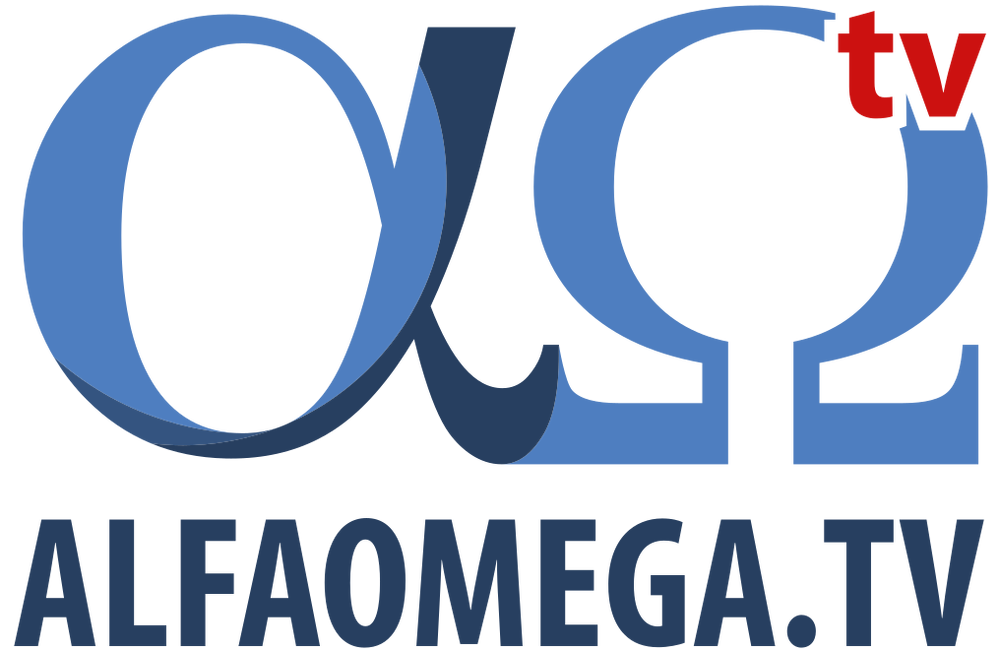
- Country: Romania
- Broadcast area: Nationally
- Headquarters: Strada Aurel Pop 8, Timișoara

Programming
- Language: Romanian
- Timeshift service: Alfa Omega TV Internațional

Ownership
- Owner: Alfa Omega TV Production SRL

History
- Launched: 11 June 2006

Links
- Website: alfaomega.tv

Alfa Omega TV is a Romanian Christian media organization, operating a TV channel with a similar name. It was launched on 11 June 2006 and the network broadcasts 24 hours a day, 7 days/week. The audiovisual license was given in December 2005.

Since 2010, the Alfa Omega TV channel was on the Romanian Audiovisual Authority's (CNA) list of must-carry programs for cable operators, being among the first 25 most-watched TV channels in Romania.

Alfa Omega TV rebranded for the first time on 8 July 2016. Plus, the format became a full 16:9 image format.

Alfa Omega TV channel is broadcast free-to-air via satellite over Europe, North Africa and the Middle East. The reception parameters (as of June 2025) are below:

- Satellite: Eutelsat 16A, 16° East
- System: DVB-S2
- Modulation: 8PSK
- Frequency: 12568 MHz
- Polarization: Vertical
- Symbol rate: 16667 Ks/s
- FEC: 3/5
