= Transilvania TV =

TTV Oradea
- Country: Romania
- Broadcast area: Transylvania
- Headquarters: Oradea, Romania

Programming
- Picture format: 576i (4:3/16:9 SDTV)

Ownership
- Owner: Centrul Național Media

History
- Launched: 2004
- Former names: Transilvania TV (2004-2008)

Transilvania TV is a regional channel located in Transylvania, owned by Centrul National Media.
