= TVR Moldova =

- Country: Moldova
- Broadcast area: International

Programming
- Picture format: 576i SDTV (HD only on TVR+)

Ownership
- Owner: Televiziunea Română
- Sister channels: TVR 1 TVR 2 TVR 3 TVR Cultural; TVR Folclor; TVR Info; TVRi; TVR Sport

History
- Launched: 12 September 2013 (Pre-Launch); 1 December 2013 (Channel TV Moldova)

Links
- Website: tvrmoldova.md

TVR Moldova is TVR's service for the Republic of Moldova, created in 2013 after an agreement between Moldova and Romania.

== History ==
TVR had been present in Moldova since 1991, following the country's independence. TVR 1 was widely distributed in Moldova for sixteen years. In September 2007, the Romanian network lost its rights to broadcast over-the-air, but demanded a new protocol to continue operating. Its terrestrial frequencies were given over to 2 Plus, a new local channel. The ECHR demanded a hearing on the retransmission case in 2008.

The conflict ended with a truce between the two parties, signed on 12 September 2013, by which the Moldovan authorities commit that the new TV channel will be taken over by all cable companies in the country, and TVR commits to produce shows about the true reality of the Republic of Moldova.

In 2025, the channel started broadcasting in Transnistria, enabling locals to have access to a source of information in Romanian. The breakaway state is dominated by Russian television channels, including channels that are banned in the rest of Moldova.
