= Televiziunea Târgu-Mureș =

TTM
- Country: Romania
- Broadcast area: Mureș County
- Headquarters: Str. Arany Janos, nr. 35, Târgu-Mureș, Romania

Programming
- Picture format: 4:3 (576i, SDTV)

Ownership
- Owner: TTM

History
- Launched: January 23, 2006
- Closed: June 16, 2020

Televiziunea Târgu-Mureș was a local news and entertainment television channel that broadcast in the area of Mureș County.

This channel was launched in 2006, and had some programs in Romanian (between 18:00 and 22:00) and Hungarian (between 16:00 and 18:00).

This channel was owned by a local media company named Informația de Mureș, who also owned a weekly newspaper with same name. The channel was disestablished in 2009.

It was closed in June 2020, when the National Audiovisual Council decided not to extend its licence.
