= INES (TV service) =

Romanian television streaming service

INES IPTV logo

iNES (TV service) is a TV service provided by the iNES group. The iNES group is the largest independently owned telecommunications company in Bucharest, with iNES is the first IPTV service provider in Romania, commencing services in 2005. iNES is also the first network which provided HD TV in Romania, since November 2008.

== Overview ==
The iNES TV service has more than 160 channels and broadcasts programs in Romanian, Hungarian, English, Bulgarian, German, Greek, Italian and Turkish. The signal is transmitted to a set top box via a broadband internet connection. iNES Mobile TV live TV broadcasts live television which can be viewed on mobile devices.

In 2009, iNES was the only IPTV provider in Romania, having invested €2,000,000 in the IPTV division.
