= TVR Craiova =

- Country: Romania
- Broadcast area: Argeș, Dâmbovița, Dolj, Gorj, Mehedinți, Olt, Vâlcea, Teleorman

Programming
- Picture format: 4:3 (576i SDTV)

Ownership
- Owner: Televiziunea Română

History
- Launched: 16 May 1996

Links
- Website: http://tvr-craiova.ro

Availability

Terrestrial
- Televiziunea Română: the same frequency as TVR 2

TVR Craiova is one of the six regional branches of Societatea Română de Televiziune (Romanian Television). It was established on May 16, 1996, and began broadcasting on December 1, 1998, with a live transmission from the Mihai Viteazul Square in Craiova.
