= TVR Sport =

- Country: Romania
- Broadcast area: Romania
- Headquarters: Bucharest

Programming
- Language: Romanian
- Picture format: 1080i HDTV (downscaled to 576i for the SDTV feed)

Ownership
- Owner: TVR
- Sister channels: TVR 1 TVR 2 TVR 3 TVR Cultural; TVR Info; TVRi; TVR Moldova; TVR Folclor

History
- Launched: March 30, 2024; 19 months ago

TVR Sport (Romanian pronunciation: [ˌtevere sport]) is a Romanian sports channel, created as part of TVR's strategic plans to increase its portfolio. The channel airs sporting events and related studio programming.

The fourteenth channel overall to be launched by TVR, it is considered by the company as its main means of promoting Romanian sports values, sports in general and sports as a healthy way of life.

== History ==
In February 2023, following the relaunch of TVR Info and TVR Cultural, TVR announced the creation of two new channels, TVR Folclor and TVR Sport. The CNA unanimously approved the two new channels on April 20.

One year after announcing the concept of the channel, TVR's head, Dan Cristian Turturică, announced a March launch. The channel started broadcasting on March 30, 2024. The launch was eyeing the then-forthcoming 2024 Summer Olympic Games, which were held in Paris. The channel's flagship program is Ora de sport, podcasts produced for the channel are also aired. The channel was added to the ratings measurement in June 2024.
