= AXN Spin =

- Broadcast area: Bosnia and Herzegovina; Croatia; Montenegro; North Macedonia; Poland; Romania; Serbia; Slovenia
- Headquarters: Hungary

Ownership
- Owner: Antenna Group
- Sister channels: AXN; AXN Black; AXN White

History
- Launched: January 11, 2012; 14 years ago (Poland); March 1, 2013; 13 years ago (Romania); April 9, 2013; 13 years ago (Serbia and Slovenia)

Links
- Website: www.axnspin.com

AXN Spin is a television channel owned by Sony Pictures Television International. When was launched was aimed primarily at a younger audience, which broadcasts reality shows, cartoons, anime and television series, but now shows reruns of other AXN channels.

== History ==
It started broadcasting on January 11, 2012. It is available in Poland on satellite platforms: Cyfrowy Polsat and nc+ (HD version). From June 1, 2012, join to offer digital TV network UPC Polska and TOYA (SD version).

On March 1, 2013, AXN Spin was launched in Romania on UPC and in March 2015 on DIGI.

On April 9, 2013, the channel was launched in Serbia and Slovenia, Montenegro, Croatia, Bosnia and Herzegovina and North Macedonia.

On July 2024, AXN Spin became a women's channel focusing on lifestyle and crime.

It is available CAM modules in Conax, Irdeto, Mediaguard, Nagravision and Viaccess.

== Logos ==
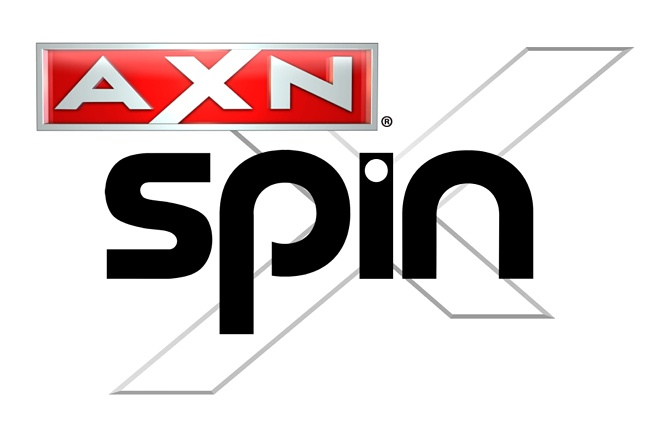
Former logo from 2012 to 2016

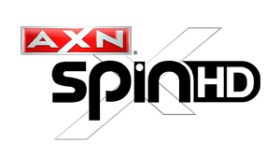
HD Logo

2016–present
