= TVR Folclor =

- Country: Romania
- Broadcast area: Romania
- Headquarters: Bucharest

Programming
- Language: Romanian
- Picture format: 1080i HDTV (downscaled to 576i for the SDTV feed)

Ownership
- Owner: TVR
- Sister channels: TVR 1 TVR 2 TVR 3 TVR Cultural; TVR Info; TVRi; TVR Moldova; TVR Sport

History
- Launched: November 27, 2023; 2 years ago (TV and online broadcast)
- Closed: April 1, 2026; 2 months ago (TV broadcast only)

Links
- Website: tvrinfo.ro

TVR Folclor (Romanian pronunciation: [ˌtevere folklor]) is a Romanian streaming television channel (but is still an online streaming channel)that broadcasts programming related to Romanian folk music and preservation of Romanian culture.

== History ==
In February 2023, following the relaunch of TVR Info and TVR Cultural, TVR announced the creation of two new channels, TVR Folclor and TVR Sport. The CNA unanimously approved the two new channels on April 20. The satellite broadcast was authorized on November 7.

The channel started broadcasting at 6:55am on November 27, 2023. For its first anniversary, it announced special editions of its flagship program, Tezaur folcloric.

On March 31, 2026, the National Audiovisual Council of Romania has withdrawn TVR Folclor's TV and satellite broadcast license and approved a new license for online broadcast only.
