= Akta =

- Type: Private
- Industry: Telecommunications
- Founded: 2005
- Headquarters: Bucharest, Romania
- Products: Cable Television; Cable Internet; Landline telephony
- Website: www.akta.ro

Akta, operating as Digital Cable Systems SA, is a Romanian telecommunication company. The company started in June 2005 as satellite television operator (DTH) under the name Max TV. In 2008, the company rebranded itself as Akta and started offering other services such as cable television, internet and landline telephony in rural areas and towns. This period marked significant advancements in telecommunications, with Akta becoming one of the first networks to establish a presence in rural areas.

In 2012, the company transferred subscribers of the satellite television service to the Dolce TV service of Romtelecom (later Telekom Romania).

On July 27, 2020, Digi Romania (RCS & RDS SA) received approval from the competition council to take over Akta customers from Digital Cable Systems SA and its subsidiaries, Akta Telecom SA and ATTP Telecommunications SA, all of which are owned by PineBridge Investments.
