= AXN (Italian TV channel) =

Former Italian pay-television channel owned by Sony Pictures Television

- Country: Italy

Programming
- Picture format: 1080i HDTV (downscaled to 16:9 576i for the SDTV feed)

Ownership
- Owner: Sony Pictures Entertainment

History
- Launched: 29 October 2005; 20 years ago
- Closed: 28 February 2017; 8 years ago

Links
- Website: http://www.axn.it/

AXN was an Italian pay television channel owned by Sony Pictures Entertainment. It focused on action-themed programmes, including action series and movies and action reality shows.

The channel was launched in October 2005. In March 2009, it launched its own HD simulcast feed. It closed down, along with AXN Sci-Fi on 28 February 2017.

== Programming ==
- Afterworld
- Andromeda
- Black Sails
- Blood Ties
- Breaking Bad
- Charlie's Angels
- The Closer
- The Collector
- CSI: Cyber
- Damages
- Fear Factor
- .hack//Sign
- Hawaii Five-0
- Hercules: The Legendary Journeys
- Justified
- Kidnapped
- Kung Fu
- MacGyver
- Man's Work
- Michael Hayes
- Mission: Impossible
- Most Shocking
- Murder
- Mutant X
- NCIS: New Orleans
- The Net
- New York Undercover
- Noein
- Odyssey 5
- The Outer Limits
- Quantum Leap
- Painkiller Jane
- Planetes
- Plunkett & Macleane
- Rescue Me
- Ripley's Believe It or Not!
- Scorpion
- Seven Days
- The Shield
- Sleeper Cell
- Sliders
- Stargate Universe
- Starsky & Hutch
- Strong Medicine
- Third Watch
- Ultimate Force
- The Vision of Escaflowne
- Wire in the Blood
- World's Most Amazing Videos
