= Animax (Portuguese TV channel) =

Animax Portugal
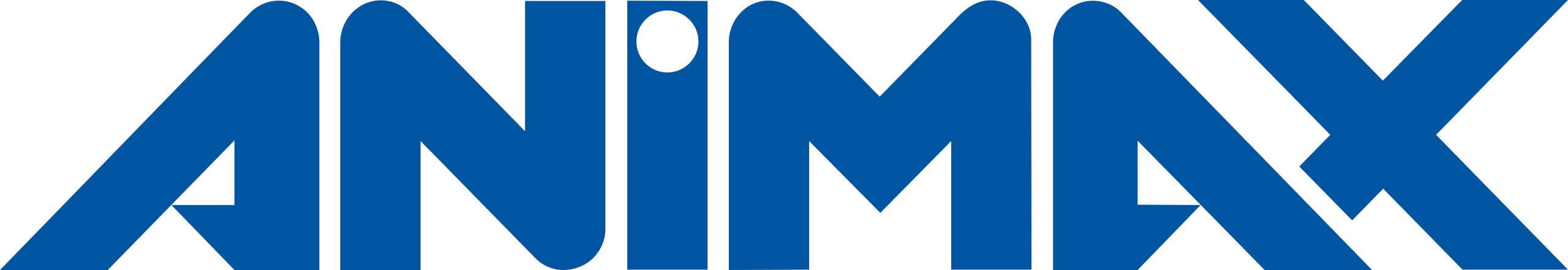
- Last logo, used between 2010 and 2011
- Country: Spain
- Broadcast area: Portugal
- Network: Animax

Programming
- Picture format: 4:3 (576i, SDTV)

Ownership
- Owner: Sony Corporation

History
- Launched: 20 October 2007 (programming block); 12 April 2008 (channel)
- Closed: 9 May 2011
- Replaced by: AXN Black (now AXN Movies)

Links
- Website: Animax Portugal (archived)

Animax Portugal was the Portuguese version of Animax. The channel launched on April 12, 2008, and was shuttered on May 9, 2011. The channel originally broadcast only anime, but then started airing live-action shows in 2009.

== History ==
Animax Portugal launched in Portugal as a programming block on AXN on 20 October 2007. The block ended in September 2008. The channel fully launched on 12 April 2008 in Portugal on Clix and MEO. The channel later extended its reach to ZON (now NOS) in April 2009.

Animax was shuttered on May 9, 2011, due to low ratings, when AXN Black launched in its place.

== See also ==
- Animax (international)
- AXN (Portugal)
