= TVR (TV network) =

Public television broadcaster in Romania

Societatea Română de Televiziune
- Logo used since 2022
- Trade name: Televiziunea Română; TVR
- Formerly: Radioteleviziunea Română (1956–1990)
- Type: State-owned enterprise
- Industry: Media
- Founded: 31 December 1956; 69 years ago
- Headquarters: Bucharest, Romania
- Area served: Romania; Moldova (through TVR Moldova)
- Key people: Dan Cristian Turturică, President and General Chairman
- Products: Television broadcasting
- Owner: Government of Romania
- Website: www.tvr.ro

Televiziunea Română (Romanian pronunciation: [televiziˈune̯a roˈmɨnə]), more commonly referred to as TVR [teveˈre], is the short name for Societatea Română de Televiziune ("Romanian Television Society"; SRTV), the Romanian public television. It operates nine channels: TVR 1, TVR 2, TVR 3, TVR Cultural, TVR Folclor, TVR Info, TVRi, TVR Moldova and TVR Sport along with six regional studios in Bucharest, Cluj-Napoca, Iași, Timișoara, Craiova, and Târgu Mureș.

TVR 1 has a total national coverage of 99.8%, virtually the entire Romanian population, and TVR 2 has 91% national coverage. All of the other channels and networks solely broadcast in major population centers. Even though it does not have the largest audience, due to the dominance of the five private TV networks (which consistently get higher ratings in the urban market segment), it offers a wider variety of services, including webcasts and international viewing via TVRi.

As of November 2019, TVR 1 and TVR 2 broadcast in full high-definition.

== History ==
=== Early years ===
TVR was established in 1956 when it began broadcasts on New Year's Eve, 31 December, from a little building (a deserted cinema studio) on 2 Molière Street. This began a long tradition of hosting the annual New Year special on this channel, which also doubles not just as a way to honor the achievements and events of the past year, but also as the anniversary of the beginning of television broadcasting in Romania.

=== During the Ceaușescu era ===
==== Headquarters and a second channel ====
TVR moved in 1969 to a new building, a purpose-built television center on Calea Dorobanților. It was designed by well-known architect Tiberiu Ricci, and since then serves as the network headquarters where the main studios and offices are located.

A second channel, TVR 2, was created in 1968, initially known as Programul 2, and, in the immediate aftermath, TVR became Programul 1. TVR2 was suspended in 1985, due to the "energy saving program" initiated by Nicolae Ceaușescu (1918–1989) and TVR1 became TVR again, becoming the only television station in Romania at the time, until the Romanian Revolution in 1989, corresponding with the fall of communism in the remaining Eastern Bloc countries that same year.

==== Program policy ====
From 1966 to 1980, TVR had an open program policy. Many films, serials, cartoons and other programs from the West, such as shows from the United States and Western Europe, were broadcast on the two main channels.

==== Color broadcasts and schedule changes ====
On 23 August 1983, TVR became the first Romanian channel to broadcast in color on the 23 August independence day. Although the rest of the Eastern Bloc countries adopted the French, Soviet-backed SECAM system, TVR chose to implement the West German PAL system. Plans to introduce color television broadcasting date as far back as 1968, when TVR began trial broadcasts in color. It was, however, deemed too costly at the time to impose color broadcasting, and plans were shelved up to 1983. Even so, before 1990, only some broadcasts were in color and very few people owned a color TV set. Full-time color television broadcasts were only achieved after the Romanian Revolution (circa 1990).

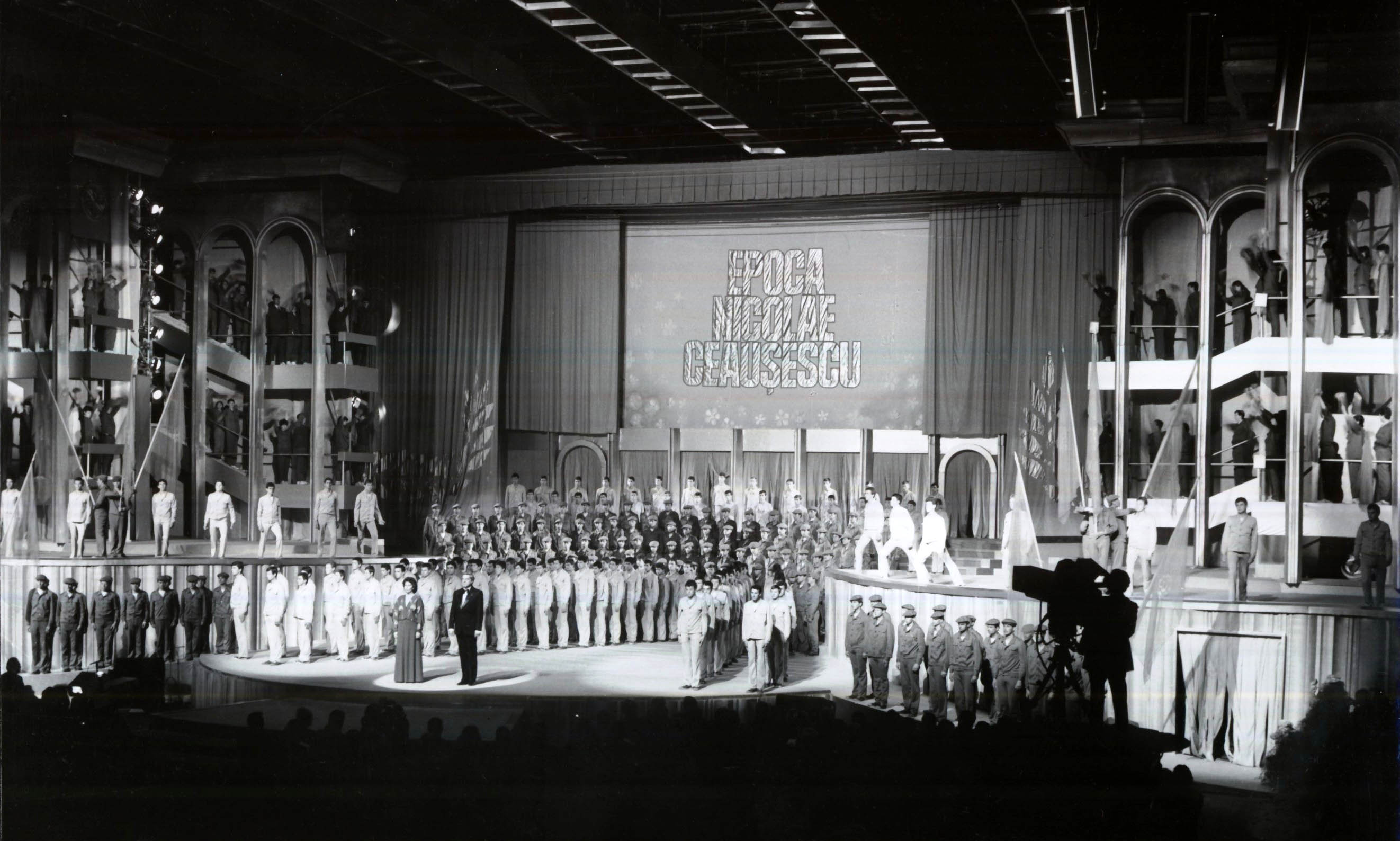
Propaganda TV program from 1986, titled Nicolae Ceaușescu Era

Due to the "energy saving program" between 1985 and 1989, TVR's broadcast schedule was severely limited to only about two hours per day, between 20:00 and 22:00, most of which were dedicated to Nicolae Ceaușescu's cult of personality, along with his wife Elena; with an exception on Saturdays, from 13:00 to 15:00 and 19:00 to 22:30 and Sundays (the same program as Saturdays, but with children's programs between 11:30 and 12:30). The two hours of programming were a combination of Romanian propaganda and general entertainment.

The schedule during the "energy saving program" (not including the weekend schedules) were as follows:

- 19:53 The Socialist Republic of Romania National Anthem ("Trei culori")
- 19:57 The Frontul Democrației și Unității Socialiste ("Democracy and Socialist Unity Front", FDUS) Anthem ("E scris pe tricolor Unire")
- 19:59:30 Opening (clock)
- 20:00 News (Telejurnal)
- 20:20 Special programs dedicated to Ceaușescu (documentary or musical shows)
- 21:00 An episode of theatre play, opera or a movie
- 21:50 News (Telejurnal)
- 21:58 Closing ("Hora Unirii")

In 1988, the programs increased to three hours per day during weekdays (from 19:00 to 22:00). The US TV series Dallas, introduced in the mid 1980s, became the only Western television program to be aired on the channel in color.

TVR Tower, the building of the TVR studios in Bucharest

=== During the Romanian Revolution ===
During the Romanian Revolution of 1989, TVR was an important focal point of events during the revolution. On the afternoon of 22 December 1989, rebels occupied the TVR building and announced that the Ceaușescus had fled. TVR changed its name to "Televiziunea Română Liberă" (TVRL), or Free Romanian Television. On 17 February 1990, TVR2 resumed broadcasting and TVRL became TVR1.

==== Propaganda under the FSN ====
TVR would remain a propaganda instrument in the hands of the newly created National Salvation Front (FSN), made up mostly of former second-rank Communists. The FSN used TVRL, by far the most widely penetrating information source at that time in Romania, to discredit protesters who were demanding a Communist-free government, denigrating them as "fascists". This culminated with the June 1990 riots in central Bucharest, crushed by the miners called in by president Ion Iliescu. After the riots ended, Iliescu was shown on TV congratulating the miners for "restoring law and order". A little while later, following protests from civil society, TVRL abandoned the "L", the designation "Free" and reverted to its previous name of TVR.

=== After the Romanian Revolution ===
==== Identity crisis and expansion ====
After 1990, lacking any strategy, TVR fell into a deep identity crisis. TVR changed its identity several times without any particular reason. On 1 January 1993, TVR, as a part of Radioteleviziunea Româna (RTVR), was admitted as a full active member of the European Broadcasting Union, simultaneously with the merger of OIRT and EBU.

In 1995, TVRi was launched on Great Union Day (1 December), the national holiday. In 1998, TVR International was renamed "TV Romania International", with a completely different identity.

In an unusual move at the time of the 1996 Romanian general election, TVR offered a tractor to the districts with the highest rural turnout in each of the seven regions. The offer was aimed at stabilizing support for Ion Iliescu's voter base, which was located primarily in rural areas.

On 25 September 1999, after rebranding three times, TVR1 became "(TV) Romania 1". In March 2000, TVR2 changed its identity, logo and presentation for the fourth time. On 1 March 2001, TVR2 switched to round-the-clock programming, "Romania 1" following suit 9 days later along with a new logo in the flag colors. The following year, TVR Cultural was launched, which mainly focused on cultural programming until its shutdown 10 years later in September 2012 (revived in late 2022).

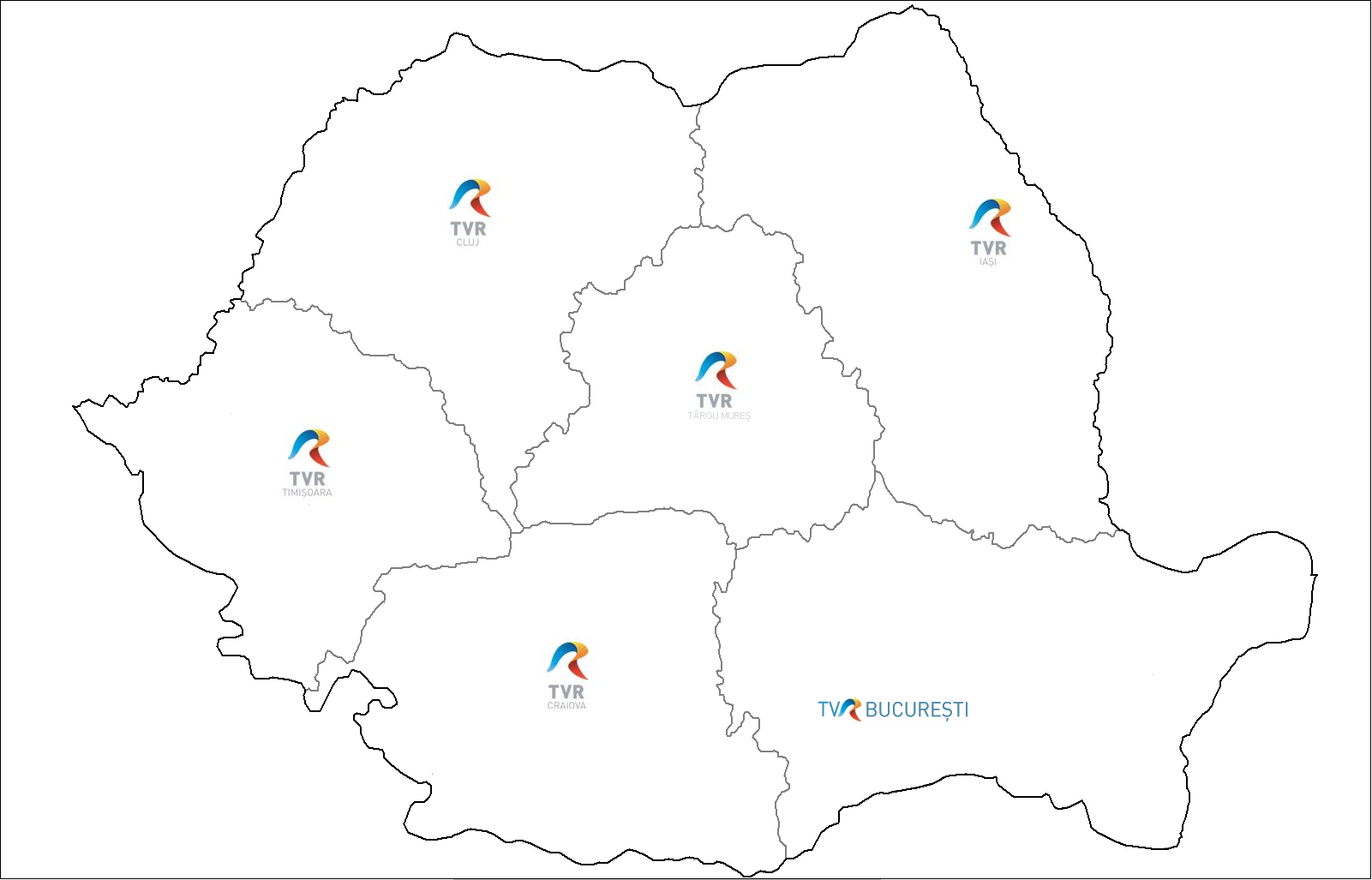
TVR regional studios

In 2003, the management started a controversial rebranding (a new identity was created by the British agency, English & Pockett). On 11 June 2004, all channels were renamed "TVR" and received the same identity.

==== Hosting the Eurovision, sports rights, and HD broadcasts ====
On 2 December 2006, Romania hosted the international Junior Eurovision Song Contest. The Romanian broadcaster was chosen by the European Broadcasting Union (EBU) to become the organizer of the 4th edition of the contest.

In August 2008, TVR acquired the broadcasting rights for the UEFA Champions League in Romania, for the following three seasons (between the 2009–10 and the 2011–12 season). From the 2012–13 season, it has the second option for the broadcasting rights.

On 1 June 2008, TVR HD was launched in high-definition, one the first stations to do so, after Pro TV launched a high-definition feed two years prior. Sports events such as Euro 2008 and the 2008 Summer Olympics were transmitted in HD. A few months later, on 10 October, TVR 3 was launched, which broadcast local programming, airing shows and news produced in the various regions of Romania. On 31 December 2008, TVR Info, a "must-carry" channel for all cable operators, was launched. The channel broadcasts traffic information, live feeds from cameras in various cities of Romania, and news.

==== Endangerment of Romanian participation in the Eurovision and debts ====
Former TVR logo, used from 2004 until 2022. Horizontal version used from 2008 until 2022

On 19 April 2016, it was reported that Romania's participation in the Eurovision Song Contest was in danger owing to TVR's repeated non-payment to the EBU of debts totaling 16 million franc, or 14.56 million euros, dating back to January 2007. The EBU had issued a deadline to the Romanian government requiring it to make satisfactory arrangements to repay the debt by 20 April, or else face exclusion from the contest. Two days later it announced that, following the government's failure to meet the deadline, the EBU had withdrawn all member services from TVR: these included – in addition to TVR's participation in the Song Contest – access to the Eurovision News and Sports News Exchanges, the right to broadcast specific sporting events, and entitlement to benefit from the EBU's legal, technical, research, expertise, and lobbying services.

TVR returned to participate in the 2017 contest, after making an agreement with the EBU to pay its debt.

Four new channels exclusive to TVR+ launched in 2025.

== Structure ==
TVR has seven national TV channels: TVR 1, TVR 2, TVR 3, TVR Cultural, TVR Folclor, TVR Info and TVR Sport. The broadcaster operates TVR Moldova, as well as the international service TVRi

Due to financial issues, TVR Cultural and TVR Info closed in the summer of 2012, however the latter was replaced by TVR News three months later. Nevertheless, on 21 July 2015, the TVR board decided to shut down also the TVR News channel, which stopped broadcasting on 1 August 2015. On 22 June 2022, TVR again relaunched the channel following an internal vote within its administration council. TVR Cultural was also relaunched on 1 December 2022.

It also has six regional TV channels or "studios" ("studiouri teritoriale"): TVR București, TVR Cluj, TVR Craiova, TVR Iași, TVR Tîrgu-Mureș and TVR Timișoara. TVR HD was available from 2008 to 2019, after which it was replaced by HD simulcasts of TVR 1 and TVR 2.

TVR Moldova broadcasts in Moldova from the local Chișinău studio.

Name	Logo	Description	Date of launch
TVR 1		The main flagship channel, carrying a generalist format of entertainment, factual, news, and public affairs programmes.	31 December 1956
TVR 2		A secondary generalist channel. From the mid-2010s through TVR Cultural's relaunch in 2022, it had a focus on arts and cultural programming.	2 May 1968; 19 February 1990
TVR 3		Carries a mix of local programmes produced by TVR's six regional channels.	10 October 2008
TVR Cultural		Primarily carries new and archive programmes related to the arts and Romanian culture.	19 April 2002; 1 December 2022
TVR Folclor		Carries music and cultural programming focused on the folklore and heritage of Romania and its rural regions.	27 November 2023
TVR Info		TVR's news channel, which carries news, public affairs, and documentary programmes.	31 December 2008; 22 June 2022
TVR Internațional		TVR's international service, which targets Romanian diaspora.	1 December 1995
TVR Moldova		TVR's regional television service for Moldova.	1 December 2013
TVR Sport		TVR's sport channel, which carries football, volleyball, swimming, water polo, gymnastics, boxing, snooker, chess, tennis, etc.	30 March 2024
TVR Cluj		Regional service targeting the Cluj, Alba, Bihor, Sălaj, Bistrița-Năsăud, Satu Mare, and Maramureș counties.	3 January 1990
TVR Craiova		Regional service targeting the Dolj, Mehedinți, Gorj, Vâlcea, Olt, Argeș, and Teleorman counties.	1 December 1998
TVR Iași		Regional service targeting the Moldova and Bukovina areas.	3 November 1991
TVR Târgu Mureș		Regional service targeting the Mureș, Harghita, Covasna, Brașov, and Sibiu counties.	6 May 2008
TVR Timișoara		Regional service targeting the Timiș, Caraș-Severin, Hunedoara, and Arad counties.	17 October 1994

== Funding ==
Until 2017, TVR was funded by a television licence mandatory for all holders of TV sets and also from advertising. This has been deemed unfair competition by the commercial TV stations, which must rely exclusively on revenue from advertisement and cable operators. After removing the 6.5 lei tax, TVR is mainly funded directly by the Romanian government, as well as advertising revenues which continue to fund TVR after 2017.

== Controversy ==
=== Airing of an alleged bribe ===
In October 2007, during its prime-time newscast, TVR aired a video showing Agricultural Minister Decebal Traian Remeș allegedly taking a bribe. In the aftermath, the Prime Minister at the time, Călin Popescu-Tăriceanu, criticized TVR for carrying out the minister's "public execution", and a heated debate that showed TVR's weakness in defending its independence ensued. The station's own director called the airing incorrect and illegal because it violated the presumption of innocence, while media organizations and the broadcast regulator defended the legitimacy of the airing, which they said served the public interest. Politicians issued intense attacks against TVR, which reorganized its news department into two divisions. One of its most critical journalists, Rodica Culcer, was placed in charge of supervising both divisions, which actually reduced her decision-making; reassignment has been a typical way through which Romanian governments reduce the power of non-loyal individuals, as more overt measures may have attracted charges of censorship. Other independent journalists were moved to afternoon or night newscasts.

=== Accusations of submissions to government control and censorship ===
TVR's board is appointed by the Romanian government and the Parliament of Romania. In its post-Communist history, TVR has been almost constantly suspected of submitting to government control and censorship.
