= Forbidden Science =

- Genre: Adult sci-fi series
- Created by: Doug Brode
- Starring: Vanessa Broze; Joanne Alderson; Levi Freeman; Mary LeGault; Noelle DuBois; Austin Ball
- Composers: Brent Barkman; Russ Mackay
- Country of origin: United States
- No. of seasons: 1
- No. of episodes: 13

Production
- Executive producer: John Quinn
- Camera setup: Film; Single-camera
- Running time: 23 minutes
- Production companies: Dangerous Tomorrows, Inc.; HBO Entertainment

Original release
- Network: Cinemax
- Release: January 9 – March 27, 2009

Forbidden Science is a science fiction television series created by Doug Brode that aired on Cinemax from January to March 2009. It is set in a near-future world in which people fulfill erotic desires with virtual reality and androids. The 13-episode series is a combination of film noir science fiction and erotic thriller, focuses on the lives of the 4Ever Innovations staff.

== Cast and characters ==
- Vanessa Broze as Julia White – A clone of a brain–computer interface researcher Stephanie White; who via a memory chip from the recently deceased researcher, is able to join the staff and continue Stephanie's work.
- Levi Freeman as Colin Sommers – The owner of 4Ever Innovations.
- Joanne Alderson as Bethany Montrose – Joins 4Ever Innovations as the head of sales after her marriage ends. A friend of Colin's from before the show.
- Noelle DuBois as Dr. Penny Serling – A researcher in android technology and virtual reality.
- Austin Ball as Dr. Philip Wise – A researcher in android technology and virtual reality. He becomes Penny Serling's lover.
- Richard Roy Sutton as Adrian Turner – A co-founder of 4Ever Innovations.
- Mary LeGault as Laura Lucas – Colin Sommers' Executive Assistant and lover.

== Episodes ==
No.	Title	Directed by	Written by	Original release date
1	"4Ever"	Melanie Orr	Doug Brode	January 9, 2009
Divorced and seeking a new life, Bethany Montrose goes to work for an old friend's corporation, 4Ever Innovations, where she works with scientists who perform advanced human cloning. Bethany's first project involves a husband who wants to be reunited with his wife, who was killed in an accident.
2	"Adversaries, Part 1"	Melanie Orr	Doug Brode	January 16, 2009
Julia White joins 4Ever Innovations as Colin, the CEO, goes public with the company's advances in the science of cloning organs, but there is an immediate backlash as an extremist attempts to shut the company down. Bethany is continually dreaming about her ex-husband, and an office romance is revealed.
3	"Adversaries, Part 2"	Melanie Orr	Doug Brode	January 23, 2009
A major incident shakes 4Ever Innovations: another innovator in the world of cloning – along with his alluring but deadly partner – begins competition with 4Ever. Julia struggles to adapt to life as a clone, as she continues to recover memories from her former life. Laura stumbles upon confidential information.
4	"Weekend"	Melanie Orr	Doug Brode	January 30, 2009
Laura discovers mysterious evidence at 4Ever, but Colin catches her snooping around. Penny builds a lovebot and tests the android herself. Not completely satisfied, she builds a second lovebot and tests that one, too. Julia meets a man, but she feels incomplete.
5	"Hotzone"	John Quinn	William Burke	February 6, 2009
A member of the cleaning crew commits industrial espionage at 4Ever, but his black market conspirator kills him. Penny helps Philip use the experimental Gold Chip to relive the dead man's last memories, including his murder.
6	"Property, Part 1"	Clay Borris	Doug Brode	February 13, 2009
Senator Montgomery's lovebot, Max, is malfunctioning; so Max is brought to 4Ever for repair. Bianca, the assassin, breaks into the 4Ever lab and tries to extract all of Max's memories; but Julia fights her off.
7	"Property, Part 2"	Clay Borris	Doug Brode	February 13, 2009
Julia sneaks Max, the Senator's lovebot, out of the 4Ever headquarters and goes into hiding. Colin sends Bethany, Penny, and Philip out in search of Julia. Colin and Bethany begin an office romance.
8	"Lonely"	Clay Borris	Doug Brode	February 20, 2009
Laura uses the 4Ever electronic device to have online, virtual love, where she learns secrets about the actual creator of 4Ever Technologies. Laura also learns of the new romance between Colin and Bethany. Philip asks Penny for a date, but she takes control by putting him into boyfriend training mode.
9	"Tarot"	Clay Borris	William Burke & Doug Brode	February 27, 2009
A beautiful young tarot card reader seduces a brilliant scientist in order to steal his corporate secrets. But, when he goes into a coma, she and her gang kidnap Bethany and hold her hostage in return for Colin's help. When Colin and Julia use their 4Ever equipment to revive the scientist, Julia discovers that the scientist is her former mentor and lover.
10	"Virus"	Melanie Orr	Doug Brode	March 6, 2009
Penny and Philip play a lovely, virtual reality game. Then, a hostile thinking computer virus takes over the 4Ever building and threatens the lives of Colin, Bethany, Julia, Penny, and Philip.
11	"Erase"	Melanie Orr	Doug Brode	March 13, 2009
Julia discovers a way to erase all of the memories of another woman's lifetime that had been stored in Julia's memory chip. Should she erase them and start living her own life? Bethany is having recurring nightmares about her ex-husband's affair with another woman. Adrian orders Colin to end his affair with Bethany.
12	"Secrets"	Melanie Orr	Doug Brode	March 20, 2009
After testing on the Gold Chip is successfully completed, Colin reneges on his deal with Adrian and the Level 6 project. Julia admits the truth about herself to her boyfriend, David. Senator Joan Montgomery lures 4Ever competitor Robert Armstrong into her conspiracy against Colin and Adrian, but Brazilian assassin Bianca forces a showdown with the Senator.
13	"Home"	Melanie Orr	Doug Brode	March 27, 2009
Colin is missing. Bethany has a recurring dream of the home where she had lived with Adrian. Philip refuses to completely abandon the Gold Chip, and he secretly investigates what went wrong with it. Penny is satisfied that Philip has completed his boyfriend training. Bethany discovers the startling truth about 4Ever and Level 6.
