= AXN Black (German TV channel) =

German pay-TV channel owned by High View Group

- Country: Germany
- Broadcast area: Germany, Austria, Switzerland
- Headquarters: Landshut, Germany

Programming
- Language: German
- Picture format: 1080i (HDTV)

Ownership
- Owner: High View Group
- Sister channels: AXN White

History
- Launched: November 1, 2004; 21 years ago
- Former names: AXN (2004–2019); Sony AXN (2019–2023)

Links
- Website: axn.de/axn-black/

Availability

AXN Black (formerly Sony AXN) is a German pay-TV channel from High View Group that mainly offers feature films and series, as well as reality formats and lifestyle broadcasts. The German version of the international AXN was launched on 1 November 2004 and was known simply as "AXN" until October 2019 and later rebranded as Sony AXN until August 2023. The network was formerly wholly owned by Sony Pictures Entertainment.

== Distribution and history ==
AXN reaches 5.9 million subscribers via satellite (Sky, Austriasat), Kabel (Kabel Deutschland, Unitymedia, Kabelkiosk, Liwest, Cablecom), IPTV (Telekom Entertain, Swisscom, Sunrise, A1 Telekom) and online streaming (Magine TV).

An HD simulcast version can be received via Telekom Entertain since 1 February 2011. A Kabelkiosk connection took place on 26 June 2012, followed by Sky on 4 October 2012, and Kabel Deutschland on 15 October.

Since the beginning of September 2014, the channel has been shown in the payment service offered by the IPTV provider Magine TV.

On 8 September 2015, Sony Pictures Television announced that AXN Deutschland would also take over the new global design and channel logo. The conversion and takeover took place as of 9 October 2015.

On 24 October 2016, the distribution of the channel via Sky Deutschland in Germany and Austria ceased, as no agreement could be reached between Sony and Sky.

On 17 October 2019, the channel was renamed to "Sony AXN" and again adopted a new logo.

In July 2023, two Sony cable television channels were sold and managed under an independent media company, High View Group after the closing its deal. On 1 September 2023, Sony AXN and Sony Channel were renamed under the AXN branded names: AXN Black and AXN White.

== Gallery ==
AXN logo used from 2004 up to 2015

Second generation AXN logo used from 2015 until 2019

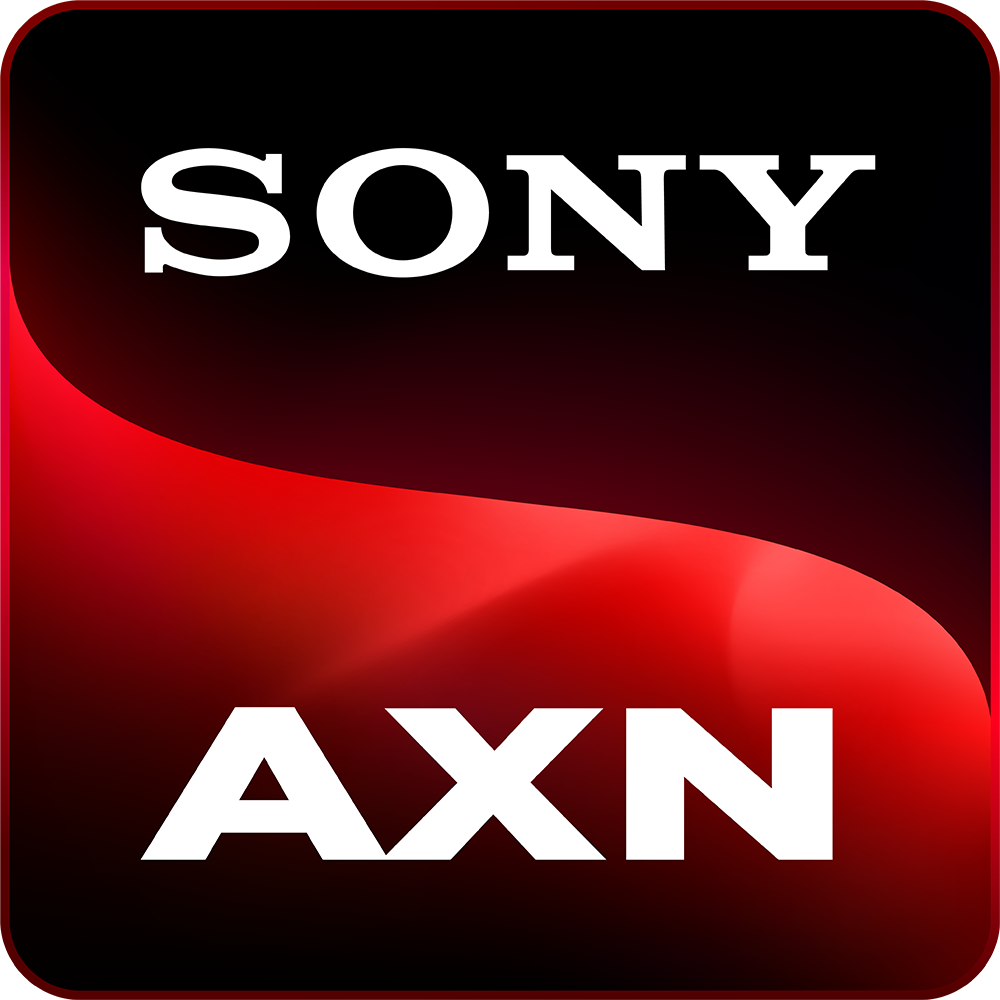
Sony AXN logo from 2019 until 2023

AXN Black logo used from 2023

== Programming ==
- 18 Wheels of Justice (Highway to Hell - 18 Räder aus Stahl) (2007–2009)
- 19-2 (2016–2023)
- The Agency (The Agency - Im Fadenkreuz der CIA) (2009–2011)
- The Amazing Race (2004–2009)
- The Blacklist (2021–present)
- Breaking Bad (2009–2015)
- Californication (2008–2015)
- Charlie's Angels (1976) (Drei Engel für Charlie) (2007–2009)
- Charlie's Angels (2011) (Drei Engel für Charlie) (2012)
- Chicago P.D. (2014–present)
- Cold Squad (2004–2010)
- Common Law (2014–2016)
- Dexter (2009–2017)
- The District (The District - Einsatz in Washington) (2007–2009)
- Elementary (2014–2016)
- The Firm (Die Firma) (2014–2016)
- Flashpoint (2013–2018)
- F/X: The Series (2006–2008)
- Gomorrah (Gomorrha – Die Serie) (2023–present)
- Hannibal (2014–2023)
- Hawaii Five-O (1968) (Hawaii Fünf-Null) (2013–2015)
- Highlander (2006–2008)
- Homicide: Life on the Street (Homicide) (2006–2008)
- House of Lies (2013–2017)
- Hustle (Hustle - Unehrlich währt am längsten) (2015–2019)
- Ice (2018–2020)
- Justified (2014–present)
- Kingdom (2015–2022)
- Knight Rider (1982) (2009–2011)
- Knight Rider (2008) (2014–2016)
- Kojak (2008–2011)
- L.A.'s Finest (2019–present)
- Lost Girl (2016)
- Magnum, P.I. (Magnum) (2010–2013)
- Métal Hurlant Chronicles (Schwermetall) (2018–2022)
- Michael Hayes (Michael Hayes - Für Recht und Gerechtigkeit) (2004–2006)
- The Oath (2018–present)
- Police Rescue (Police Rescue - Gefährlicher Einsatz) (2006–2010)
- Power (2015–2022)
- Queen of Swords (2004–2006)
- Relic Hunter (Relic Hunter - Die Schatzjägerin) (2006–2008)
- RoboCop (Robocop - Die Serie) (2006–2008)
- Rush (2015–2021)
- Sea Patrol (2015–present)
- Sheena, Queen of the Jungle (2004–2007)
- The Shield (The Shield - Gesetz der Gewalt) (2005–2018)
- Sleeper Cell (2008–2010)
- Snatch (2017–2021)
- Spooks (Spooks - Im Visier des MI5) (2015–2019)
- Starsky & Hutch (2007–2009)
- The Streets of San Francisco (Die Straßen von San Francisco) (2013–2015)
- Survivor (2004–present)
- True Justice (2012–2016)
- Unforgettable (2022–present)
- Walker, Texas Ranger (2006–2008)
- Wolffs Revier (2013–2015)
- Yellowstone (2020–present)
