= TVR Tîrgu-Mureș =

TVR Tg. Mureș
- Country: Romania
- Broadcast area: Alba, Brașov, Covasna, Harghita, Mureș
- Headquarters: Târgu Mureș

Programming
- Picture format: 4:3 / 16:9 (576i, SDTV)

Ownership
- Owner: Televiziunea Română

History
- Launched: 6 May 2008

Links
- Website: mures.tvr.ro

Availability

Terrestrial
- Televiziunea Română: 56 - 8P

Streaming media
- Digi: 226

TVR Tîrgu-Mureș is one of the six regional branches of the Societatea Română de Televiziune (Romanian Public Television). It began broadcasting on 6 May 2008, in Târgu Mureș. TVR Tîrgu-Mureș programmes are broadcast in the Transylvania region of Romania, covering five counties in the central part of the country.

TVR Tîrgu-Mureș broadcasts in Romanian and Hungarian languages.
