= TVR Timișoara =

- Country: Romania
- Broadcast area: Arad, Caraș-Severin, Hunedoara, Timiș

Programming
- Picture format: 4:3 (576i, SDTV)

Ownership
- Owner: Televiziunea Română

History
- Launched: 17 October 1994

Links
- Website: http://timisoara.tvr.ro/

Availability

Terrestrial
- TVR: channel 53

TVR Timișoara is one of the six regional branches of Societatea Română de Televiziune (Romanian Television Company). On air since 17 October 1994 from a studio in Cluj, which was built in 1990 and from one in Iași that began broadcasting in 1991. Its initial airing schedule had a weekly duration of 35 minutes, whereas by 2004 the time on air was over 1200 minutes per week. From 1997 to 2004, Brindusa Armanca managed the station.
