= TVR Info =

News television channel in Romania

- Country: Romania
- Broadcast area: Romania
- Headquarters: Bucharest

Programming
- Language: Romanian
- Picture format: 1080i HDTV (downscaled to 576i for the SDTV feed)

Ownership
- Owner: TVR
- Sister channels: TVR 1 TVR 2 TVR 3 TVR Cultural; TVR Folclor; TVRi; TVR Moldova; TVR Sport

History
- Launched: December 31, 2008; 17 years ago (original); June 22, 2022; 3 years ago (relaunch)
- Closed: August 15, 2012; 13 years ago (original)
- Replaced by: TVR News (2012–2015)

Links
- Website: tvrinfo.ro

Availability

Terrestrial
- Digital terrestrial television: Channel 4

TVR Info (Romanian pronunciation: [ˌtevere ˈinfo]) is a news television channel that broadcasts 24/7 mainly news, utility information, and live traffic images from the major cities through the country. It also sometimes broadcasts documentaries and sport events. It was the second niche channel launched by the public TV broadcaster, after TVR Cultural, and the third news television channel in Romania behind Realitatea TV and Antena 3.

At its launch, the channel aired utility info, such as traffic and airport weather. Every hour it broadcast news (politic, international, sports, weather), in a Euronews-like format (no presenters, just image and sound).

On May 2, 2011, TVR made a rebranding of the channel and a significant programme change. Then it had a more dynamic programme, with news every hour and debates in between, competing with the other news channels, Antena 3 CNN and Realitatea TV.

On August 15, 2012, under a series of measures for economical recovery of the TVR, the channel was closed down, with the other niche channel TVR Cultural also closing down a month later. On November 15, 2012, it was relaunched under a new name: TVR News, however this channel had closed down again in 2015.

On February 9, 2022, TVR approved an internal vote in its council to relaunch TVR Info and TVR Cultural, the former of which was given mainly due to the rise of online misinformation. Its services resumed on June 22.
