= TVRi =

- Country: Romania
- Broadcast area: International

Programming
- Picture format: 576i SDTV (HD only on TVR+)

Ownership
- Owner: Televiziunea Română
- Sister channels: TVR 1 TVR 2 TVR 3 TVR Cultural; TVR Folclor; TVR Info; TVR Moldova; TVR Sport

History
- Launched: December 1, 1995; 30 years ago
- Former names: TVR Internațional; România Internațional

Links
- Website: tvr.ro tvri live

Availability

Streaming media
- Televiziunea Română official website: tvr.ro

TVR Internațional (Romanian pronunciation: [ˌtevere ˌinternat͡si.oˈnal]), abbreviated as TVRi, is the international channel of Televiziunea Română, Romania's government-funded television network. TVR International provides free-to-air 24-hour broadcast throughout Europe, Canada and the United States. In July 2005, it introduced broadcasts to Australia and New Zealand.

The channel provides content mainly in Romanian, for Romanians throughout the world, but also in Romania's minority languages, especially Hungarian, Romany and German. Some content is also provided in English. The channel is broadcast live on the internet.

In 2004, it was made available on HOT in Israel, after requests from Romanian-speaking subscribers.

On October 2, 2007, it launched in Portugal on TV Cabo, in conjunction with the addition of new channels for immigrant communities.

Its most watched programming during the year is the Eurovision Song Contest.

In 2020, TVR launched an HD feed of TVR i on TVR+. It broadcasts in 720p format.
