= TVR Cultural =

Television channel in Romania

- Country: Romania

Programming
- Picture format: 1080i HDTV (downscaled to 576i for the SDTV feed, only on terrestrial)

Ownership
- Owner: Televiziunea Română
- Sister channels: TVR 1 TVR 2 TVR 3 TVR Folclor; TVR Info; TVRi; TVR Moldova; TVR Sport

History
- Launched: April 26, 2002 (original); December 1, 2022 (relaunch)
- Closed: September 15, 2012 (original)
- Former names: Cultural

Links
- Website: http://cultural.tvr.ro/

Availability

Terrestrial
- Digital terrestrial television: Channel 5
- Digi cable: 198
- Orange România Communications: 145

TVR Cultural (Romanian pronunciation: [ˌtevere ˌkultuˈral]) is the cultural channel of Romania's government-funded television network Televiziunea Română (TVR). It provides cultural news, documentaries about the arts, as well as various shows, musicals and theatrical pieces. It was closed in September 2012 and restarted in December 2022.

== History ==
TVR Cultural began transmission in April 26, 2002. It was modelled on the Franco-German TV channel Arte and other European channels focused on cultural and artistic programming.

Due to a financial crisis, TVR president Claudiu Săftoiu decided to end TVR Cultural broadcasts in the summer of 2012. There was widespread criticism of this decision, which came at a time when other public broadcasters in the Central and Eastern Europe, including Polish Telewizja Polska and Czech Television, were expanding their cultural output.

TVR Cultural started rebroadcasting again in 2022, ten years after its closure, following an internal vote within TVR. On 7 September 2022, Romania's National Audiovisual Council granted a license to restart broadcasting.

On 1 December 2022, to coincide with Romania's National Day, TVR Cultural relaunched its broadcasts with the stated aim of "[creating] bridges between tradition and modernity, between conservatism and progressivism, between rural and urban, between peripheral and central." The first day of broadcasts included debates on cultural topics, interviews with Romanian cultural figures – including director Daniel Jiga of the Romanian National Opera – as well as rebroadcast of a 1978 staging of Victor Ion Popa's play "Take, Ianke and Cadîr".

Under new TVR president Dan-Cristian Turturică, the relaunched TVR Cultural aims to bring focus to young artists from Romania and Moldova to showcase minority cultures in Romania, to document the state of culture during Romania's communist period and rebroadcast archival programming alongside new concerts, plays, as well as other cultural events. Its regular segment, "Jurnal Cultural", is hosted by Bogdan Stănescu and covers current affairs in the field of arts and culture in Romania as well as abroad.

== See also ==
- Arte
- Mezzo
- TVP Kultura
