= TVR 2 =

Romanian public TV channel

- Country: Romania
- Broadcast area: Romania, reaching bordering regions via overspill of the Romanian terrestrial network
- Headquarters: Bucharest, Romania

Programming
- Picture format: 1080i HDTV (downscaled to 576i for the SDTV feed)

Ownership
- Owner: Televiziunea Română
- Sister channels: TVR 1 TVR 3 TVR Cultural; TVR Folclor; TVR Info; TVRi; TVR Moldova; TVR Sport

History
- Launched: 2 May 1968; 58 years ago
- Former names: Programul 2 (until 1985)

Links
- Website: tvr2.tvr.ro

Availability

Terrestrial
- Digital terrestrial television: Channel 2

TVR 2 (Romanian pronunciation: [ˌtevere ˈdoj], spelled out as Televiziunea Română 2, "Romanian Television 2") is the second channel of the public broadcaster TVR.

The channel was launched on 2 May 1968, but it was suspended from 20 January 1985, until 19 February 1990. From 2003, it has been a market leader in Romania with television shows such as Tonomatul DP2 and the British television series Doctor Who, but since 2015, it has been a general arts and culture channel. TVR 2 launched an HD simulcast on 3 November 2019, alongside the Romanian Television's flagship channel, TVR 1.

== History ==
It started broadcasting on 2 May 1968 under the name Programul 2. Initially it broadcast once a week, every Thursday, but from June 16 the same year it started broadcasting on Sundays, and next month, from 20 July, on Saturdays. In 1972, the channel started broadcasting daily, being received by 15 to 20% of the population.

In January 1985, TVR 2 was suspended, but following the fall of the dictatorship in December 1989, technicians from Studio 6 started to work on the relaunch of the channel, which was achieved in February 1990, broadcasting from 6pm to 11pm. Near the first democratic elections held in May, the channel was suspended for a few days in order to concentrate its efforts on the elections. TVR's mentality disrespected the channel and its subsequent treatment as a second-tier programming service.

The channel's terrestrial coverage grew starting in 1992. In 2001 it started 24/7 broadcasts. In 2004, around the time of the rebrand, the terrestrial reach was of 90%. The VHF transmitter in Bucharest (channel 2) that carried TVR 2 was shut down in 2005, moving to UHF channel 51. Until 2009, the channel aired regional programming. The launch of TVR 3 led to the end of the timeshare arrangements.

== Programming ==
The main news television program of the channel is Ora de știri ("News Hour"), which is aired daily at 6:00 pm UTC+02:00. Also, another news program broadcast on this channel, Telejurnal, is aired daily at 12:00 am on TVR 2, which used to be the main news program, until 3 October 2021.

The channel mainly airs cultural content since the shut down of TVR Cultural, movies, documentaries, and very rarely sport events. The most popular shows are Câștigă România, which was moved to TVR 1 in 2022, Drag de România mea, a folk music show, hosted by Paul Ciprian Surugiu, Pescar Hoinar, a show about two men fishing, and Ferma, which discusses farm animals.

== See also ==
- Romanian Television
