= TVR 1 =

- Country: Romania
- Broadcast area: Romania, reaching bordering regions via overspill of the Romanian terrestrial network
- Headquarters: Bucharest, Romania

Programming
- Picture format: 1080i HDTV (downscaled to 576i for the SDTV feed)

Ownership
- Owner: Televiziunea Română
- Sister channels: TVR 2 TVR 3 TVR Info; TVR Cultural; TVR Folclor; TVRi; TVR Sport

History
- Launched: 31 December 1956; 69 years ago (regular broadcasts)
- Former names: TVR (1955–1972, 1985–1989); Programul 1 (1972–1985); TVRL (1989–1990); România 1 (1999–2004)

Links
- Website: tvr1.tvr.ro

Availability

Terrestrial
- Digital terrestrial television: Channel 1 (SD)

TVR 1 (Romanian pronunciation: [ˌtevere ˈunu]; spelled out as Televiziunea Română 1, "Romanian Television 1") is the main channel of the Romanian public broadcaster Televiziunea Română.

== History ==
Experimental television broadcasts in Romania started on 23 August 1955. Regular television service began on the evening of 31 December 1956. Until 1968, with the exception of a period between 1985 and 1990, it was the only television channel in Romania.

As part of an energy savings plan initiated in 1985 during the Ceaușescu regime, television broadcasts were limited to two hours a day (20:00 to 22:00), though this was increased to three hours in 1988, pushing the start-up time ahead by one hour. TVR during the fall of the regime was renamed TVRL; following the relaunch of TVR 2, the L was removed and the channel reverted to TVR 1.

== Program for minorities ==
Romanian TV airs the following channels for minority nationally:

- Magazin în limba germană (German)

== See also ==
- Television in Romania
