= Sunt celebru, scoate-mă de aici! season 1 =

Sunt celebru, scoate-mă de aici!
- Season 1
- Presented by: Cabral Ibacka and Mihai Bobonete
- No. of days: 21
- No. of contestants: 13
- Winner: Cătălin Moroșanu
- Runner-up: Dorian Popa
- Location: Kruger National Park, South Africa
- No. of episodes: 21

Release
- Original network: Pro TV
- Original release: 16 February – 8 March 2015

Season chronology
- ← Previous; None Next → Season 2

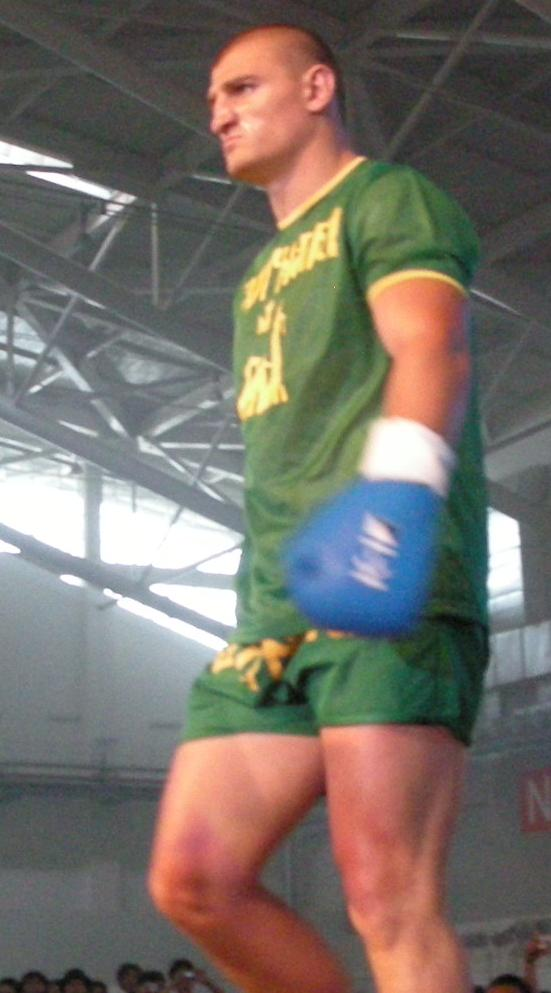
Cătălin Moroșanu: the “King of the Jungle”

The first season of Sunt celebru, scoate-mă de aici! was broadcast on Pro TV from 16 February 2015 to 8 March 2015. The show has been hosted by Cabral Ibacka and Mihai Bobonete and it was filmed at the Kruger National Park in South Africa.

== Contestants ==
The show began with 10 celebrity contestants. Then 3 more came: Alina Plugaru and Gabi Jugaru on Day 3 and Vladimir Drăghia on Day 7.

Celebrity	Age	Famous for	Entered	Exited	Finished
Cătălin Moroșanu	30	Kickboxer	Day 1	Day 21	King of the Jungle
Dorian Popa	26	Film actor & Singer	Day 1	Day 21	Runner-up
Ruby	26	Pop Singer	Day 1	Day 21	Evicted
Gina Pistol	34	Television Personality & Model	Day 1	Day 20	Evicted
Luminița Nicolescu	55	Aerobic Instructor	Day 1	Day 18	Walked
Andreea Moldovan	29	Former Masterchef România Contestant	Day 1	Day 18	Evicted
Vladimir Drăghia	28	Film actor & Former Olympic Athlete	Day 7	Day 17	Evicted
Alina Plugaru	27	Former Porn Actress	Day 3	Day 16	Evicted
Elena Lasconi	42	Journalist & Television presenter	Day 1	Day 14	Evicted
Elena Merişoreanu	65	Singer	Day 1	Day 13	Evicted
Gabi Jugaru	47	Comedian & Entrepreneur	Day 3	Day 12	Walked
Mihai Trăistariu	35	Pop Singer	Day 1	Day 11	Walked
Pacha Man	38	Reggae Musician & Rapper	Day 1	Day 6	Walked

== Results and elimination ==
Indicates that the celebrity was immune from the vote
Indicates that the celebrity received the most votes from the public
Indicates that the celebrity received the fewest votes and was eliminated immediately (no bottom two)
Indicates that the celebrity was named as being in the bottom 2, or bottom 3

#	Week 1	Week 2		Week 3								Number of trials
#	Week 1	Day 13	Day 14	Day 15	Day 16	Day 17	Day 18	Day 19	Day 20	Day 21		Number of trials
#	Week 1	Day 13	Day 14	Day 15	Day 16	Day 17	Day 18	Day 19	Day 20	Round 1	Round 2	Number of trials
Cătălin	—	Safe	Safe	Safe	—	Safe	Safe	Safe	Safe	Safe	King of the Jungle (Day 21)	5
Dorian	—	Safe	Safe	Safe	—	Safe	Safe	Safe	Safe	Safe	Runner-up (Day 21)	13
Ruby	—	Safe	Safe	Safe	—	Bottom 2	Safe	Safe	Bottom 2	3rd	Evicted (Day 21)	7
Gina	—	Safe	Safe	Safe	—	Safe	Bottom 2	Safe	Bottom 2	Evicted (Day 20)		5
Luminița	—	Safe	Safe	Safe	—	Safe	Safe	Walked (Day 18)				1
Andreea	—	Bottom 2	Safe	Bottom 2	Win	Safe	Bottom 2	Evicted (Day 18)				3
Vladimir	Not in Camp	Immune	Bottom 2	Safe	—	Bottom 2	Evicted (Day 17)					3
Alina	—	Safe	Safe	Bottom 2	Lost	Evicted (Day 16)						3
Elena L.	—	Safe	Bottom 2	Evicted (Day 14)								1
Elena M.	—	Bottom 2	Evicted (Day 13)									2
Gabi	—	Walked (Day 12)										0
Mihai	—	Walked (Day 11)										1
Pacha	Walked (Day 6)											0
Withdrew	Pacha	Mihai	Gabi	None				Luminița	None			
Bottom two (named in)	None	Andreea, Elena M.	Elena L., Vladimir	Andreea, Alina		Ruby, Vladimir	Gina, Andreea	None	Ruby, Gina	No bottom two		
Eliminated	None	Elena M. Fewest votes to save	Elena L. Fewest votes to save	None	Alina; Lost trial	Vladimir; Fewest votes to save	Andreea; Fewest votes to save	None	Gina; Fewest votes to save	Ruby; Fewest votes to save	Dorian; Fewest votes to win	
Eliminated	None	Elena M. Fewest votes to save	Elena L. Fewest votes to save	None	Alina; Lost trial	Vladimir; Fewest votes to save	Andreea; Fewest votes to save	None	Gina; Fewest votes to save	Ruby; Fewest votes to save	Cătălin; Most votes to win	

== Tucker trials ==
The contestants take part in daily trials to earn food. These trials aim to test both physical and mental abilities. The winner is usually determined by the number of stars collected during the trial, with each star representing a meal earned by the winning contestant for their camp mates.

The public voted for who they wanted to face the trial
The contestants decided who did which trial
The trial was compulsory and neither the public or celebrities decided who took part

Trial number	Air date	Name of trial	Celebrity participation	Public vote %	Winner/Number of stars	Notes
1	16 February	Pampering And Indignation	Dorian	—	4/10 stars	None
2	17 February	Disaster On The Ground Floor	Dorian	—	4/10 stars	None
3	18 February	Greasy Spoon	Andreea, Mihai	—	12/12 stars	1
4	19 February	Carnage In Pants	Ruby, Alina, Gina, Dorian	—	8/12 stars	None
5	20 February	Terror On The Phone	Dorian	—	5/12 stars	None
6	21 February	Spin The Bottle	Dorian, Elena M., Cătălin, Ruby	—	7/12 stars	None
7	22 February	Up And Away	Dorian, Alina, Cătălin, Ruby, Gina, ~~Elena M.~~	—	1/6 stars	2
8	23 February	Hard With The Memory	Dorian, Vladimir	—	7/12 stars	3
9	24 February	Attention, It Falls!	Dorian, Vladimir	—	4/12 stars	4
10	25 February	Cranes, Laugh In The Sun!	Dorian, Ruby	—	5/12 stars	5
11	26 February	Tavern Of Terror	Dorian, Cătălin	—	8/12 stars	None
12	27 February	Harebrained	Elena L.	—	2/11 stars	None
13	28 February	Box Of Horrors	Luminița	—	7/10 stars	None
14	1 March	Black Holes Terror	Andreea, Gina	—	5/9 stars	None
15	2 March	Black Friday	Dorian, Vladimir	—	5/8 stars	None
16	3 March	Return Of The Prodigal Stomach	Alina, Andreea	—	2/8 stars	None
17	4 March	Buried Alive	Cătălin	—	7/7 stars	None
18	5 March	Buzz Show	Gina, Ruby	—	1/6 stars	None
19	6 March	Groundhog Day	Dorian, Gina	—	2/4 stars	None
20	7 March	Museum Of Horrors	Ruby	—	3/4 stars	None
21	8 March	Tears And Teeth	Dorian	—	4/4 stars	None
22	8 March	One Helmet (From Home Alone, Alone Helmet)	Cătălin	—	4/4 stars	None
23	8 March	Feel Disgusted, Please!	Ruby	—	1/4 stars	None

=== Notes ===
- ^1 Mihai and Andreea win the stars at the trial, but after an incident with Dorian, who strained sugar in his knapsack, the celebrities have not received anything, because of policy set by the producers.
- ^2 Elena M. did not participate in the challenge because of her age.
- ^3 Elena M. was ruled out of this trial for medical reasons
- ^4 Cătălin and Elena M. were excluded from this trial on medical grounds.
- ^5 Cătălin, Elena M. and Luminița were excluded from this trial on medical grounds.

=== Star count ===
Celebrity	Number of stars earned	Percentage
Cătălin Moroșanu	27/41 stars	65,8%
Dorian Popa	64/126 stars	50,7%
Ruby	26/56 stars	46,4%
Gina Pistol	17/37 stars	45,9%
Luminița Nicolescu	7/10 stars	70%
Andreea Moldovan	19/29 stars	65,5%
Vladimir Drăghia	16/32 stars	50%
Alina Plugaru	11/26 stars	42,3%
Elena Lasconi	2/11 stars	18,1%
Elena Merişoreanu	8/18 stars	44,4%
Gabi Jugaru	None	N/A
Mihai Trăistariu	12/12 stars	100%
Pacha Man	None	N/A

== Celebrity Chest challenges ==
Two or more celebrities are chosen to take part in the "Celebrity Chest" challenge to win luxuries for camp. Each challenge involves completing a task to win a chest to take back to camp. However, to win the luxury item in the chest, the campmates must correctly answer a question. If they fail to answer correctly, the luxury item is forfeited and a joke prize is won.

The celebrities got the question correct
The celebrities got the question wrong

Episode	Air date	Celebrity participation	Prize
2	17 February	Mihai, Ruby	5 Plums
4	19 February	Elena M., Luminița	Rosemary Box
5	20 February	Mihai, Pacha	N/A
6	21 February	Andreea, Gina	2 Bags of Potato Chips
7	22 February	Elena L., Vladimir	Coffee
8	23 February	Mihai, Gabi	12 Peanuts
9	24 February	Alina, Mihai	2 Bottles of Mineral Water
11	26 February	Elena L., Gabi	Tea
12	27 February	Vladimir, Gina	Cheese
13	28 February	Ruby, Cătălin, Dorian, Vladimir	Pineapple
14	1 March	Everyone	Four Pieces of Cake
15	2 March	Alina, Andreea	Food
16	3 March	Everyone	Food
17	4 March	Vladimir, Andreea	Champagne
18	5 March	Dorian, Gina	N/A
19	6 March	Ruby, Cătălin	2 Bags of Potato Chips
20	7 March	Gina, Cătălin	Chocolate

== Statistics ==
Participate	Cătălin	Dorian	Ruby	Gina	Luminița	Andreea	Vladimir	Alina	Elena L.	Elena M.	Gabi	Mihai	Pacha
Tucker trials	5	13	7	5	1	3	3	3	1	2	0	1	0
Chest challenges	5	4	5	6	3	5	6	3	3	1	2	4	1
Total	10	17	12	11	4	8	9	6	4	3	2	5	1

== The Camp ==
For the show, celebrities live in jungle conditions in Kruger National Park, South Africa, with few creature comforts.

== Ratings ==
Official ratings are taken from ARMA (Asociaţia Română pentru Măsurarea Audienţelor), the organisation that compiles audience measurement and television ratings in Romania.

Episode	Original airdate	Timeslot (approx.)	Viewers (in millions)	Rank (Night)	Source	Week Avg.
1	16 February 2015	Monday 8:30 pm	2.53	#1		2.08
2	17 February 2015	Tuesday 8:30 pm	2.30	#1		2.08
3	18 February 2015	Wednesday 8:30 pm	2.12	#1		2.08
4	19 February 2015	Thursday 8:30 pm	2.07	#1		2.08
5	20 February 2015	Friday 8:30 pm	1.75	#1		2.08
6	21 February 2015	Saturday 8:30 pm	1.80	#1		2.08
7	22 February 2015	Sunday 8:30 pm	2.03	#1		2.08
8	23 February 2015	Monday 8:30 pm	2.35	#1		2.26
9	24 February 2015	Tuesday 8:30 pm	2.15	#1		2.26
10	25 February 2015	Wednesday 8:30 pm	2.17	#1		2.26
11	26 February 2015	Thursday 8:30 pm	2.27	#1		2.26
12	27 February 2015	Friday 8:30 pm	2.39	#1		2.26
13	28 February 2015	Saturday 8:30 pm	2.23	#1		2.26
14	1 March 2015	Sunday 8:30 pm	2.32	#1		2.26
15	2 March 2015	Monday 8:30 pm	2.26	#1		2.31
16	3 March 2015	Tuesday 8:30 pm	2.35	#1		2.31
17	4 March 2015	Wednesday 8:30 pm	2.18	#1		2.31
18	5 March 2015	Thursday 8:00 pm	2.14	#1		2.31
19	6 March 2015	Friday 8:30 pm	2.32	#1		2.31
20	7 March 2015	Saturday 8:30 pm	2.15	#1		2.31
21	8 March 2015	Sunday 8:30 pm	2.77	#1		2.31
