= Sunt celebru, scoate-mă de aici! season 2 =

Season 2 of a Romanian reality television series

Sunt celebru, scoate-mă de aici!
- Season 2
- Presented by: Cabral Ibacka and Adela Popescu
- No. of days: 26
- No. of contestants: 18
- Winner: Anisia Gafton
- Runner-up: Giani Kiriță
- Location: La Romana, Dominican Republic
- No. of episodes: 26

Release
- Original network: Pro TV
- Original release: 4 September – 24 November 2022

Season chronology
- ← Previous; Season 1

The second season of Sunt celebru, scoate-mă de aici! premiered on September 4, 2022, on Pro TV. Cabral Ibacka returned to host the series alongside Adela Popescu who took over hosting duties from Mihai Bobonete, who hosted the series for its first season. Filming for this season began in July 2022 in La Romana, Dominican Republic.

The line-up was announced on August 8, 2022, and consisted of 12 celebrities divided into two teams: Orange and Purple.

On Day 1 the camp was split in two - the Good camp and the Bad camp. Orange team consisted of Cristi, Giani, Lidia, Mara, Răzvan and Tania. Purple team consisted of Alex, Anisia, Bia, Cornel, Paul and Ruxi. Later Salvo (on Day 4), Ioana (on Day 13) and Roxana (on Day 19) joined Orange team, whereas Ami (on Day 4), Radu (on Day 13) and Levent (on Day 19) joined Purple team.

== Celebrities ==
Celebrity	Known for	Status
Anisia Gafton	Comedienne	Queen of the Jungle in episode 26
Giani Kiriță	Football player	Runner-up in episode 26
Levent Sali	Actor	Eliminated 16th in episode 26
Radu Vlăduț	Aerobic instructor	Eliminated 15th in episode 25
Cristi Mitrea	MMA fighter	Eliminated 14th in episode 24
Roxana Nemeș	Singer	Eliminated 13th in episode 23
Ami	Singer	Eliminated 12th in episode 22
Ioana Filimon	Model	Eliminated 11th in episode 20
Bia Khalifa	Adult content creator	Eliminated 10th in episode 18
Ruxi	Influencer	Eliminated 9th in episode 16
Tania Popa	Actress	Eliminated 8th in episode 14
Lidia Buble	Singer	Eliminated 7th in episode 12
Mara Bănică	Journalist	Eliminated 6th in episode 10
Alex Bogdan	Actor	Eliminated 5th in episode 10
Salvo Lo Castro	Chef	Eliminated 4th in episode 8
Răzvan Botezatu	Influencer	Eliminated 3rd in episode 8
Cornel Palade	Comedian	Eliminated 2nd in episode 6
Paul Diaconescu	Actor	Eliminated 1st in episode 3

== Results and elimination ==
#	Episode 3	Episode 6	Episode 8	Episode 10	Episode 12	Episode 14	Episode 16	Episode 18	Episode 20	Episode 22	Episode 23	Episode 24	Episode 25	Episode 26 (Finale)	
#	Episode 3	Episode 6	Episode 8	Episode 10	Episode 12	Episode 14	Episode 16	Episode 18	Episode 20	Episode 22	Episode 23	Episode 24	Episode 25	Round 1	Round 2
Anisia	Safe	Safe	Safe	Nominated	Safe	Safe	Nominated	Safe	Safe	Safe	Safe	Safe	Nominated	Safe	Winner; 63%
Giani	Safe	Nominated	Safe	Safe	Nominated	Safe	Nominated	Safe	Safe	Safe	Safe	Nominated	Safe	Safe	Runner-up (26)
Levent	-	-	-	-	-	-	-	-	Nominated	Safe	Nominated	Safe	Safe	3rd	Evicted (26)
Radu	-	-	-	-	-	Safe	Safe	Safe	Safe	Nominated	Nominated	Safe	Nominated	Evicted (Episode 25)	
Cristi	Safe	Nominated	Safe	Safe	Safe	Nominated	Safe	Safe	Safe	Nominated	Safe	Nominated	Evicted (Episode 24)		
Roxana	-	-	-	-	-	-	-	-	Safe	Safe	Nominated	Evicted (Episode 23)			
Ami	-	Safe	Safe	Safe	Safe	Safe	Safe	Safe	Nominated	Nominated	Evicted (Episode 22)				
Ioana	-	-	-	-	-	Safe	Safe	Safe	Nominated	Evicted (Episode 20)					
Bia	Nominated	Safe	Safe	Safe	Safe	Nominated	Safe	Walked	Evicted (Episode 18)						
Ruxi	Safe	Safe	Safe	Nominated	Nominated	Safe	Walked	Evicted (Episode 16)							
Tania	Safe	Safe	Safe	Safe	Safe	Nominated	Evicted (Episode 14)								
Lidia	Safe	Safe	Safe	Safe	Nominated	Evicted (Episode 12)									
Mara	Safe	Safe	Safe	Nominated	Evicted (Episode 10)										
Alex	Safe	Safe	Safe	Walked	Evicted (Episode 10)										
Salvo	-	Safe	Walked	Evicted (Episode 8)											
Răzvan	Nominated	Safe	Walked	Evicted (Episode 8)											
Cornel	Safe	Walked	Evicted (Episode 6)												
Paul	Nominated	Evicted (Episode 3)													
Nominated (named in)	Bia, Paul, Răzvan	Cornel, Cristi, Giani	None	Anisia, Mara, Ruxi	Giani, Lidia, Ruxi	Bia, Cristi, Tania	Anisia, Giani, Ruxi	None	Ami, Ioana, Levent	Ami, Cristi, Radu	Levent, Radu, Roxana	Cristi, Giani	Anisia, Radu	Anisia, Giani, Levent	Anisia, Giani
Withdrew	None	Cornel	Răzvan, Salvo	Alex	None		Ruxi	Bia	None						
Eliminated	Paul; Lost challenge	None	None	Mara; Lost challenge	Lidia; Lost challenge	Tania; Lost challenge	None	None	Ioana; Lost challenge	Ami; Lost challenge	Roxana; Lost challenge	Cristi; Lost challenge	Radu; Lost challenge	Levent; Fewest votes to save	Giani; Fewest votes to win
Eliminated	Paul; Lost challenge	None	None	Mara; Lost challenge	Lidia; Lost challenge	Tania; Lost challenge	None	None	Ioana; Lost challenge	Ami; Lost challenge	Roxana; Lost challenge	Cristi; Lost challenge	Radu; Lost challenge	Levent; Fewest votes to save	Anisia; Most votes to win

== Camp leaders ==
Captains			Original Run	
Week	Good camp Captain	Bad camp Captain	First episode	Last episode
1	Anisia Gafton	Mara Bănică	1	3
2	Răzvan Botezatu	Bia Khalifa	4	6
3	Alex Bogdan	Cristi Mitrea	7	8
4	Giani Kiriță	Bia Khalifa	9	10
5	Tania Popa	Anisia Gafton	11	12
6	Giani Kiriță	Ruxi	13	14
7	Bia Khalifa	Cristi Mitrea	15	16
8	Anisia Gafton	Giani Kiriță	17	18
9	Cristi Mitrea	Radu Vlăduț	19	20
10	Roxana Nemeș	Levent Sali	21	22
11	Cristi Mitrea	Radu Vlăduț	23	23
12	None		24	26

== Ratings ==
Official ratings are taken from ARMA (Asociaţia Română pentru Măsurarea Audienţelor), the organisation that compiles audience measurement and television ratings in Romania.

Episode	Original airdate	Timeslot (EET)	National				18–49			Source
Episode	Original airdate	Timeslot (EET)	Rank	Viewers (in thousands)	Rating (%)	Share (%)	Rank	Rating (%)	Share (%)	Source
1	September 4, 2022	Sunday, 20:00	#1	1 243	7.0	17.5	#2	7.0	21.5	
2	September 5, 2022	Monday, 20:30	#2	902	5.1	14.6	#2	4.4	15.5	
3	September 6, 2022	Tuesday, 20:30	#3	900	5.1	14.8	#2	4.2	15.5	
4	September 11, 2022	Sunday, 20:00	#1	—	5.9	18.5	#	—	—	
5	September 12, 2022	Sunday, 20:00	#2	—	3.2	11.0	#3	—	—	
