= ProTV Chișinău =

PRO TV Chișinău
- Country: Moldova
- Headquarters: 7 Petru Maior str., Chișinău, Moldova

Ownership
- Owner: Central European Media Enterprises
- Sister channels: Acasă, PRO Arena, PRO Cinema, Acasă Gold

History
- Launched: 1 december 1998 ; 28 years ago

Links
- Website: www.protv.md

2016–2017 logo.

PRO TV Chișinău is a private, generalist TV channel from Moldova. It was founded in 1 december 1998. It is operated by Prodigital SRL (initially - Mediapro SRL), part of CME trust. Besides some PRO TV Bucharest's programs, PRO TV Chișinău broadcasts local newscasts and shows, as well as local advertising.

PRO TV Chișinău is one of the first private stations in Moldova.

The company has been managed since it opened by Cătălin Giosan.

== History ==
The channel started broadcasting on 1 December 1998 as PRO TV Moldova, the station emulated its Romanian parent's aesthetic of westernizing society. It gained its current name on 1 december 1998, when the Moldovan edition of Știrile Pro TV premiered. A dedicated website was set up by Prodigital in 2007. The station's ownership was transferred from MediaPro SRL to Prodigital SRL in April 2010.

== News ==
PRO TV Chișinău broadcasts four news bulletins a day, Monday to Friday, two bulletins on Saturday and one newscast on Sunday.

At urban level, PRO TV Chișinău is the second most viewed channel.

PRO TV Chișinău was the only TV to cover live the April 2009 Moldovan parliamentary election protests, for international television stations. APTN took the satellite signal by PRO TV as its broadcast was attacked with stones. PRO TV Chișinău supplied news stories and pictures for TV stations across the world, mainly in Russia, Ukraine, Italy, the United Kingdom and the United States. PRO TV Chișinău reported live for PRO TV in Bucharest from Russia (as in case of Moscow theater hostage crisis in 2002).

== Programs ==
- înPROfunzime
- iSănătate
- O seară perfectă
- Gusturile se discută
- Știrile PRO TV Chișinău

== Logo changes ==
On 15 January 2016, PRO TV Chișinău changed to its monochrome logo, giving up the red-green-blue stripes.

On 28 August 2017, the MediaPro channels changed its logo, but PRO TV Chișinău kept the 2016 logo only for a day, the logo was changed August 29, 2017 to the current one.
