= Sunt celebru, scoate-mă de aici! =

Romanian reality game show

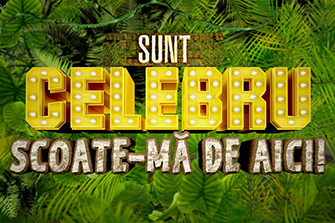
- Genre: Reality television
- Created by: Lifted Entertainment
- Presented by: Cabral Ibacka (Season 1-2); Mihai Bobonete (Season 1); Adela Popescu (Season 2); Oana Tache (Backstage Season 1)
- Country of origin: Romania
- Original language: Romanian
- No. of seasons: 2
- No. of episodes: 47

Production
- Production locations: Kruger National Park, South Africa (2015); La Romana, Dominican Republic (2022)
- Camera setup: Multiple-camera setup
- Running time: 93-133 mins
- Production companies: Pro TV; Rapid Blue (2015); Acun Medya Global, ITV Studios (2022)

Original release
- Network: Pro TV
- Release: 16 February 2015 – 24 November 2022

Related
- I'm a Celebrity...Get Me Out of Here!

Sunt celebru, scoate-mă de aici! is the Romanian version of the I'm a Celebrity...Get Me Out of Here! reality game show. The series premiered on February 16, 2015, on Pro TV. The first season was hosted by Cabral Ibacka and Mihai Bobonete. In season two, Adela Popescu takes over hosting duties from Bobonete.

The series sees celebrities living in the jungle with few creature comforts, and competing in various challenges to earn meals and other luxuries. They compete to be crowned king or queen of the jungle. The show is sponsored by Telekom Romania, a Romanian telecommunications company headquartered in Bucharest.

Season two of the series aired in 2022 after 7 years of absence.

== Format ==
The premise of the show is that there is a group of well known personalities living together in a specially constructed camp site in a jungle. During their time in the jungle they are isolated from the outside world and are not commonly aware of outside events. While in the jungle, some of the contestants (generally voted by the viewing public) compete in challenges for food and luxuries for the camp. These challenges often involve local wildlife and are meant to gross out the contestants. Each week one or more of the contestants are evicted from the jungle, based on viewer votes. In addition, if the contestants become overwhelmed by their situation they can leave the series by speaking the phrase "I'm a celebrity...get me out of here!". However, it is reported that if contestants do quit they will have their income for participating in the series markedly reduced. Throughout the show, additional contestants (called "intruders") enter the competition; and beginning with season two, some contestants are only included temporarily (i.e. having a guest appearance). In the end, a final viewer vote occurs to determine the winner of the series, who is given the title of "King or Queen of the Jungle".

== Production ==
The first season was broadcast daily on Pro TV channel at 8:30 pm, since 16 February 2015. The second season currently airs on Sundays at 8:00 and Mondays and Tuesdays at 8:30 pm.

=== Filming location ===
Camp locations in South Africa

Like the Australian versions until 2020, the first season of Romanian version was produced in Kruger National Park, South Africa. The second season was set on La Romana, Dominican Republic.

Camp locations in Dominican Republic

== Challenges ==
=== Tucker trials ===
Bush Tucker trials are used in the show to allow the contestants to gain food and treats for camp. Bush Tucker Trials take two formats: eating trials and physical/mental tasks.

In the eating trials, contestants are required to eat a variety of different "jungle" foods. Each dish successfully eaten will gain the contestants one star, which equals one meal for camp (although the number of meals per star can vary). The foods that are required to be eaten can include: crickets (in a variety of forms, such as cooked into biscuits, blended into drinks or eaten alive or dead), green ants, mealworms, witchetty grub, roasted spider or tarantulas, crocodile penis, cockroach (prepared in various ways such as being cooked into biscuits, blended into drinks, eaten alive or dead). Other past foods include beach worms, bull's tongues, the anus of various animals, vomit fruits, cooked pigs' brains, various animal testicles, raw fish eyes, sheep eyes, blended rats or mice tails.

The second type of challenge is more of a physical or mental task that requires the contestants to perform activities to gain stars. These can include searching through dung, going through tunnels, negotiating obstacles on high wires, or performing other tasks.

=== Celebrity Chest challenges ===
Two or more celebrities are chosen to take part in the "Celebrity Chest" challenge to win luxuries for camp. Each challenge involves completing a task to win a chest to take back to camp. However, to win the luxury item in the chest, the campmates must correctly answer a question. If they fail to answer correctly, the luxury item is forfeited and a joke prize is won.

== Series details ==
Winners are crowned King or Queen of their respective year.

Key:

King of the Jungle
Queen of the Jungle

Season	Start date	End date	Location	Days in camp	Campmates	Honour places		
Season	Start date	End date	Location	Days in camp	Campmates	Winner	Second place	Third place
1	16 February 2015	8 March 2015	Kruger National Park, South Africa	21	13	Cătălin Moroșanu	Dorian Popa	Claudia "Ruby" Grigore
2	4 September 2022	24 November 2022	La Romana, Dominican Republic	26	18	Anisia Gafton	Giani Kiriță	Levent Sali

== Ratings ==
Official ratings are taken from ARMA (Asociaţia Română pentru Măsurarea Audienţelor), the organisation that compiles audience measurement and television ratings in Romania.

Season	Episodes	Premiered		Ended		TV season	Rank	Viewers (in millions)
Season	Episodes	Date	Premiere viewers (in millions)	Date	Finale viewers (in millions)	TV season	Rank	Viewers (in millions)
1	21	February 16, 2015	2 530	March 8, 2015	2 770	2015	#3	2 220
2	26	September 4, 2022	1 243	November 24, 2022		2022		800

== Awards and nominations ==
Year	Award	Category	Result	Source
2015	Premiile TV Mania	Innovation Award	Won	
