= Esca =

Esca can refer to:

- Eurovision Song Contest Asia, an annual international song competition
- Esca (fish anatomy) or illicium, a modified luminescent fin ray found in anglerfish and frogfish
- Esca (grape disease)
- the Ezka, a river in the Basque country known as "Esca" in Spanish
- ESCA or Electron Spectroscopy for Chemical Analysis, now known as X-ray photoelectron spectroscopy (XPS)
- Andreea Esca (born 1972), Romanian journalist
