= Ioan Isaiu =

Romanian actor (1969–2026)

Ioan Isaiu (25 August 1969 – 9 May 2026) was a Romanian actor.

== Early life and career ==
Isaiu was born in Hunedoara on 25 August 1969. He graduated from the "Andrei Mureșanu" School in Dej. In 1995, he graduated from the Theater Department of the Faculty of Philology at Babeș-Bolyai University in Cluj.

After graduating, he became an actor at the Lucian Blaga National Theater in Cluj, where he worked between 1995 and 2001.

In the early 2000s, he left Romania and temporarily settled in New Zealand and later in Singapore, where he worked in the field of artistic management and event organization. During this period, he organized concerts for international artists such as Sting, Shakira and Kylie Minogue and promoted Romanian artists in Asia.

In the late 2000s, he returned to Romania and resumed his acting career, becoming known to the general public through his roles in series produced by Acasă TV and Pro TV.

== Personal life and death ==
Isaiu was married to television producer Nicoleta Ilie from 2007. He died from a heart attack on 9 May 2026, at the age of 56.
