= Plugaru =

Plugaru, Plugar are Romanian surnames literally meaning "ploughman".

- Alina Plugaru (born 1987), entrepreneur, former porn actress
- Anatol Plugaru (born 1951), politician
- Natalia Plugaru (born 1951), writer
