= Mugur Mihăescu =

Romanian actor and politician (born 1967)

Member of the Chamber of Deputies
- Incumbent
- Assumed office 21 December 2024
- Constituency: Olt County

Personal details
- Born: 2 June 1967 (age 59) Goicea, Dolj County, Romania
- Party: Alliance for the Union of Romanians
- Education: University of Craiova
- Occupation: Actor, screenwriter, and politician

Mugur Mihăescu (born 2 June 1967) is a Romanian actor and politician.

== Early days ==
Mihăescu was born in Goicea, Dolj County and is a graduate of the Faculty of Automation and Computers of the University of Craiova. He began his acting career in 1988 with the comedy group Vacanța Mare. Together with the band, he performed in various places in Romania. Since 1999, Vacanța Mare began making shows for Pro TV with "Pastila Timpului". Mihăescu starred in the films Garcea și oltenii, where he played two roles, and Trei frați de belea.

== Business ==
In 2010, Mihăescu purchased the management rights of the Muzica store in Bucharest for 1.7 million euros. In February of that year, Mihăescu together with Honorius Prigoană founded the company Rosal Development, in the field of civil and industrial construction abroad.

Mihăescu is the owner several bars in Bucharest's historic Old Town sector. He is married to Rodica.

== Political activity ==
In February 2011, Mihăescu was elected as the executive president of the Romanian Green Party, resigned in October of that year. In the 2024 local elections in Romania on 9 June, he ran for the presidency of the Olt County Council, representing the Alliance for the Union of Romanians party.

=== Member of the Chamber of Deputies (2024–present) ===
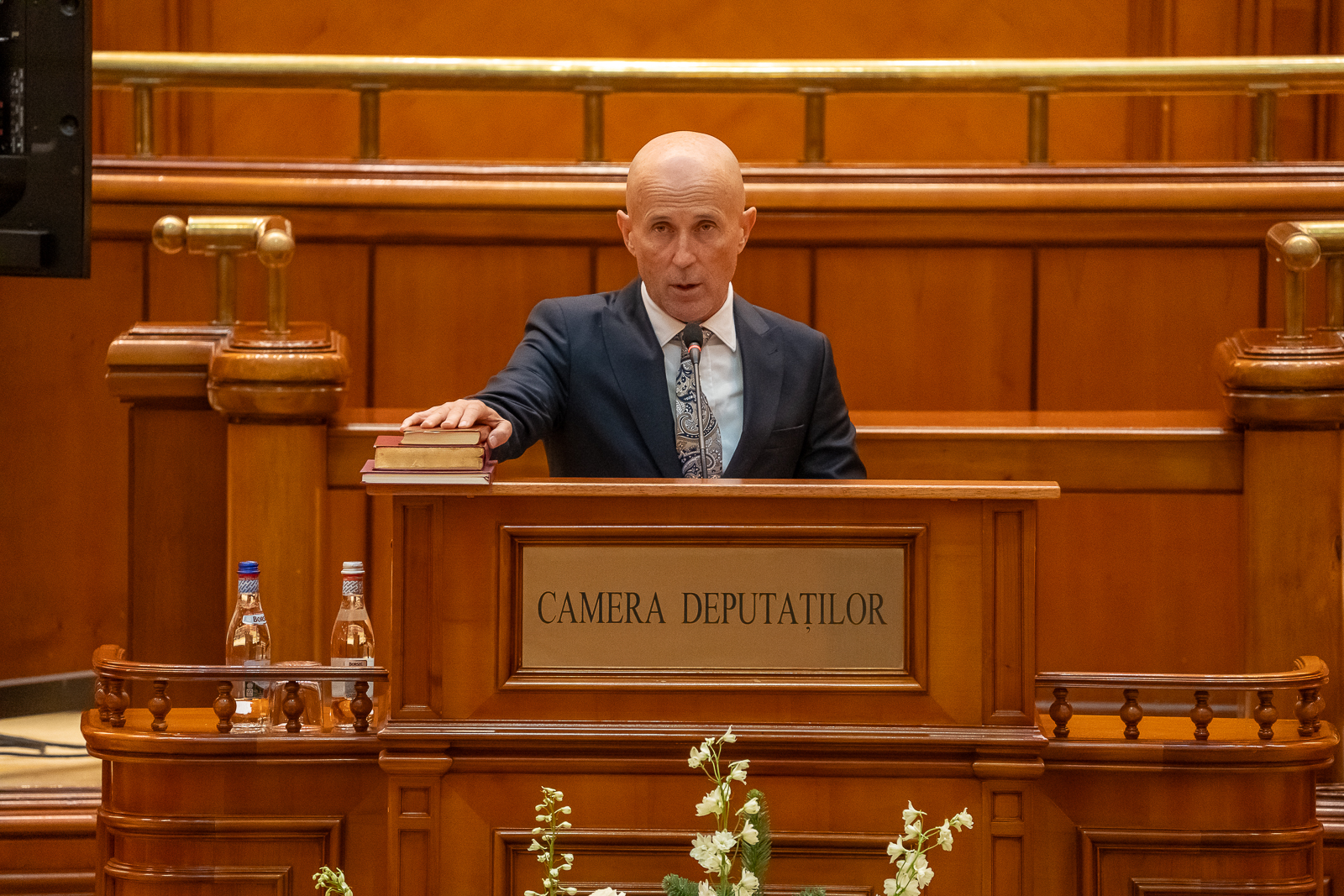
Mihăescu taking the oath of office on 21 December 2024

In the 2024 Romanian parliamentary election on 1 December, Mihăescu ran again for the AUR party and was elected a member of the Chamber of Deputies for Olt County, taking office on 21 December. He is part of the Parliament's Committee on Entrepreneurship and Tourism. Upon his election, Libertatea described Mihăescu as among the more "exotic personalities" of the new parliament.

A June 2025 review by Europa Liberă showned him to be one of 17 MPs to own properties in Bucharest or Ilfov County while also receiving rent payments from the state.

== Relation to the Securitate ==
On 30 November 2013, due to his status as a candidate for the mayoralty of Bucharest's Sector 5, Mihăescu was investigated by the National Council for the Study of Security Archives (CNSAS), in order to clarify his connections with the political security in communist Romania. CNSAS published the list of the people checked, and Mihăescu's name appears on this list, with the mention Military counterintelligence during the communist regime in Romania.

== See also ==
- Legislatura 2024-2028 (Camera Deputaților)
- Parliament of Romania
