= Pro TV Internațional =

Romanian international television channel

- Country: Romania
- Broadcast area: Worldwide

Programming
- Picture format: 16:9 (576i, SDTV)

Ownership
- Owner: PRO TV SRL
- Sister channels: Pro TV; Acasă TV; Pro Arena; Pro Cinema; Acasă Gold

History
- Launched: 1 December, 2000; 26 years ago

Links
- Website: www.protv.ro

Pro TV Internațional is a Romanian international television channel, owned by CME, which broadcasts the television programmes of Pro TV and its sister channels to Romanian audiences abroad in Romania, Moldova, Ukraine and Bulgaria.

In 2018, at the time of the renewal of its license, 44% of its programming consisted of productions from Pro TV, 52% from Romanian third-party producers and the remaining 4% made specifically for the channel (the folk television program Acasă la români).

== History ==
Pro TV Internațional started broadcasting on 1 december, 2000, coinciding with Easter. At the beginning, its schedule was limited to Pro TV's main in-house productions, such as the news, Question of the Day and The Great Vacation. Over time, the programming offer increased to feature, aside from original productions from the main channel, a selection of productions from Acasă, as well as producing its own programs. As of 2011, the channel was the second most-distributed European ethnic channel, behind Channel One Russia's international service.

Together with its sister channels, the channel adopted a uniform brand on August 28, 2017. For the first time in its history the logo matches the main Pro TV channel, adding the word INTERNAȚIONAL below. Before then, the logo was slightly different from the main channel.
