= Adrian Hădean =

Romanian chef

- Born: September 4, 1977 (age 49); Arad, Romania
- Website: www.adihadean.ro

Adrian Hădean (born 4 September 1977) is a Romanian chef. Hădean grew up in Baia Mare, a city in northern Romania, where began a career in cookery in 1998. He is best known for his culinary blog and his role as a judge on the cooking show MasterChef which began in 2014.

Across his career, Hădean has hosted a series of culinary shows and films such as Sare şi Piper at a local station in Baia Mare and Happy Cook in Oradea. In 2016 he began presenting a culinary radio show called Medium Rare. In 2015, he founded the Adi Hădean Association to promote Romanian cuisine and cooks.

In 2003, Hădean published his first book, Sare și piper (Salt and Pepper), followed in 2012 by a second book, Rețete pentru un Crăciun în familie (Recipes for a Family-Style Christmas). He has edited and translated several cookbooks into Romanian including 1000 Rețete. Deserturi (1000 Recipes: Desserts), and 1000 Rețete. Preparate rapide (1000 Recipes: Quick Meals). A 2016 book called 24 Centimetri was a biographical text that detailed running restaurants and cooking.

Hădean has engaged in several charitable endeavours.
