= Acasă =

Romanian television channel

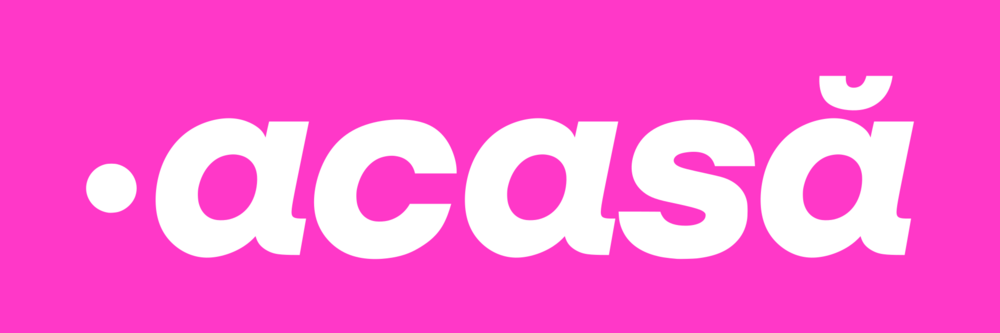
- Country: Romania
- Broadcast area: Nationally; also distributed in Moldova
- Headquarters: Bucharest, Romania

Programming
- Picture format: 16:9 (576i, SDTV); 1080i (HDTV)

Ownership
- Owner: Central European Media Enterprises
- Sister channels: Pro TV; Pro Arena; Pro Cinema; Acasă Gold; Pro TV Internațional

History
- Launched: 2 February 1998
- Former names: Pro 2 (2017–2022)

Links
- Website: acasatv.ro

Top: Former Acasă logo, used from 2016 to 2017.
Bottom: Logo of Acasă while known as Pro 2 (2017–2022)

Acasă (meaning "At home"), formerly known as Pro 2 between 2017 and 2022, is a Romanian television channel operated by Central European Media Enterprises. It is an entertainment station, primarily dedicated to daytime series, family movies, talk shows, soap operas, and news programs. Its sister is the television channel Acasă Gold that was launched on 15 April 2012; it airs reruns of the telenovelas that aired on Acasă and, especially, classical telenovelas, including some Pro TV shows.

On 7 March 2022, it was announced that Pro 2 will revert its name back to Acasă. The branding effect took place on 4 April 2022 at 07:00 EET.

== Acasă Gold ==
Acasă Gold
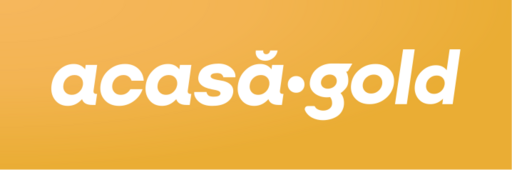
- Country: Romania
- Broadcast area: all of Romania
- Headquarters: Bucharest

Programming
- Picture format: 16:9 (576i, SDTV); 1080i (HDTV)

Ownership
- Owner: Central European Media Enterprises
- Sister channels: Pro TV; Pro Arena; Pro Cinema; Acasă TV; Pro TV Internațional

History
- Launched: 15 April 2012
- Former names: Pro Gold (2017–2022)

Links
- Website: acasatv.ro

Acasă Gold is a sister network of Acasă that focuses on classic archive programs, it was launched on 15 April 2012.

== Shows ==
Acasă mainly broadcast shows like:

- Poveștiri adevărate (2006–2014)
- Casa Ibacka (2013–2014)
- Doctorul casei (2013–2022)
- Poveștiri de Noapte (2007–2014)
- Dincolo de Poveștiri (2013-2019)
- CanCan TV (2012-2013)
- Știrile de Acasă (1998–2002)
- Muzica de Acasă (2001-2009)
- Rețeta de Acasă (2003-2012)
- Zodiacul de Acasă (2015–2016)
- Vremea de Acasă (1999-2011)
- Doamne de Poveste (2010-2013)
- Bazarul de Acasă (2024-present)
- Știi de Acasă (2024-present)
- Știrile Acasă Actualități (2024-present)
- Știrile Acasă Magazin (2024-present)
- Femeia alege (2021)
- Ferma după perdea (2018)
- MasterChef: Restul e plăcere (2022)
- Mâncare pe care (2022)
- Speak și Ștefania - Aventură, strigați: Ura! (2022)
- Survivor Extrashow (2022)
- Survivor România (2022)
- Vorbește lumea (2015-2016)

== Programming ==
=== Syndicated telenovelas ===
Year	Original Title	Country	Romanian Title
1992	Antonella	Argentina	Antonella
1992	Marielena	United States	Marielena
1996–1997	Nada personal	United States	Nimic personal
1997	Hombre de mar	Argentina	Omul mării
1993	Celeste siempre Celeste	Argentina	Celeste se întoarce
1985	María de nadie	Argentina	Maria
1989	La extraña dama	Argentina	Misterioasa doamnă
1992	Soy Gina	Argentina	Gina
1993–1994	Guadalupe	United States	Guadalupe
1997–1998	De corazón	Argentina	Din toată inima
1994	Marimar	Mexico	Marimar
1995–1996	María la del barrio	Mexico	Sărmana Maria
1995–1996	Lazos de amor	Mexico	Lanțurile iubirii
1995–1996	Sangue do Meu Sangue	Brazil	Sânge din sângele meu
1995–1996	Flor de oro	Colombia	Floare de aur
1996	Mujercitas	Venezuela	Micuțele doamne
1996	Amor sagrado	Argentina	Iubire sfântă
1996	El último verano	Argentina	Ultima vară
1996–1997	Te sigo amando	Mexico	Dragostea nu moare
1996–1997	Luz Clarita	Mexico	Luz Clarita
1996–1997	90-60-90 modelos	Argentina	90-60-90 fotomodele
1996–1997	O Rei do Gado	Brazil	Războiul pasiunilor
1997	Alguna vez tendremos alas	Mexico	Uneori avem aripi
1997–1998	Milady, la historia continúa	Argentina	Milady
1997–1998	María Isabel	Mexico	Maria Isabel
1997–1998	Por Amor	Brazil	Iubire fără limite
1998–1999	Muñeca brava	Argentina	Înger sălbatic
1998	La mentira	Mexico	Minciuna
1998	Preciosa	Mexico	Preciosa
1998–1999	Ángela	Mexico	Angela
1998–1999	La mujer de mi vida	United States; Venezuela	Femeia vieții mele
1998	Travesuras del corazón	Peru	Miracolul iubirii
1998–1999	Perro amor	Colombia	Amor de cățel
1999	Rosalinda	Mexico	Rosalinda
1999	Amor gitano	Mexico	Renzo și Adriana
1999	Por tu amor	Mexico	Pentru iubirea ta
1999–2000	Tres mujeres	Mexico	Trei femei
1999	El niño que vino del mar	Mexico	Copilul adus de mare
1999–2000	Cuento de Navidad	Mexico	Poveste de Crăciun
1999–2001	Yo soy Betty, la fea	Colombia	Betty cea urâtă
1999	Luisa Fernanda	Venezuela	Luisa Fernanda
1999–2000	Mujeres engañadas	Mexico	Femei înșelate
1999–2000	Terra Nostra	Brazil	Terra Nostra
2000	Ramona	Mexico	Ramona
2000	Locura de amor	Mexico	Dragoste nebună
2000–2001	Carita de ángel	Mexico	Îngerașul
2000–2001	Amantes de luna llena	Venezuela	Seducție
2000	Amor latino	Argentina	Amor latino
2000–2001	Pobre Diabla	Peru	Fiorella
2000–2001	Primer amor, a mil por hora	Mexico	Prima dragoste
1999–2000	Mariú	Venezuela	Mariú
2000–2001	Rayito de luz	Mexico	Rază de lumină
2000	A Muralha	Brazil	Cucerirea
2000–2001	Laços de Família	Brazil	Legături de familie
2001	El derecho de nacer	Mexico	Dreptul la viață
2001–2002	Salomé	Mexico	Salomé
2001	La intrusa	Mexico	Intrusa
2001–2002	Cuando seas mía	Mexico	Vei fi a mea, Paloma
2001	Ecomoda	Colombia	Ecomoda
2001–2002	El manantial	Mexico	Taina din adâncuri
2001	María Belén	Mexico	María Belén
2001	Sin pecado concebido	Mexico	Iubire fără de păcat
2001–2002	Secreto de amor	United States; Venezuela	Secretul iubirii
2001–2002	O Clone	Brazil	Clona
2001	Solterita y a la orden	Colombia	Singură și disponibilă
2002	Kachorra	Argentina	Kachorra, micuța impostoare
2002	Franco Buenaventura, el profe	Argentina	Profu'
2002	Entre el amor y el odio	Mexico	Între iubire și ură
1993–1994	Corazón salvaje	Mexico	Inimă sălbatică
2002–2003	¡Vivan los niños!	Mexico	Îngerașii
2002–2003	Las vías del amor	Mexico	Perla, cărările iubirii
2002–2003	Gata salvaje	United States; Venezuela	Pisica sălbatică
2002	Juana la virgen	Venezuela	Juana
2002	La otra	Mexico	Cealaltă femeie
2002–2003	La venganza	Colombia; United States	Răzbunarea
2002	Mi pequeña mamá	Colombia; United States	Micuța mea mamă
2003	Todo sobre Camila	Peru; Venezuela	Totul despre Camila
2002–2003	Mi gorda bella	Venezuela	Valentina, grăsuța mea frumoasă
2002	La duda	Mexico	Îndoiala
1998–1999	Luz María	Peru	Luz María
2003	Amor real	Mexico	Amor real
2003	Ladrón de corazones	Mexico; United States	Hoțul de inimi
2003	Niña amada mía	Mexico	Amazoana
2003–2004	Amor descarado	United States	Iubire cu două fețe
2003–2004	Mariana de la noche	Mexico	Îngerul nopții
2003	Pasión de Gavilanes	Colombia; United States	Jurământul
2003	A Casa das Sete Mulheres	Brazil	Șapte femei
2003–2004	Olá Pai	Portugal	Ola tati
2003–2004	Bajo la misma piel	Mexico	Suflete pereche
2004	Amar otra vez	Mexico	Să iubești din nou
2003	Mulheres Apaixonadas	Brazil	Femei îndrăgostite
2003	Morangos com Açúcar	Portugal	Căpșune cu zahăr
2003–2004	Ángel rebelde	United States; Venezuela	Înger rebel
2003–2004	Luciana y Nicolás	Peru	Luciana și Nicolas
2003–2004	Chocolate com Pimenta	Brazil	Ciocolată cu piper
2003–2004	Celebridade	Brazil	Celebritate
2004	Prisionera	Colombia; United States	Prizoniera
2004–2005	Mujer de madera	Mexico	Pădurea blestemată
2004	El deseo	Argentina	Dorința
2004	Estrambótica Anastasia	Venezuela	Extravaganta Anastasia
2004–2005	Gitanas	Mexico	Gitanas
2004	Rubí	Mexico	Rubi
2004	Amarte es mi pecado	Mexico	Iubirea mea, păcatul
2004–2005	Te voy a enseñar a querer	Colombia; United States	Te voi învăța să iubești
2004	Jesús, el heredero	Argentina	Jesus
2004–2005	Luna, la heredera	Colombia	Luna
2004	Da Cor do Pecado	Brazil	Culoarea păcatului
2004–2005	Anita, no te rajes	United States	Anita
2004–2005	Apuesta por un amor	Mexico	Pariul iubirii
2004–2005	Inocente de ti	Mexico; United States	Inocență furată
2004	Amy, la niña de la mochila azul	Mexico	Amy, fetița cu ghiozdanul albastru
2004–2005	Senhora do Destino	Brazil	Stăpâna destinului
2005	Piel de otoño	Mexico	Iubire târzie
2004–2006	Rebelde	Mexico	Rebelde
2005	La madrastra	Mexico	Mama vitregă
1998	La usurpadora	Mexico	Uzurpatoarea
2005	Amarte así	Argentina; United States	Micuțul Frijolito
2005–2006	El cuerpo del deseo	United States	Trupul dorit
2005	Contra viento y marea	Mexico	Împotriva destinului
2005	Los plateados	United States	Bandiții
2005–2006	Alborada	Mexico	Cântec de iubire
2005–2006	La Tormenta	Colombia; United States	La Tormenta
2005–2006	Peregrina	Mexico; United States	Peregrina
2005–2007	Soñar no cuesta nada	United States; Venezuela	Visuri fără preț
2005–2006	Amor a palos	Venezuela	Bărbatul visurilor mele
2005–2006	Corazón partido	Mexico; United States	Iubire de mamă
2005–2006	Olvidarte jamás	United States; Venezuela	Răzbunarea Victoriei
2005–2006	Belíssima	Brazil	Belissima
2006	Tierra de pasiones	United States	Tărâmul pasiunii
2006–2007	Sos mi vida	Argentina	SOS, viața mea!
2006–2007	Mundo de fieras	Mexico	O lume a fiarelor
2006	Heridas de amor	Mexico	Suflete rănite
2006	Duelo de pasiones	Mexico	Duelul pasiunilor
2006–2007	Amores de mercado	Colombia; United States	Iubiri
2006	Montecristo	Argentina	Montecristo
2006–2007	La viuda de Blanco	Colombia; United States	Văduva Blanco
2006–2007	Las dos caras de Ana	Mexico; United States	Cele două fețe ale Anei
2007	Acorralada	United States; Venezuela	Destine furate
2006–2007	Páginas da Vida	Brazil	Pagini de viață
2006–2007	Marina	Mexico; United States	Marina
2006–2007	En los tacones de Eva	Colombia	Pe tocurile Evei
2006	Sinhá Moça	Brazil	Micuța domnișoară
2006	Cobras & Lagartos	Brazil	Cuibul de vipere
2007	Amazônia, de Galvez a Chico Mendes	Brazil	Amazonia
2007	El Zorro, la espada y la rosa	Colombia; United States	Zorro
2007	Destilando amor	Mexico	Tequila cu suflet de femeie
2007	Patito feo	Argentina	Rățușca cea urâtă
2007–2008	Pasión	Mexico	Pasiune
2007	RBD: La familia	Mexico	RBD, familia
2007	Amor sin maquillaje	Mexico	Iubire fără machiaj
2007–2008	Victoria	Colombia; United States	Victoria
2007–2008	Nuevo rico, nuevo pobre	Colombia	Totul sau nimic
2007–2008	Madre Luna	Colombia; United States	Luna fermecată
2007–2008	Pura sangre	Colombia	Onoare și noblețe
2007–2008	Palabra de mujer	Mexico	Pe cuvânt de femeie
2007–2008	Pecados ajenos	United States	Umbrele trecutului
2007–2008	Tormenta en el paraíso	Mexico	Paradisul blestemat
2007–2008	Sete Pecados	Brazil	Șapte păcate
2008	La traición	Colombia; United States	Trădarea
2008–2009	Cuidado con el ángel	Mexico	Iubire cu chip rebel
2008	Las tontas no van al cielo	Mexico	Toantele nu merg în Rai
2008	Amanda O	Argentina	Amanda O
2008	Fuego en la sangre	Mexico	Focul iubirii
2008–2009	Valeria	United States; Venezuela	Valeria
2008–2009	Sin senos no hay paraíso	Colombia; Mexico; United States	Fără sâni nu există Paradis
2008–2009	Doña Bárbara	Colombia; United States	Doña Bárbara
2008–2009	En nombre del amor	Mexico	În numele iubirii
2008–2009	Mañana es para siempre	Mexico	Împreună pentru totdeauna
2008–2009	El Frostro de Analía	United States	Cealaltă față a Analiei
2008	El juramento	United States	Legământul
2009	Caminho das Índias	Brazil	India
2009–2010	Camaleones	Mexico	Cameleonii
2009	Sortilegio	Mexico	Predestinați
1992–1993	María Mercedes	Mexico	Maria Mercedes
2009–2010	Niños ricos, pobres padres	Colombia; United States	Săracii tineri bogați
2009–2010	Mar de amor	Mexico	O mare de pasiune
2009	Mi pecado	Mexico	Fructul oprit
1997	Esmeralda	Mexico	Esmeralda
2002–2003	Clase 406	Mexico	Clase 406
2009–2010	Más sabe el diablo	United States	Demon și înger
2010	¿Dónde está Elisa?	United States	Căutând-o pe Elisa
2010	Bella calamidades	Colombia	Suflet rătăcit
2010–2011	Teresa	Mexico	Teresa
2011	Los herederos del Monte	Colombia; United States	Moștenitorii
2008	Querida enemiga	Mexico	Impostoarea
1992–1993	Kassandra	Venezuela	Kassandra
2010–2011	Aurora	United States	Aurora
2009–2010	Corazón salvaje	Mexico	Inimă sălbatică
2011	Cielo rojo	Mexico	Sub cerul în flăcări
2010–2011	Triunfo del amor	Mexico	Triumful dragostei
2010	Soy tu dueña	Mexico	Stăpâna
2010	Perro amor	Colombia; United States	Jocul seducției
2011	Mi corazón insiste en Lola Volcán	United States	Lola
2000–2001	Abrázame muy fuerte	Mexico	Îmbrățișări pătimașe
2010–2011	Eva Luna	United States; Venezuela	Eva Luna
2010	El fantasma de Elena	United States	Iubire blestemată
2010–2011	Cuando me enamoro	Mexico	Secrete din trecut
2011–2012	La que no podía amar	Mexico	Suflet vândut
2011	La fuerza del destino	Mexico	Forța destinului
2012	Relaciones peligrosas	United States	Legături riscante
2011	Emperatriz	Mexico	Emperatriz
2011	Larin izbor	Croatia	Lara
2012	Un refugio para el amor	Mexico	Refugiul
2011	Dos hogares	Mexico	Dragoste la indigo
2012	Abismo de pasión	Mexico	Abisul pasiunii
2011	La reina del Sur	United States	Regina sudului
2012	Cachito de cielo	Mexico	Un colț de rai
2012	Amor bravío	Mexico	Dragoste și luptă
2011–2012	Corazón apasionado	United States; Venezuela	Patimile inimii
2012–2013	Rosa Diamante	United States	Rosa Diamante
2012–2013	Porque el amor manda	Mexico	Îți ordon să mă iubești!
2010	Yer Gök Aşk	Turkey	Intrigi și seducție
2012–2013	Qué bonito amor	Mexico	Que bonito amor
1999	Nunca te olvidaré	Mexico	Dragostea învinge
2012–2013	Amores verdaderos	Mexico	Iubiri vinovate
2013	Corazón indomable	Mexico	Maricruz
2012–2013	La otra cara del alma	Mexico	Suflet de gheață
2013	La patrona	United States	Diamantul nopții
2002	Winter Sonata (겨울 연가)	South Korea	Cântec de iarnă
2013	La tempestad	Mexico	Furtuna din adâncuri
2013	Mentir para vivir	Mexico	Viață de împrumut
2013–2014	Santa diabla	Mexico; United States	Santa Diabla
2013	Corona de lágrimas	Mexico	Cununa de lacrimi
2013	Dama y obrero	United States	Chemarea inimii
2013–2014	De que te quiero, te quiero	Mexico	Pentru că te iubesc
2013–2014	Marido en alquiler	United States	Soț de închiriat
2013–2014	Lo que la vida me robó	Mexico	Spune-mi că ești a mea
2011	La casa de al lado	United States	Casa de alături
2014	El color de la pasión	Mexico	Culorile iubirii
2013	Pasión prohibida	United States	Pasiune interzisă
2014	La impostora	United States	Complicea
2014	Reina de corazones	United States	Regina inimilor
2012	Corazón valiente	United States	Îngeri păzitori
2014	Las Bravo	Mexico	Las bravo
2013	Amor à Vida	Brazil	Dragoste de viață
2006	Sıla	Turkey	Puterea destinului
2013	Karagül	Turkey	Trandafirul negru
2014–2015	Los miserables	United States	Fugara
2014	En otra piel	United States	Suflet călător
2014	The Stray Cat	Mexico	Singură pe lume
2011	Kuzey Güney	Turkey	Inimă de frate
2005	Bitter Life	Turkey	Viață nedreaptă
2014	Tierra de reyes	United States	Tărâmul răzbunării
2013	Flor do Caribe	Brazil	Floarea din Caraibe
2013	Rosario	United States	Rosario
2013	Merhamet	Turkey	Iertare
2014	Corazón esmeralda	Venezuela	Vise de smarald
2013–2014	Saraswatichandra (सरस्वतीचन्द्र)	India	Sufletul meu pereche
2013	Bugünün Saraylısı	Turkey	Îngeri și nobili
2012	Avenida Brasil	Brazil	Avenida Brasil
2015–2016	Güllerin Savaşı	Turkey	Lupta rozelor
2014–2015	La sombra del pasado	Mexico	În umbra trecutului
2014–2015	Hasta el fin del mundo	Mexico	Până la capătul lumii
2013–2014	Tumhari Paakhi (तुम्हारी पाखी)	India	În așteptarea dragostei
2013–2014	Quiero amarte	Mexico	Intrigi în paradis
2016	Kış Güneşi	Turkey	Iarna răzbunării
2015	Kara Ekmek	Turkey	Vieți schimbate
2015	İlişki Durumu: Karışık	Turkey	Stadiul relației: Complicat
2015	Aşk Yeniden	Turkey	Dragoste cu împrumut
2014	Meri Aashiqui Tum Se Hi (मेरी आशिकी तुम से ही)	India	Totul pentru tine
2015	Kırgın Çiçekler	Turkey	Petale de singurătate
2014	Señora Acero	United States	Señora
2015–2016	Pasion Y Poder	Mexico	Pasiune şi putere
2015–2017	Kıralık Aşk	Turkey	Prețul dragostei
2016	Las Amazonas	Mexico	Amazoanele: Luptă pentru fericire
2015–2016	¿Quién Es Quién?	United States	Cine-i Cine?
2015–2016	Inadina Aşk	Turkey	Parola: Te Iubesc
2016–2017	Despertar Contigo	Mexico	Dimineți lângă tine
2015–2016	Tashan-e-Ishq (टशन-ए-इश्क़)	India	Inimi rătăcite
2016	Babam ve Ailesi	Turkey	Secrete în familie
2016–2017	Silvana Sin Lana	United States	Silvana
2016–2017	Kördüğüm	Turkey	Vieți la răscruce
2016–2017	Hayat Şarkısı	Turkey	În numele fericirii
2016	Eva La Trailera	United States	Destinul Evei
2013–2014	Do Dil Bandhe Ek Dori Se	India	E scris în stele
2016–2017	La Doña	Mexico	La Doña
2017	Enamorándome de Ramón	Mexico	Cum m-am îndrăgostit
2018	Always Been With You	United Kingdom	Întotdeauna a fost cu tine
2019	Bepannah	India	Umbre din trecut
2020	Kuzgun	Turkey	Între tine și rău

=== Original telenovelas ===
Year	Original title	English title	Starring
2004	Numai iubirea	Only Love	Corina Dănilă, Alexandru Papadopol
2005	Lacrimi de iubire	Tears of Love	Dan Bordeianu, Adela Popescu
2005	Păcatele Evei	The Sins of Eve	Alexandru Papadopol, Oana Zăvoranu
2006	Iubire ca în filme	A Movie-Like Romance	Dan Bordeianu, Adela Popescu
2006	Daria, iubirea mea	Daria, My Love	Victoria Răileanu, Adrian Ștefan
2007	Inimă de țigan	Gypsy Heart	Andreea Pătrașcu, Denis Ștefan
2007	Războiul sexelor	The War of the Sexes	Diana Dumitrescu, Alexandru Papadopol
2008	Regina	Regina	Bogdan Albulescu, Diana Dumitrescu
2008	Îngerașii	Little Angels	Ioan Isaiu, Adela Popescu
2008	Doctori de mame	Mothers and Doctors	Medeea Marinescu, Vlad Zamfiresu
2009	Aniela	Aniela	Mihai Petre, Adela Popescu
2010	Iubire și onoare	In the Name of Honour	Mădălina Drăghici, Radu Vâlcan
2013	Îngeri pierduți	Lost Angels	Diana Dumitrescu, Ioan Isaiu
2014	O nouă viață	A New Life	Cristina Ciobănașu, Vlad Gherman
