= Alina Plugaru =

Romanian pornographic film actress

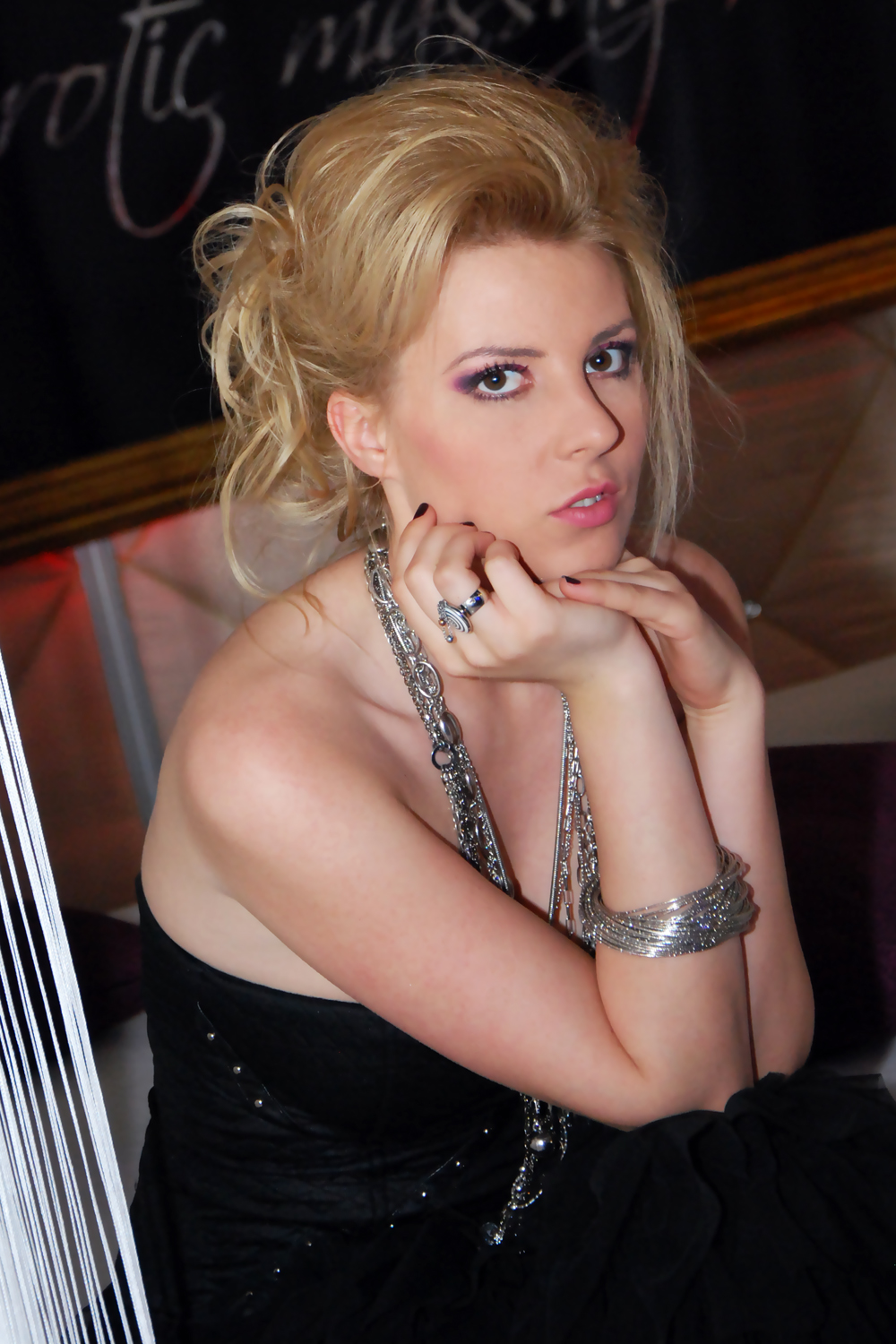
- Plugaru in 2011
- Born: Vaslui, Romania

Alina Plugaru is a Romanian entrepreneur and former pornographic film actress who has been called in Romania "The Queen of Porn". She started acting in erotic videos in 2006, after having worked as a stripper and model.

== Life and career ==
Plugaru was born in Vaslui, Romania. At the age of 15, Plugaru decided to pursue a career in modelling, and she moved to Bucharest. On the day she turned sixteen, she started working as an exotic dancer. She danced her way around the country for two years, gaining in popularity, until a visit to a porn set piqued her interest in a hardcore career. She started her porn career in 2006, just after her 18th birthday, with the porn star and director Zenza Raggi.

Plugaru appears regularly as a featured dancer in Romania and other countries. In the past few years, she has been a regular guest at the most important European erotic fairs, such as The Eros Show Bucharest, The Barcelona International Erotic Film Festival (FICEB), The Lisbon International Erotic Festival (SIEL), The Eros Porto, The Eros & Amore Vienna, and The Eros Show Sofia.

In recent years, she won the Best Romanian Porn Actress Awards at the Romanian Erotic Industry Awards (PIER 2008 & PIER 2009). Plugaru was recognised for her contributions to advancing the Romanian adult entertainment industry.

In March 2009, she was voted The Ideal Romanian Woman, and nearly a quarter (24.69%) of website visitors voted for her in an online poll.

On 24 September 2009, Plugaru announced her retirement from the adult film industry.

Plugaru founded the erotic dance troupe Erotic Dreams Show by Alina Plugaru in 2011 and she performs frequently with her erotic dance troupe at festivals, private parties and public venues. In May 2011, she received the Best Show Awards for her erotic dance troupe at the Romanian Erotic Industry Awards (PIER 2011).

After she retired from the adult film industry, she managed her business, one of the top-rated erotic massage parlour in Bucharest.

In 2015, Plugaru was a contestant in the PRO TV reality series Sunt celebru, scoate-mă de aici! (the Romanian version of I'm a Celebrity...Get Me Out of Here!). She was voted off the show after 16 days.

== Television ==
- Sunt celebru, scoate-mă de aici! (2015) Studio: Pro TV
- Nimeni nu-i perfect (2009) Studio: Prima TV
- Making Of (2007) Studio: Open Media Productions
- Secretul Mariei (2005) Studio: La Dolce Vita Productions & Antena 1 TV
