= Cârna =

- Commune
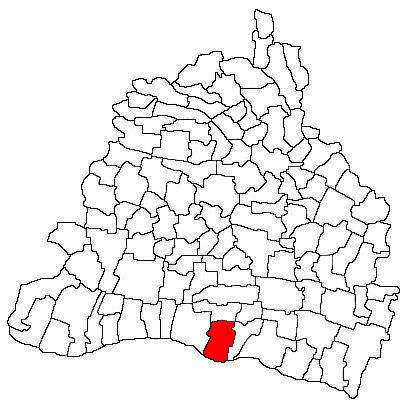
- Location in Dolj County

- Location in Romania
- Coordinates: 43°53′N 23°36′E
- Country: Romania
- County: Dolj
- Area: 29.23 km^{2} (11.29 sq mi)
- Population (2021-12-01): 1,110
  - Density: 38.0/km^{2} (98.4/sq mi)
- Time zone: UTC+02:00 (EET)
  - Summer (DST): UTC+03:00 (EEST)
- Vehicle reg.: DJ

Cârna is a commune in Dolj County, Oltenia, Romania with a population of 1,363 people in 2011. It is composed of a single village, Cârna, part of Goicea Commune until 2004, when it was split off.

== Natives ==
- Gheorghe Berceanu (1949–2022), light-flyweight Greco-Roman wrestler
