= Cătălin Moroșanu =

Romanian kickboxer (born 1984)

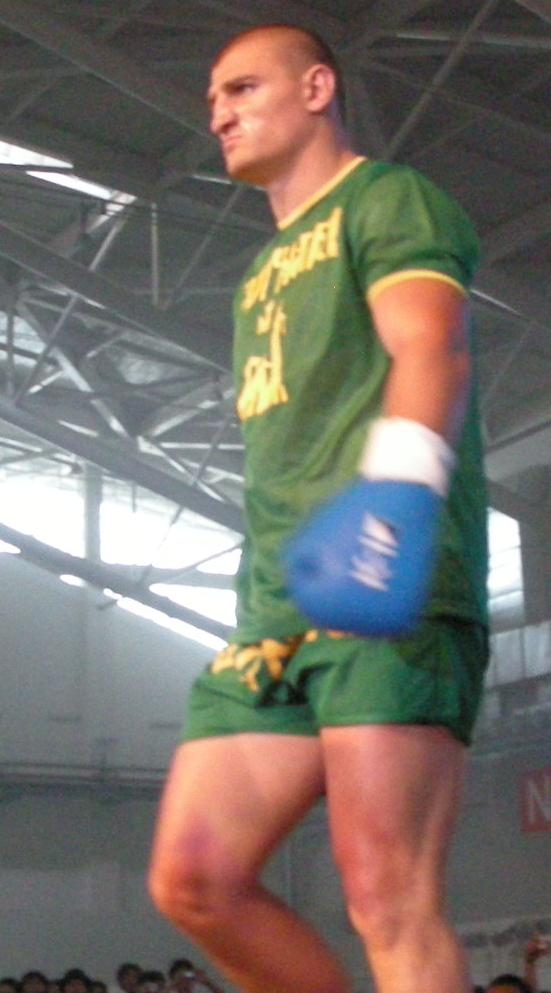
- Born: June 30, 1984 (age 42); Cotnari, Romania
- Other names: The Carpathian Death
- Nationality: Romanian
- Height: 1.82 m (6 ft 0 in)
- Weight: 102 kg (225 lb; 16.1 st)
- Division: Heavyweight
- Stance: Southpaw
- Fighting out of: Iaşi, Romania
- Team: Scorpions Iaşi
- Trainer: Mihai Constantin
- Years active: 2005–2019

Kickboxing record
- Total: 60
- Wins: 48
- By knockout: 28
- Losses: 12
- By knockout: 4
- Draws: 0
- Last updated on: June 6, 2019

Cătălin Moroșan (30 June 1984) is a retired Romanian kickboxer, chanbara practitioner and professional rugby player. He is best known for his time in the Superkombat Fighting Championship (SUPERKOMBAT), where he competed in the heavyweight division. Moroșanu also competed for Local Kombat, K-1, Glory and Dynamite Fighting Show. He is currently a politician and kickboxing promoter, serving as president of the Dynamite Fighting Show. He is the winner of season 9 of Romanian Dancing with the Stars and winner of I'm a Celebrity...Get Me Out of Here! Season 1.

He held notable victories in his career over Stefan Leko, Gary Goodridge, Mighty Mo, Carter Williams, Paul Slowinski, Freddy Kemayo and Anderson Silva. Moroșanu was considered to be slugger (brawler). Moroșanu still holds the record for longest winning streak in SUPERKOMBAT history with 17 consecutive wins. His streak, started in 2011, came to an end in controversial loss to Daniel Sam at SUPERKOMBAT World Grand Prix: Puerto Rico in 2016. In 2018, he was #10 contender in the world in official GLORY heavyweight rankings. And as of 6 June 2019, he is ranked the #12 heavyweight in the world by All The Best Fights. In 2017, Disney Pixar chose the kickboxer to provide the Romanian voice of a local from the animated movie Coco.

== Career ==
=== 2005–2007 ===
After a short career as a professional rugby player, Moroșanu began kickboxing professionally in 2005 and spent the majority of his early career competing in the Local Kombat promotion in his home country.

He made his K-1 debut on April 5, 2007, at K-1 Fighting Network Romania 2007 against Stefan Leko., and was handed the first defeat of his career by the German veteran as he lost via unanimous decision. Following this, he returned to Local Kombat to take three more wins, over Dimitry Podgaisky, Sergei Gur and Nicolas Vermont, by the end of the year.

=== 2008 ===
In 2008, Moroșanu was invited to take part in the K-1 European Grand Prix. The opening round was held at the K-1 World Grand Prix 2008 in Budapest Europe GP Final Elimination on February 9 where he was able to defeat Turkish fighter Erhan Deniz via unanimous decision after an extra round. In the quarter-finals at the K-1 World Grand Prix 2008 in Amsterdam on April 26, Moroșanu was knocked out with a knee strike by Frenchman Freddy Kemayo just seconds into the opening round.

Following a first-round knock out of Junichi Sawayashiki at the K-1 World Grand Prix 2008 in Taipei on July 13, Moroșanu rematched Kemayo on November 6 at Local Kombat 31 in Buzău, Romania. He was able to avenge his defeat by winning the match by unanimous decision.

He ended the year by defeating Trinidadian brawler Gary Goodridge in a match for the WKN Intercontinental Heavyweight Championship at Local Kombat 32 on December 12. After being dominated for most of the fight, Goodridge quit on his stool at the end of the second round.

=== 2009 ===
Moroșanu began 2009 with a fifty-eight-second knockout of Musab Gulsari at the K-1 Rules Tournament 2009 in Budapest on February 28. In his next match on 16 May at K-1 ColliZion 2009 Mladá Boleslav, he lost by another knee KO in an upset loss to Slovak Tomáš Kohout. He bounced back, however, by knocking out Wiesław Kwaśniewski in round one at K-1 ColliZion 2009 Sarajevo.

His KO wins then earned him a chance to compete in a superfight at the K-1 World Grand Prix 2009 in Seoul Final 16 on September 26, where he faced Japanese karate fighter Taiei Kin in a highly-controversial bout. Towards the end of the first round, the "clapper" (the device used to signal the remaining 10 seconds of the round) sounded. Moroșanu seemed to think the sound indicative of the ending of the round, and began walking towards his corner, only to be met by a punch from Kin (who was rightfully continuing in the context of the official rules regarding the fight). The end bell, signifying the officially sanctioned end of the round, sounded moments later. Moroșanu deliberately continued to fight, hitting Taiei (who was defenseless after dropping his hands at the end of the round) with a two punch flurry, knocking him unconscious. Moroșanu was disqualified from the fight, thus giving the victory to Taiei by means of disqualification.

The audience present at the show booed the decision awarding Taiei the victory. The crowd believed the punches to have been thrown before or exactly when the bell had sounded. However, video evidence refutes this.

He rebounded by beating Samoan-American slugger Mighty Mo in a close match at K-1 ColliZion 2009 Final Elimination on October 24. The bout was ruled a draw after three rounds, so an extra round was permitted to decide a winner, after which Moroșanu was ruled the victor by split decision.

=== 2010 ===
On February 6, Moroșanu defeated Deutsch Pu'u via technical knockout in the first round at the K-1 ColliZion MAX 2010 Europe GP in Budapest, Hungary. In his next bout, he faced Errol Zimmerman at the K-1 World Grand Prix 2010 in Bucharest on 21 May and lost via TKO in round one. Just twenty seconds into the round, Zimmerman rocked Moroșanu with a flying knee and right hook which forced the referee to stop the fight.

Following this, he picked up a unanimous decision win over Igor Mihaljević at a show in Sarajevo, Bosnia and Herzegovina on October 29. On November 27, he rematched Gary Goodridge at K-1 Scandinavia Rumble of the Kings 2010 in Stockholm, Sweden and was able to better "Big Daddy" once again as he won via TKO (referee stoppage) in the second round.

=== 2011 ===
In 2011, Moroșanu began competing regularly for the newly founded SuperKombat promotion. On March 18 at SuperKombat: The Pilot Show in Râmnicu Vâlcea, Romania, he took a unanimous decision victory over Yüksel Ayadin.

On June 16 at the SuperKombat World Grand Prix II 2011 in Constanța, Romania, he took revenge over Stefan Leko, the man who handed him his first career loss, winning by unanimous decision.

In October, he took another two decision victories in the space of two weeks by defeating Michael Andrade and Ibrahim Aarab at the SuperKombat World Grand Prix III 2011 and SuperKombat World Grand Prix IV 2011, respectively.

He was then expected to face Melvin Manhoef at the SuperKombat World Grand Prix Final 2011 on November 19, 2011, in Darmstadt, Germany. However, he fought Patrick Liedert instead. Moroșanu's reckless start to the fight allowed Liedert to knock him down twice early in the first round, but he was still able to make a comeback and KO'd the German on the bell at the end of round 1.

=== 2012 ===
On February 25, 2012, Moroșanu won the SuperKombat World Grand Prix I 2012, showing an improved kicking game and technical boxing skills. In the semi-finals, he knocked out Utley Meriana with a high kick in the second round, and in the final, he took a clear-cut unanimous decision win over Anderson "Braddock" Silva. The tournament win qualified him for the SuperKombat World Grand Prix Final 2012.

He faced Paul Slowinski at the K-1 World Grand Prix 2012 in Tokyo final 16 on October 14, 2012. He won via unanimous decision after sending the Pole to the canvas twice in round three.

He beat Carter Williams by unanimous decision on November 10, 2012, in Craiova, Romania in a non-tournament at the SuperKombat World Grand Prix 2012 Final Elimination.

=== 2013 ===
At the K-1 World Grand Prix FINAL in Zagreb on March 15, 2013, in Zagreb, Croatia, he faced Pavel Zhuravlev in the quarter-finals and lost by unanimous decision, bringing an end to his twelve-fight winning streak.

He TKO'd Eduardo Mendes in round one at SuperKombat World Grand Prix 10 in Craiova, Romania on May 18, 2013.

He challenged Ben Edwards for the vacant Kings of Kombat Heavyweight Championship at Kings of Kombat 10 in Melbourne, Australia on September 7, 2013, losing by majority decision in a fight where Moroșanu relied on his typical brawling style while Edwards utilized low kicks heavily throughout.

He scored a brutal first-round KO over Daniel Lentie the SuperKombat World Grand Prix 2013 Final Elimination in Ploiești, Romania on November 9, 2013.

=== 2014 ===
He defeated Mohamed Karim via unanimous decision at the SUPERKOMBAT World Grand Prix I 2014 in Reșița, Romania on April 12, 2014.

=== 2015 ===
In 2015 Cătălin Moroșanu won "Sunt Celebru Scoate-ma De Aici"

=== 2019 ===
==== Moroșanu vs. Ghiță ====
Cătălin Moroșanu and Daniel Ghiță will fight at Arena Națională in Bucharest, in a suggested Dynamite Fighting Show / Colosseum Tournament mixed event or in a neutral (Romanian) promotion event.

== Outside the ring ==
=== Personal life ===
Moroșanu is married and has one daughter. He holds a bachelor's degree in Law and also owns a kickboxing gym in his home country of Romania. A notably interesting fact about Moroșanu is that the K-1 promotion arbitrarily created the image of him as a crop farmer. In one of their promotional video-clips, Moroșanu appears driving an old tractor. In yet another clip from the company, Moroșanu appears to be drinking and promoting a brand of wine, which supposedly gives him super-hero like fighting powers. The wine is supposed to be, albeit fallaciously, his own signature line.

=== Television ===
From March 19 through May 7, 2010, Moroșanu participated in Dansez pentru tine (the local version of Dancing with the Stars). He stated that his motivation and financial winnings would go to support a young widow, who wanted to make her daughter's life easier, and filled with the happiness that she deserved but had lost with the death of her father. He made it to the final elimination round, and won the 1st place at the end of the show, earning 60,000 Euros for Magdalena Ciorobea (his dancing partner in the show), collecting over 13,000 votes.

On March 8, 2015, Moroșanu won the first series of Sunt celebru, scoate-mă de aici!, the Romanian version of I'm a Celebrity...Get Me Out of Here!.

=== Politics ===
Moroșanu is currently serving a term as a Iași County councilor. He has been elected in June 2012.

== Championships and accomplishments ==
=== Kickboxing ===
- Dynamite Fighting Show
  - Fight of the Night (One time) vs. Daniel Sam
- Superkombat Fighting Championship
  - SUPERKOMBAT World Grand Prix I 2012 Heavyweight Tournament Championship
  - Longest win streak in SUPERKOMBAT history (17)
  - Most wins in SUPERKOMBAT heavyweight division history (18)
  - 2014 Most Popular Fighter
  - 2011 Most Popular Fighter
- Local Kombat
  - 2010 Most Popular Fighter
- K-1
  - Fight of the Night (one time) vs. Paul Slowinski
- World Kickboxing Network
  - 2008 WKN Intercontinental Heavyweight Championship (One time)
- Kickboxing Romania Awards
  - 2024 Career Achievement Award

=== Chanbara ===
- Romanian Chanbara Federation
  - 2021 Romania Beach Chanbara Senior National Championship Choken Free Gold Medalist (gold)

== Kickboxing record ==
Kickboxing record
48 wins (28 KOs), 12 losses
Date	Result	Opponent	Event	Location	Method	Round	Time	Notes
June 6, 2019	Win	(United Kingdom) Daniel Sam	Dynamite Fighting Show 4	Cluj-Napoca, Romania	Decision (unanimous)	3	3:00	
December 14, 2018	Win	(Croatia) Ivo Ćuk	Dynamite Fighting Show 3	Craiova, Romania	KO (punches)	1	0:31	
October 19, 2018	Win	(Turkey) Mehmet Özer	Dynamite Fighting Show 2	Piatra Neamț, Romania	TKO	1	2:50	
July 5, 2018	Win	(France) Freddy Kemayo	Dynamite Fighting Show 1	Bucharest, Romania	Decision (unanimous)	3	3:00	
August 25, 2017	Loss	(Poland) Michał Turyński	Glory 44: Chicago	Hoffman Estates, Illinois, USA	Decision (split)	3	3:00	
May 6, 2017	Win	(Poland) Lukasz Krupadziorow	SUPERKOMBAT World Grand Prix II 2017	Madrid, Spain	Decision (unanimous)	3	3:00	
February 24, 2017	Win	(United States) Maurice Greene	Glory 38: Chicago	Hoffman Estates, Illinois, USA	TKO (referee stoppage/left hook)	2	0:23	
October 8, 2016	Loss	(Czech Republic) Ondřej Hutník	W5 Grand Prix "Legends in Prague"	Prague, The Czech Republic	Unanimous (decision)	3	3:00	
August 23, 2016	Loss	(Azerbaijan) Zabit Samedov	Akhmat Fight Show	Grozny, Russia	KO (right knee)	1	1:13	For the WBC Muaythai World Heavywheight Championship −104.50 kg.
March 26, 2016	Loss	(United Kingdom) Daniel Sam	SUPERKOMBAT World Grand Prix I 2016	San Juan, Puerto Rico	Decision (split)	3	3:00	
December 12, 2015	Win	(United States) Maurice Jackson	SUPERKOMBAT Special Edition Italy	Turin, Italy	DQ	1	—N/a	
October 2, 2015	Win	(Poland) Tomasz Czerwiński	SUPERKOMBAT World Grand Prix 2015 Final Elimination	Milan, Italy	KO (left hook)	1	2:55	
June 19, 2015	Win	(Netherlands) Colin George	SUPERKOMBAT World Grand Prix III 2015	Constanța, Romania	Decision (unanimous)	3	3:00	
September 27, 2014	Win	(Netherlands) Brian Douwes	SUPERKOMBAT World Grand Prix IV 2014	Almere, Netherlands	Decision (unanimous)	3	3:00	
August 2, 2014	Win	(Greece) Giannis Stoforidis	SUPERKOMBAT New Heroes 8	Constanța, Romania	KO (left hook)	2	2:26	
June 12, 2014	Loss	(Czech Republic) Tomáš Hron	Gibu Fight Night	Prague, Czech Republic	Decision (unanimous)	3	3:00	
April 12, 2014	Win	(Egypt) Mohamed Karim	SUPERKOMBAT World Grand Prix I 2014	Reșița, Romania	Decision (unnaimous)	3	3:00	
November 9, 2013	Win	(France) Daniel Lentie	SuperKombat World Grand Prix 2013 Final Elimination	Ploiești, Romania	KO (right hook)	1	2:20	
September 7, 2013	Loss	(Australia) Ben Edwards	Kings of Kombat 10	Melbourne	Decision (majority)	3	3:00	For Kings of Kombat Heavyweight title.
May 18, 2013	Win	(Portugal) Eduardo Mendes	SuperKombat World Grand Prix II 2013	Craiova, Romania	TKO (referee stoppage)	1	2:54	
March 15, 2013	Loss	(Ukraine) Pavel Zhuravlev	K-1 World Grand Prix FINAL in Zagreb	Zagreb, Croatia	Decision (unanimous)	3	3:00	K-1 quarter-finals.
November 10, 2012	Win	(United States) Carter Williams	SuperKombat World Grand Prix Final Elimination 2012	Craiova, Romania	Decision (unanimous)	3	3:00	
October 14, 2012	Win	(Australia) Paul Slowinski	K-1 World Grand Prix 2012 in Tokyo final 16	Tokyo, Japan	Decision (unanimous)	3	3:00	
July 7, 2012	Win	(United States) Rick Cheek	SuperKombat World Grand Prix III 2012	Varna, Bulgaria	TKO	2	1:53	
February 25, 2012	Win	(Brazil) Anderson Silva	SuperKombat World Grand Prix I 2012	Podgorica, Montenegro	Decision (unanimous)	3	3:00	SuperKombat World Grand Prix I 2012 final.
February 25, 2012	Win	(Netherlands) Utley Meriana	SuperKombat World Grand Prix I 2012	Podgorica, Montenegro	KO (left high kick)	2	0:56	SuperKombat World Grand Prix I 2012 semi-finals.
November 19, 2011	Win	(Germany) Patrick Liedert	SuperKombat World Grand Prix Final 2011	Darmstadt, Germany	KO (punches)	1	2:59	
October 14, 2011	Win	(Netherlands) Ibrahim Aarab	SuperKombat World Grand Prix IV 2011	Piatra Neamț, Romania	Decision (unanimous)	3	3:00	
October 1, 2011	Win	(Netherlands) Michael Andrade	SuperKombat World Grand Prix III 2011	Brăila, Romania	Decision (unanimous)	3	3:00	
July 16, 2011	Win	(Germany) Stefan Leko	SuperKombat World Grand Prix II 2011	Constanța, Romania	Decision (unanimous)	3	3:00	
March 18, 2011	Win	(France) Yüksel Ayaydın	SuperKombat: The Pilot Show	Râmnicu Vâlcea, Romania	Decision (unanimous)	3	3:00	
November 27, 2010	Win	(Canada) Gary Goodridge	K-1 Scandinavia Rumble of the Kings 2010	Stockholm, Sweden	TKO (referee stoppage)	2	2:24	
October 29, 2010	Win	(Croatia) Igor Mihaljević	Sarajevo Fight Night II	Sarajevo, Bosnia and Herzegovina	Decision (unanimous)	3	3:00	
May 21, 2010	Loss	(Netherlands) Errol Zimmerman	K-1 World Grand Prix 2010 in Bucharest	Bucharest, Romania	TKO (referee stoppage)	1	0:24	
February 6, 2010	Win	(United States) Deutsch Pu'u	K-1 ColliZion MAX 2010 Europe GP	Budapest, Hungary	TKO (referee stoppage)	1	-	
October 24, 2009	Win	(United States) Mighty Mo	K-1 ColliZion 2009 Final Elimination	Arad, Romania	Extra round decision (split)	4	3:00	
September 26, 2009	Loss	(Japan) Taiei Kin	K-1 World Grand Prix 2009 in Seoul Final 16	Seoul, South Korea	DQ (Kin KO'd after the bell)	1	3:00	
July 3, 2009	Win	(Poland) Wiesław Kwaśniewski	K-1 ColliZion 2009 Sarajevo	Sarajevo, Bosnia and Herzegovina	KO (liver punch)	1	1:20	
May 16, 2009	Loss	(Slovakia) Tomas Kohut	K-1 ColliZion 2009 Mlada Boleslav	Mlada Boleslav, Czech Republic	KO (knee)	3	-	
February 28, 2009	Win	(Turkey) Musap Gulsari	K-1 Rules Tournament 2009 in Budapest	Budapest, Hungary	KO (left hook)	1	0:58	
December 12, 2008	Win	(Canada) Gary Goodridge	Local Kombat 32	Ploiești, Romania	TKO (corner stoppage)	2	3:00	Wins WKN Intercontinental Heavyweight Championship.
November 6, 2008	Win	(France) Freddy Kemayo	Local Kombat 31	Buzău, Romania	Decision (unanimous)	3	3:00	
July 13, 2008	Win	(Japan) Junichi Sawayashiki	K-1 World Grand Prix 2008 in Taipei	Taipei, Taiwan	KO (left hook)	1	2:04	
April 26, 2008	Loss	(France) Freddy Kemayo	K-1 World Grand Prix 2008 in Amsterdam	Amsterdam, Netherlands	KO (knee)	1	0:35	2008 European Grand Prix quarter-final.
February 9, 2008	Win	(Turkey) Erhan Deniz	K-1 World Grand Prix 2008 in Budapest Europe GP Final Elimination	Budapest, Hungary	Extra round decision (unanimous)	4	3:00	2008 European Grand Prix opening round.
December 14, 2007	Win	(France) Nicolas Vermont	Local Kombat 28	Brașov, Romania	TKO	3	-	
November 3, 2007	Win	(Belarus) Sergei Gur	Local Kombat 27	Drobeta-Turnu Severin, Romania	Decision	3	3:00	
June 15, 2007	Win	(Belarus) Dimitry Podgaisky	Local Kombat 26	Iași, Romania	TKO	2	-	
April 5, 2007	Loss	(Germany) Stefan Leko	K-1 Fighting Network Romania 2007	Bucharest, Romania	Decision (unanimous)	3	3:00	
February 3, 2007	Win	(Netherlands) Omar Bellamar	Local Kombat 25	Sibiu, Romania	TKO	2	-	
December 16, 2006	Win	(Greece) Panayiotis Diakos	Local Kombat 24	Bucharest, Romania	KO	2	-	
November 5, 2006	Win	(Romania) Mihăiţă Golescu	Local Kombat 23	Râmnicu Vâlcea, Romania	Extra round decision	4	3:00	
Legend: Win Loss Draw/No contest

== See also ==
- List of male kickboxers
