= Goicea =

- Commune
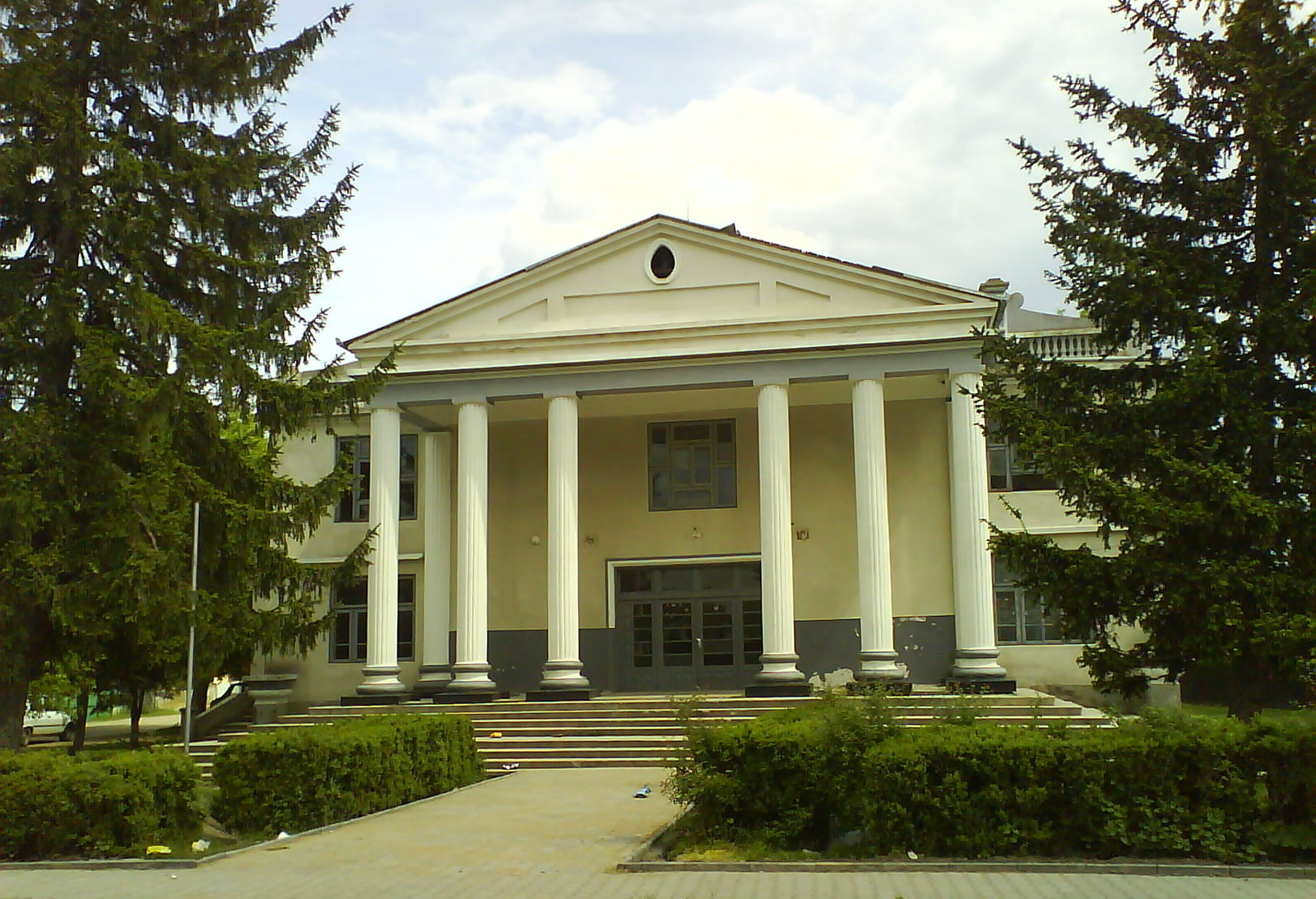
- The Cultural House

- Location in Romania
- Coordinates: 43°55′N 23°37′E
- Country: Romania
- County: Dolj
- Established: 1575 (first official record)

Government
  - Mayor (2024–2028): Cristian Mitroi (PNL)
- Area: 58.84 km^{2} (22.72 sq mi)
- Elevation: 40 m (130 ft)
- Population (2021-12-01): 2,354
  - Density: 40.01/km^{2} (103.6/sq mi)
- Time zone: UTC+02:00 (EET)
  - Summer (DST): UTC+03:00 (EEST)
- Postal code: 207305
- Area code: +(40) 251
- Vehicle reg.: DJ
- Website: www.comunagoicea.ro

Goicea is a commune in Dolj County, Oltenia, Romania. Its existence was first attested in 1575. It is composed of two villages, Dunăreni and Goicea. It also included the village of Cârna until 2004, when it was split off to form a separate commune.

== Natives ==
- Mugur Mihăescu (born 1967), actor and politician
