= Vacanța Mare =

Vacanța Mare (Romanian for "The Great Holiday" referring to the summer break), is a Romanian humour group. The group was established in 1988 by Dan Sava, Mugur Mihăescu and Radu Pietreanu. In 2007 the group is formed by Mihăescu, Pietreanu and Florin Axinte Petrescu, but also includes some co-workers: Iulian Frankfurt Ilinca, Emil Mitică Rădinoiu, Mirela Lila Stoian and George Romică Robu.

== The beginnings ==
Vacanța Mare was formed as a student hobby group in the late 1980s. At first the group was made up by five, but it was not very popular. After two members left the group, Vacanța Mare started to have shows by the seaside, especially during the summer holidays. In 1992, at a non-professional stand-up comedy contest, the group came in second for the "Burduful de Aur" award, where they were spotted by talent hunter Nicu Dragosin. He determined them to continue their stand-up comedy acts (they wanted to give up their routine at that point), while transforming them from amateurs into a professional group. Their first motto was Noi nu suntem normali (literally "We're not normal").

The group became famous and began staging 4 tours yearly: two national tours in spring and autumn and two at the seaside and sometimes in Bucharest. The three used to do parodies of songs, changing the lyrics and replacing them with political events sung alongside a guitar. The group made a signature entrance on stage, with a soundtrack based on "The Final Countdown" by Europe. Furthermore, their exit was always done on a remix of Floare de Iris of the Iris band and on the folk song Ţăranul e pe câmp (known in English as "The Farmer In The Town"), the spectators being invited to sing along. The show consisted from a series of 5-10 sketches and stand-up routines, 5–10 minutes each, followed by 5–30 minutes of song remixes playing satirizing a political or cultural event. Many of the sketches featured common Romanian regional or cultural stereotypes (such as the stupid policemen in Garcea, the stereotypical countryside fools, always drunk and fighting each other in Leana and Costel, or the not-so-successful thieves in Crapu and Menumorut).

== TV shows ==
After Dan Sava's death in 1999, the two remaining members continued to activate, in the autumn of 1999 the group started a weekly show on Pro TV. The shows had a running time of one hour, being aired at prime-time (8 PM). The rival TV station Antena 1 responded with a similar show from Divertis, a remarkably similar group, that inspired the formation of Vacanța Mare in the late 80s. The show format consisted of two parts - half an hour of comedic sketches such as Râdeți cu oameni ca noi, ("Laugh with the likes of us"), Spectacol Vacanța Mare, ("The Vacanţa Mare Show") and Stăpânii Manelelor, ("The Masters of Manele" - a pun on The Lord of the Rings translated in Romanian as Stăpânul Inelelor). This part of the show is somewhat similar to BBC's Little Britain show. The second half of the show it was reserved to a theatrical comedic series (Leana and Costel), featuring the life of their famous characters in the village of Sadova, Dolj.

A few years in the collaboration with Pro TV, the show started to lose audience, being moved to a later time segment (10 PM). However, the group made two movies: Garcea si oltenii (2001) and Trei fraţi de belea (2006). Both movies where heavily promoted by Media Pro Pictures, a subsidiary of the company that also owns Pro TV, and "Garcea și oltenii" grossed the highest box office figures for a Romanian movie after 1989 (almost 290.000 spectators viewed the movie in Romania).

At the beginning of 2007 the group left Pro TV for Kanal D for a salary of 300.000€.

== Characters ==
- The professor and his assistant - they were the main characters in their first comedy series "Pastila timpului" ("The time pill") which was the second half of their original PRO-TV show from 1999. The 2 characters would travel to a different time period every episode, get into trouble and barely escape using the "Time pill".
- Garcea - the stereotypical image of the Romanian traffic policeman, slow, stupid (he is barely literate) and always threatening people with his baton or with his ticket book.
- Leana and Costel - a peasant couple from Sadova, Dolj. Stereotypical rural idiots, with a stereotypical Oltenia accent, always drinking țuică and fighting each other, they get themselves in all kinds of troubles while trying different get-rich-quick schemes. Other well-known characters from the "Leana and Costel" series are their stupid fat son Axinte, their mentally slow and horny daughter Lila, their greedy neighbor Mitică, the inn-keeper Romică and Frankfurt, a local troublemaker and Lila's lover.
- Boier Moflea șii Voda - "Moflea the Noble and the King", an ironic image of a king in medieval Romania and a member of the aristocracy. They would often debate and find ridiculous solutions to several problems of the kingdom. Moflea had a trademark upper-lip. Another well-known character of the series was Gheorghe the Peasant, who represented a satire of the medieval Romanian peasant.
- Crapu and Menumorut - two fairly idiotic thieves, of gypsy ethnicity, performing robberies with varying degrees of (in)success around the world.
- Istvan Kopefalagyi "Pisti" - an ironic image of a member of the Hungarian minority in Romania. He would always complain that he was being mistreated.

== Cultural Influence ==
The group had an important influence amongst the Romanian public - a traffic policeman is commonly referred to as "Garcea", while some of their tag lines became common phrases in the urban vocabulary (such as iezista o esplicatie - a grammatically incorrect form of există o explicație - "There is an explanation" for a stereotypical explanation). Also, a Hungarian is commonly referred to as "Pishty", a Magyar character played by Mugur.

== Shows ==
- Nișite țărani, Some peasants (1994)
- Lecția de umor, The humor lesson (1994)
- Noi nu suntem normali, We are not sane (1994)
- Toate dânsele sus, All ladies up (a pun on Toate pânzele sus - "Sails up!") (1995)
- Beatman Forever, Drunk man Forever (a pun on Batman Forever) (1995)
- Proştii Caritasului, The Caritas Idiots (1995)
- Toamna mitocanilor, Jerks' autumn (1995)
- Go West, Go West (1996)
- Te uiți și privești, Watch and Look (a pun on Pro TV's famous slogan Te uiți și câștigi - "Watch and Win") (1996)
- Sex O'Clock, Sex O'Clock (1996)
- Sticla cu trei capace, The bottle with 3 caps (1996)
- Vampiri în izmene, Vampires in tights (1996)
- Mănăstirea de taici, The Male Nun Monastery (note that Romanian has a proper term for monks, the term "taici" used in this context meaning mostly old men) (1997)
- Tânăr și ne-a liniștit, The young and the rested (a pun on The Young and the Restless) (1997)
- Căruța cu proști, The cart with idiots (1997)
- Am îmbuli-NATO, We've been screwed by NATO (1997)
- Proasta norocului, The Silly of Fortune (a pun on the popular game show The Wheel of Fortune) (1998)
- Un saxofon la Casa Albă, A Saxophone at The White House (1998)
- Salutări din balamuc, Greetings from the lunatic asylum (1998)
- Ce-lularul meu, My Mo-bile, a pun on a Romanian curse saying (1998)
- Necenzurat, Uncensored (originally named "3 Proşti din Sud-Vest", "3 Stupids form South-West", the last show with Dan Sava, 1999)
- Ţapra cu 3 iliezi, The "Ţapra" with 3 iliezi (it was supposed to be held in 1999, but it was canceled due to Dan Sava's death - a tape was released with parts of the recorded footage during rehearsals.Both "țapra" and "ilied" have no meaning in Romanian, țapră being a portmanteau of capră (goat doe) and ţap (goat buck - as a reference to/popular nickname of romanian president at the time Emil Constantinescu) whereas ilied is a portmanteau of ied, the offspring of a goat and Ion Iliescu. The name of the show is a wordplay on Capra cu Trei Iezi, a famous fairy tale by Ion Creangă).
- Cu oltenii la eclipsă, Watching the eclipse with a bunch of Oltenians (1999)
- Românu și Spaniolu, The Romanian and the Spaniard (1999)
