= Dan Bordeianu =

Romanian actor and singer (born 1975)

- Born: 23 October 1975 (age 50); Bucharest, Romania
- Occupations: actor & singer

Dan Bordeianu (Romanian pronunciation: [ˈdan bordeˈjanu]; born 23 October 1975) is a Romanian actor and occasional singer, mostly known for his parts in telenovelas.

== Career ==
His first part came when he was 11, in the movie "Promisiuni", starring Mircea Diaconu and Ion Caramitru.

In Romania, he became a familiar face after starring in the 2004–2005 soap-opera "Numai iubirea", produced by MediaPro Pictures, playing the troubled, yet good-hearted brother of main star Alexandru Papadopol. The show brought a high-profile romance with co-star Adela Popescu. MediaPro Pictures capitalised on their real-life relationship by producing two one-season soap-operas, Lacrimi de iubire and Iubire ca în filme, in 2005–2006 and 2006–2007, respectively, where the two also share their love on-screen. This fueled rumours that their relationship is actually a publicity stunt. As of 21 March 2007, they were no longer a couple.

He also had minor parts in the movies "Modigliani" and "Gunpowder, Treason & Plot", both filmed on location in Romania.

He also played the part of Vlad Dracula's teenage son in the movie Dark Prince: The True Story of Dracula.
