= MasterChef România =

- Directed by: Marius Toader, Monica Senchiu - Media Factory (4-6), Mona Segal (1-3)
- Presented by: Răzvan Fodor (1-6) No Host (7-8) Gina Pistol (9)
- Judges: Radu Dumitrescu (8) Cosmin Tudoran (7) Silviu Chelaru (7) Joseph Hadad (7-8) Răzvan Exarhu (6) Samuel le Torriellec (6) Liviu Popescu (6) Patrizia Paglieri (4-5) Florin Scripcă "FOA" (4-5, 8) Adrian Hădean (4-5) Cătălin Scărlătescu (1-3, 9) Sorin Bontea (1-3, 9) Florin Dumitrescu (1-3, 9)
- Theme music composer: Katy Perry
- Opening theme: Hot n Cold (only in the second season)
- Country of origin: Romania
- Original language: Romanian
- No. of seasons: 9
- No. of episodes: 207 aired

Production
- Running time: 120 minutes (season 1-6, 8) 60 minutes (season 7) 180 minutes (season 9)
- Production companies: FremantleMedia (2012-2013); Shine Group (2014); Endemol Shine Group (2015-2019); Banijay (2022-present)

Original release
- Network: Pro TV
- Release: 20 March 2012 – 11 December 2024

MasterChef Romania is the Romanian version of the television cooking game show, open to amateur and home chefs. The first series started in March 2012 and was broadcast by Pro TV channel in Romania. The show was hosted by Romanian actor Răzvan Fodor. The panel was completed by Cătălin Scărlătescu, Sorin Bontea and Florin Dumitrescu. They were replaced in season 4 by Patrizia Paglieri, Adrian Hădean and Florin Scripcă Starting with the 6th Season, the MasterChef panel has been replaced by chefs Răzvan Exarhu, Samuel le Torriellec and Liviu Popescu. Seventh season had the panel was once again replaced by Joseph Hadad, Cosmin Tudoran and Silviu Chelaru, former participant of the show.

== Challenges ==
Of all the amateur chefs who audition nationwide, one hundred are chosen to cook their signature dish for the three judges. Each judge takes a taste of the dish and gives his opinion before voting a "yes" or a "no". At least two "yes" votes are required to earn a white MasterChef apron, allowing the competitor to advance.

In the Mystery Box challenge, contestants receive a number of ingredients of which they are to make a dish of their choice. The contestants are allowed to use any number of the ingredients they wish, and are free to leave any ingredients out. Once the dishes are finished, the judges choose three of the dishes to taste. The winner receives an advantage in the following elimination challenge.

The off-site team challenge involves the contestants being split into two teams, blue and red, which consist of equal numbers and are given a task, for example, running a restaurant or catering for a party or wedding. After the task has been completed, the teams are given the results, which can be determined by third party votes. Members of the losing team compete in an elimination challenge.

A "pressure test" challenge involves competitors who failed in a previous challenge (i.e. the three worst performers in an individual challenge or the losing team in a group challenge). The competitors are given a dish that they then must create in a particular time frame. Once the contestants have finished cooking, the dishes are taken to the judges to be tasted, who then criticize, vote and eliminate one or more contestants.

== Seasons ==
=== Series summary ===
Season	Season premiere Date	Season finale Date	No. of Finalists	No of Episodes	Winner	Runner-up	Judges	Presenter
1	20 March 2012	6 June 2012	21	13	Petru Buiucă	Mimi Nicolae	Cătălin Scărlătescu; Sorin Bontea; Florin Dumitrescu	Răzvan Fodor
2	5 March 2013	28 May 2013	24	14	Aida Parascan	Alex Hora	Cătălin Scărlătescu; Sorin Bontea; Florin Dumitrescu	Răzvan Fodor
3	18 March 2014	10 June 2014	22	13	Jesica Zamfir	Irina Bucșă	Cătălin Scărlătescu; Sorin Bontea; Florin Dumitrescu	Răzvan Fodor
4	15 September 2014	23 December 2014	24	25	Ciprian Ogarcă	Odette Mândruță	Patrizia Paglieri; Adrian Hădean; Florin Scripcă	Răzvan Fodor
5	14 September 2015	14 December 2015	24	26	Andrei Voica	Liviu Balint	Patrizia Paglieri; Adrian Hădean; Florin Scripcă	Răzvan Fodor
6	13 February 2017	15 May 2017	24	16	Robert Petrescu	Ana Demian	Răzvan Exarhu; Samuel le Torriellec; Liviu Popescu	Răzvan Fodor
7	9 September 2019	14 November 2019	18	39	Alina Gologan	Cezar Marin	Joseph Hadad; Silviu Chelaru; Cosmin Tudoran	No host
8	12 January 2022	2 June 2022	14	26	Gabriela Dima	Marco Genna	Joseph Hadad; Radu Dumitrescu; Florin Scripcă	No host
9	10 September 2024	11 December 2024	20	27			Cătălin Scărlătescu; Sorin Bontea; Florin Dumitrescu	Gina Pistol
10	8 September 2025	16 December 2025		5			Cătălin Scărlătescu; Sorin Bontea; Florin Dumitrescu	Gina Pistol

=== Overview ===
The first episode aired on 20 March 2012. The winner was 23-year-old office manager, Petru Buiucă, who defeated Mimi Nicolae in the grand final. Buiucă received a cheque of 50,000 euros.

The second season started on 5 March 2013. The grand prize was won by Aida Parascan, a housewife that lives with her family in Italy, but came especially back to Romania to take part at the show. The prize remained the same, 50,000 euros.

The third season started on 18 March 2014.

The fourth season started on 15 September 2014. The winner of this season was announced on 23 December 2014 and is Ciprian Ogarcă.

The fifth season started on 14 September 2015. The winner of this season was announced on 14 December 2015 and is Andrei Voica.

The sixth season was on air in spring 2017. The winner of this season is Robert Petrescu.
