= Pro Cinema =

- Country: Romania
- Broadcast area: Romania and internationally online
- Headquarters: Bucharest

Programming
- Picture format: 16:9 (576i, SDTV/1080i, HDTV)

Ownership
- Owner: Central European Media Enterprises
- Sister channels: Pro TV; Acasă TV; Pro Arena; Acasă Gold; Pro TV International

History
- Launched: 19 April 2004; 21 years ago

Links
- Website: www.procinema.ro

Availability

Terrestrial
- Romania: Channel 754

Pro Cinema (Romanian pronunciation: [ˌprot͡ʃineˈma]) is a Romanian movie channel that launched on April 19, 2004. It is owned by Central European Media Enterprises. It was the first Romanian TV channel dedicated exclusively to movies, and as such it attracted a significant audience from its very inception, mainly in the 21-54 urban demographic. Contrary to most indigenous channels, Pro Cinema aired a wide array of movies, ranging from Romanian and international classics to recent American blockbusters. The channel introduced popular contemporary series such as The Sopranos, Monk, Alarm für Cobra 11, Two and a Half Men or The Shield, but also aired older sitcoms such as Seinfeld (currently aired by Pro Arena) and Friends, which were formerly broadcast by Pro TV. Pro Cinema also aired shows such as Saturday Night Live and various documentaries featuring famous actors and directors.

From January 2015, Pro Cinema broadcasts only movies, while the series and the documentaries were moved to other sister channels (mostly, they were moved to Acasă Gold).

== Logos ==
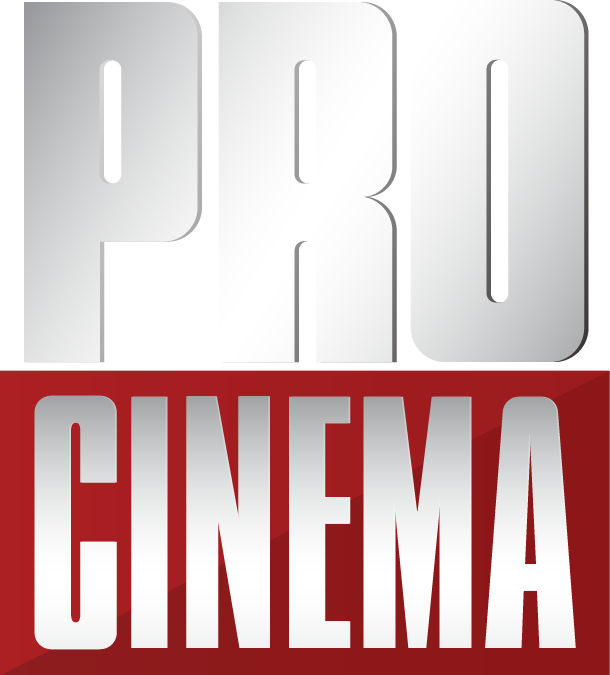
19 April 2014–28 August 2017

28 August 2017–18 April 2022
