= Răzvan Fodor =

Romanian actor and singer

Fodor Răzvan
- Born: 22 June 1975 (age 50); Bucharest, Romania
- Occupations: Actor, Singer
- Website: http://razvan-fodor.blogspot.com/2013/06/bun-venit-la-site-ul-web-de-razvan-fodor.html

Răzvan Fodor (Romanian pronunciation: [rəzˈvan floˈrin ˈfodor]) is a Romanian singer and actor, and TV personality. He was born on 22 June 1975, in Bucharest, Romania. He was the lead singer for the Romanian rock group Krypton (also spelled Kripton) from 2000 to 2006, as well as being a well-known actor on Romanian television.

== About ==
Răzvan Fodor studied at the Academia de Educatie Fizica si Sport, specializing in [gymnastics].

Fodor is a regular on Romanian TV, especially in Romanian soap operas such as Pacatele Evei in which he played the role of Alex Damian. He also had a minor role in the film Milionari de weekend in 2004 starring Romanian actress Catalin Saizescu. He has since been on other Romanian TV programs such as Daria, iubirea mea (2006) and Om sarac, om bogat (2006)

In 2000, Fodor joined the former Romanian rock band Krypton. Formed in 1983, Krypton was more noted for its heavy metal style of rock. With Fodor on vocals, the band shifted from heavy metal to a more rock/pop orientation. The result was immediate commercial success in the Romanian music market. The CD album Comercial, released in 2001, featured the video hits Inima mea (My heart), Spune-mi cu ce am gresit (Tell me what I did wrong), and Iti mai aduci aminte (Do you remember?). In 2002, Krypton released their second CD album to feature Fodor on vocals, Stresat de timp (Streets of time). A video for the song Cerceii tai (Your earrings) from that album was released in June 2002 and received extensive airplay via MTV Romania.

In 2004, Krypton signed with Cat Music/Media Services and released their third album with Fodor in December entitled Deasupra Lumii. By the beginning of 2005, Lasa-mi speranta (Give me hope), the first video release from the album, became an immediate hit in Romania and Europe. Fodor was given notice by the European music community for his lead vocals for the song. "Lasa-mi speranta" became an MTV European favorite during 2005.

SpotlightNews reported that Fodor was once engaged to marry famous Romanian model, Catrinel Menghia, but according to the website she married ex-football player Massimo Brambati in Milan in the fall of 2005.

According to Monden Info, Fodor left Krypton in November 2005 to form a new band ("Fodor renunta la Krypton si isi face trupa noua") as well as to enhance his acting career, especially in Romanian television soap operas (called "novelas".)

Fodor will appear in the upcoming Romanian movie #selfie due out in September 2016. He also was chosen to provide the voice of narrator in the Romanian translation of the animated movie The Grinch.

== Discography ==
=== CD / Albums ===
| 2001 | Comercial (2001) KRYPTON (with Fodor) |
| 2001 | 1 Ieri - azi - Maine (Yesterday, today, tomorrow) 3:19 |
| 2001 | 2 Inima mea (My heart) 3:19 |
| 2001 | 3 Fetele cu ochii verzi (Girl with green eyes) 3:09 |
| 2001 | 4 Din cauza ta 3:14 |
| 2001 | 5 Sa nu ma certi 3:29 |
| 2001 | 6 Spune-mi cu ce am gresit (What did I say wrong?) 3:23 |
| 2001 | 7 Iti mai aduci aminte (Do you remember?) 3:24 |
| 2001 | 8 Furtuna din pahar 3:09 |
| 2001 | 9 Am uitat cum arati 3:12 |
| 2001 | 10 O zi, o noapte 3:27 |
| 2002 | Stresat de timp (2002) KRYPTON (with Fodor) |
| 2002 | 1 Cerceii tai (Your earrings) 4:04 |
| 2002 | 2 Fara raspuns 3:23 |
| 2002 | 3 Rebel 3:27 |
| 2002 | 4 Fata de la autostop 3:33 |
| 2002 | 5 Am uitat cum arati 3:07 |
| 2002 | 6 Am dansat cu norii (I danced in the sky) 3:31 |
| 2002 | 7 Vorbele tale 3:12 |
| 2002 | 8 Esti o tipa bine 3:57 |
| 2002 | 9 Stresat de timp (Streets of time) 3:55 |
| 2002 | 10 Ce vraji mi-ai facut? 2:51 |
| 2004 | Deasupra Lumii (December 2004) |
| 2004 | 1. Cea Mai Dulce (My sweet woman) |
| 2004 | 2. Lasa-mi speranta (Give me hope) |
| 2004 | 3. Lasa-ma sa-ti spun (Let me tell you) |
| 2004 | 4. Urme de parfum (Traces of perfume) |
| 2004 | 5. Lumea noastra (Our world) |
| 2004 | 6. Final de vis (The end of the dream) |
| 2004 | 7. Undeva... (Somewhere) |
| 2004 | 8. Lasa-mi speranta (remix) |
| 2004 | 9. Furtuna in sufletul meu (Torment in my soul) |
| 2004 | 10. Iti mai aduci aminte (remix) |
| 2006 | Din iubure Vol 2 (2006) |
| 2006 | 6 Pacatele Evei (with Lili Sandu) 4:04 |
| 2007 | Raoul Russu - Am atins un nor (2007) |
| 2007 | 3 Vise de fum (Dreams of smoke) 3:56 |

=== Video Singles ===
- Inima Mea (2001) (KRYPTON)
- Spune-mi cu ce am gresit (2001) (KRYPTON)
- Iti mai aduci aminte (2001) (KRYPTON)
- Cerceii Tai (June 2002) (KRYPTON)
- Am dansat cu norii (2002) (KRYPTON)
- Lasa-mi speranta (2005) (KRYPTON)
- Pacatele Evei (with Lili Sandu) (2006)
- Vise de fum (2007)
- Furtuna in sufletul meu (2007) (with KRYPTON)
- Vad iubire (2010)

=== Music Singles ===
- Inima Mea (2001) (KRYPTON)
- Spune-mi cu ce am gresit (2001) (KRYPTON)
- Iti mai aduci aminte (2001) (KRYPTON)
- Cerceii Tai (June 2002) (KRYPTON)
- Am dansat cu norii (2002) (KRYPTON)
- Lasa-mi speranta (2005) (KRYPTON)
- Pacatele Evei (with Lili Sandu) (2006)
- Vise de fum (2007)
- Vad iubire (2010)
- Ceva bun (Paula Seling & Razvan Fodor) (2013)

=== Filmography ===
- Milionari de weekend (2004) Romanian Movie - character: Vasi
- Daria, iubirea mea (2006) Romanian TV Series - character: Tavi Dumitrescu
- Om sarac, om bogat (2006) Romanian TV Series - character: Banderas
- Pacatele Evei (2006) Romanian TV Series
- Ingerasii (2008) Romanian TV Series
- Aniela (2009) Romanian TV Series - character: Zeno Vulturesco
- MasterChef România (2012) TV Show MasterChef România (season 1) - Presenter / Host
- Pariu cu viața (sezon 3) (2012) - Robert Calin
