= Pro Arena =

- Country: Romania
- Broadcast area: Romania
- Network: Pro TV

Ownership
- Owner: Pro TV SRL (Central European Media Enterprises)
- Sister channels: Pro TV; Pro Cinema; Pro TV International; Acasă; Acasă Gold

History
- Launched: July 27, 2003 (TV Sport); June 1, 2007 (Sport.ro); August 28, 2017 (Pro X); April 4, 2022 (Pro Arena)
- Closed: June 1, 2007 (TV Sport); August 28, 2017 (Sport.ro); April 4, 2022 (Pro X)
- Former names: TV Sport (2003–2007); Sport.ro (2007–2017); Pro X (2017–2022)

Links
- Website: www.proarena.ro

Pro Arena (formerly TV Sport, Sport.ro and Pro X) is a Romanian TV channel that airs programming intended for a male audience, including sports transmissions. Its headquarters are located in Bucharest and it is owned by Pro TV SRL (Central European Media Enterprises). It was launched on July 27, 2003, as TV Sport, by the businessman Silviu Prigoană. In March 2007, it was sold to PRO TV SRL. On June 1, 2007, during the chrildren's international day, it changed its mame to Sport.ro. As part of the rebranding, it changed its name to PRO X on August 28, 2017.

On March 7, 2022, it was announced that Pro X will change its name to Pro Arena. The branding effect was on April 4, 2022 at 06:00 EET.

== Programming ==
- Football
  - UEFA Europa League (until 2024)
  - UEFA Europa Conference League (until 2024)
  - FA Cup (until 2027)
- Handball
  - Romania men's national handball team (until 2026)
  - Romania women's national handball team (until 2026)
  - Liga Națională (men's) (until 2026)
  - Liga Națională (women's) (until 2026)

- Kickboxing
  - Glory
  - Dynamite Fighting Show
  - Golden Fighter Championship
- Mixed Martial Arts
  - UFC
