= Andreea Esca =

Romanian television journalist

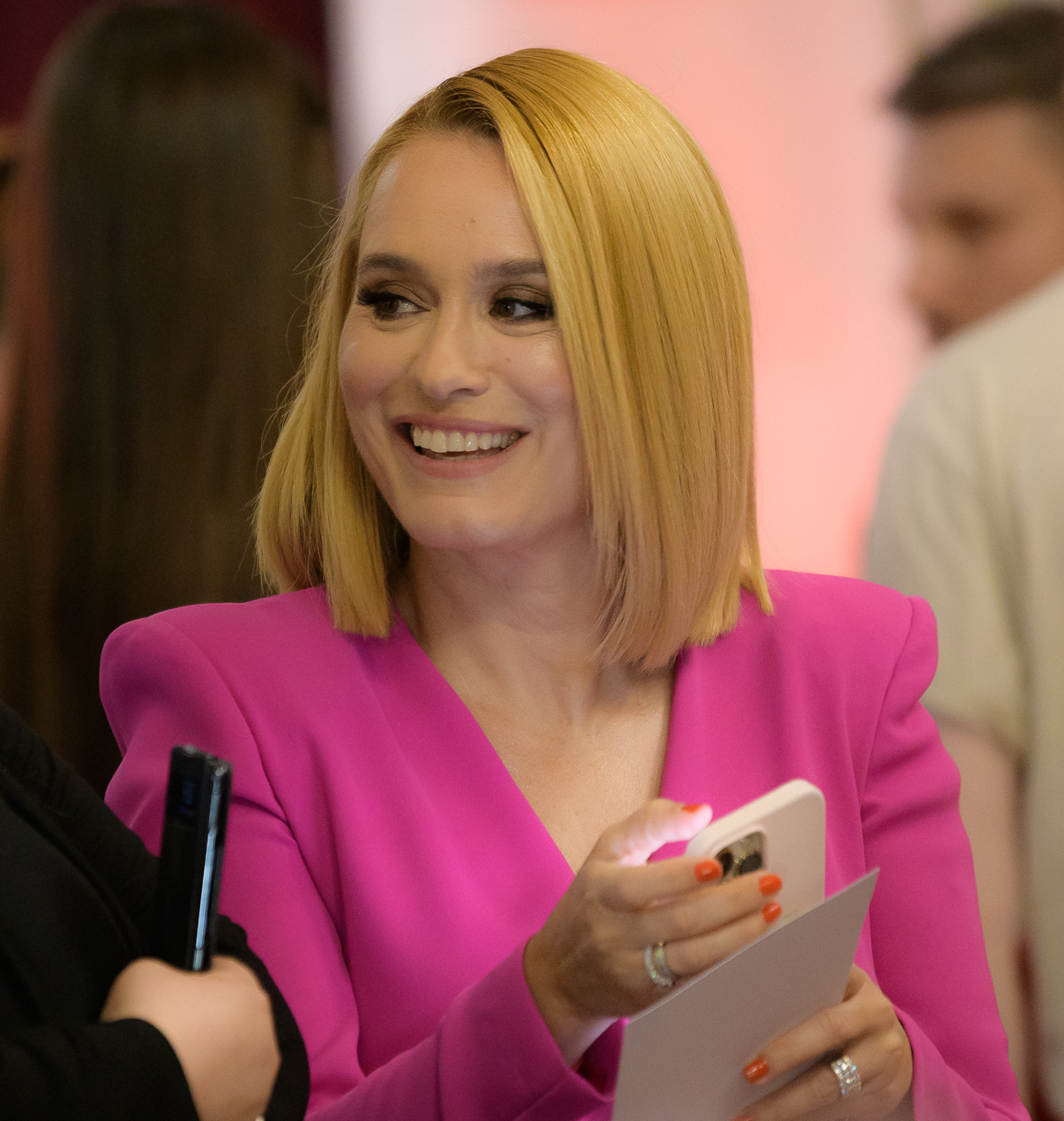
- Esca at the 2023 Transilvania International Film Festival
- Born: Andreea Ioana Esca; 29 August 1972 (age 53); Bucharest, Romania
- Citizenship: Romanian
- Education: Superior School of Journalism (SSJ)
- Occupation: Journalist
- Years active: 1992–present
- Employer: Pro TV
- Spouse: Alexandre Eram (m. 2000)
- Children: 2
- Website: www.protv.ro

Andreea Ioana Esca Eram (née Esca, Romanian pronunciation: [anˈdree̯a iˈo̯ana ˈeska]; born 29 August 1972) is a Romanian television journalist and a prominent figure in Romanian media. She has been working for Pro TV since December 1995 and also hosts "La Radio", a program broadcast on Radio Europa FM.

Esca graduated from a journalism school in 1990 and later trained at CNN in the United States. She has been a news presenter at Pro TV since its launch in 1995, a role she continues to hold. In 2002, she was honored with the National Audiovisual Council's "Woman of the Year" award. She is also a member of the "CNN World Report" team. In 2014, she published her memoir "Ce-am făcut când am tăcut" (What I Did While I Was Silent), written in Romanian.

== Biography ==
Esca was born on 29 August 1972 in Bucharest, Socialist Republic of Romania, the only child of Dumitru and Lucia Esca. She studied at the Superior School of Journalism (Școala Superioară de Jurnalism) and later completed professional training at the Center for Independent Journalism in Prague, CNN in Atlanta, United States, and in Athens, Greece.

She began her career in television in January 1992 at the independent station SOTI TV, where she worked as a reporter and news presenter. Esca joined Pro TV on 1 December 1995, presenting the channel’s inaugural broadcast. Since the channel's launch, she has regularly presented Știrile ProTV at 19:00, with occasional breaks for maternity leave and vacation.

In September 2018, she was made a Knight of the French National Order of Merit by the French ambassador to Romania, Michèle Ramis.

== Personal life ==
In April 2000, she married American-born businessman Alexandre Douglas Eram, who is of French and Armenian background. They have two children, Alexia (born 2000) and Aris (born 2003), who are both influencers.

== Publications ==
- Esca, Andreea (2002). Bună seara România, bună seara București! (in Romanian). Editura Fundației Pro. ISBN 978-9-7385-4705-6.
- Esca, Andreea (2014). Ce-am făcut când am tăcut (in Romanian). Editura Humanitas. ISBN 978-9-7350-4428-2.
