= Pro TV =

Romanian free-to-air television network

PRO TV
- PRO TV logo since 2017
- Country: Romania; Moldova
- Network: Pro TV
- Headquarters: Bucharest, Romania

Programming
- Languages: Romanian; English (subtitles only)
- Picture format: 1080i HDTV

Ownership
- Owner: PRO TV SRL through Central European Media Enterprises (CME) owned by PPF Group
- Sister channels: Acasă TV; PRO Arena; PRO Cinema; Acasă Gold; PRO TV Internațional

History
- Launched: 11 March 1994; 32 years ago
- Replaced: Canal 31 (1993–1995)

Links
- Website: protv.ro

PRO TV (Romanian pronunciation: [pro teˈve], often stylized as PRO•TV since 2017) is a Romanian free-to-air television network, launched on 11 march 1994 as the fourth private TV channel in the country (after TV SOTI, Antena 1, and the now-defunct, but online Tele7ABC). It is owned by CME (Central European Media Enterprises), which is owned by PPF Group.

Since 1 december 1998 company has also been broadcasting its own signal for the Republic of Moldova, under the Pro TV Chișinău brand. It broadcasts, in addition to Pro TV Bucharest programs (according to its own grid, different from the Romanian one), a series of local news and programs and its own advertising slots throughout the day.

Targeting urban adults aged 21 to 54, Pro TV uses a programming strategy of top international series and movies, as well as a wide variety of local productions including news programming, local entertainment and local fiction.

On 29 August 2014, Pro TV launched its own streaming service, called Pro TV Plus, dedicated to original series. Later, in 2021, it was replaced by Voyo^{(Romanian)}, which has the same series and original shows of the Pro channels, plus some other exclusives and original content.

Since 2014, the idents for commercials and promos have become more different from those of other stations, focusing on the stars appearing in the station's shows. During the summer, idents are used that present activities that are practiced in the summer, while in the winter, idents are used that present things and activities related to the winter holidays, but also things related to winter.

== History ==
Pro TV dates back to the creation of a UHF channel in Bucharest, Canal 31, in June 1993. Its founder, Adrian Sârbu, received the license to operate as a sports channel and, in 1994 11 march, found a foreign partner (CME) in order to launch the channel on a national scale as Pro TV.

Pro TV was the fourth private television channel in Romania to be modelled on Western-style (Western European and American) principles. The channel brought viewers to the streets, introduced Valentine's Day to Romania and launched a line of local celebrities. Among its remarkable innovations was a series of lottery-style programs under the name Te uiţi şi câştigi (You Watch and Win), presented by Florin Călinescu. One such event was held on the day of the 1996 Romanian general election, in which the station offered television sets to urban voters, in contrast to TVR's offer of tractors in areas of high rural turnout. There was a mystery grand prize for viewers who sent their proof of vote.

Regional broadcasts from its twelve stations stopped on 1 April 2018 as a business decision. From that day, the news produced in Bucharest was the only one seen nationwide. Regional news teams continued their activities.

== Programs ==
The station's local productions include entertainment shows, news programs and TV series.

Program name	English name	Summary
Știrile Pro TV	Pro TV News	A news program, highly followed by Romanian audiences, with clear leadership numbers. In 2008, Știrile Pro TV won the International Emmy Awards.
Ce spun românii	Family Feud	The Romanian version of the Family Feud franchise. The show is presented by Cabral Ibacka.
Românii au talent	Romania's Got Talent	The Romanian version of the Got Talent franchise. The show is presented by Smiley and Pavel Bartoș.
Vocea României	The Voice of Romania	The Romanian version of The Voice franchise.
Las Fierbinți	The Hotties	A Romanian sitcom set in a rural place. The series follows the social and romantic lives of the village's inhabitants.
Batem palma?	Make a deal?	The Romanian version of Deal or No Deal.
România, te iubesc!	Romania, I Love You	A current affairs program that features 6 reporters who show the beauty of the country and some special people who make Romania better. The reporters also make documentaries and investigations to reveal local illegalities, which the authorities fix under public pressure.
I like IT	N/A	A TV programme featuring technology and IT news, as well as computer games and robots. The programme's host are Iulia Ionescu and Marian Andrei.
Doctor de bine	Doctor for good	A programme dealing with health problems, nutrition, maintaining health and self-care strategies. The programme is presented by Mihaela Bilic.
Apropo TV	N/A	An entertainment programme presented by Andi Moisescu discussing social themes, popular culture and local/worldwide ads.
MasterChef România	MasterChef Romania	The Romanian version of the MasterChef franchise.
Lecṭii de viață	Life lessons	An antalogic drama series that presents dramatic situations that happen in many people's life.
Desafio: Aventura	Desafio: The adventure	An adventure-game show with 3 teams: Visatorii (the dreamers), Norocosii (the lucky's) and Luptatorii (the battlers). The show is presented by Daniel Pavel.

== Știrile Pro TV ==
Știrile Pro TV (English: Pro TV News) is one of the most popular news programs in Romania, with an average rating of 9.3 points and 25.1% market share, being watched by over a million urban viewers. According to 2022 report of Reuters Institute for the Study of Journalism, 76% of the interviewed persons confirmed that Pro TV news are the most trusted ones. According to different research studies, Pro TV has at this moment a reach of 63% in terms of weekly use, 51% of the people watching the programs at least three times per week.

Știrile Pro TV won the International Emmy Award News of 2008 in September 2008.

Andreea Esca is the longest-standing newscaster in Romania. She began her career in 1993, and has been with Pro TV since 1995.

The look of the news operation was changed in March 2020, changing its color from blue to red.

Pro TV news programs are broadcast daily, multiple times per day.

== Newscasters and celebrities ==
- Amalia Enache
- Andra
- Andreea Esca
- Andi Moisescu
- Carmen Tănase
- Cătălin Radu Tănase
- Cristian Leonte
- Corina Caragea
- Cosmin Stan
- Ramona Păun
- Vadim Vîjeu
- Florin Busuioc
- Iulia Pârlea
- Magda Pălimariu
- Daniel Nițoiu
- Mihai Dedu
- Lavinia Petrea
- Andreea Marinescu
- Roxana Hulpe
- Ovidiu Oanță
- Smiley
- Pavel Bartoș
- Tudor Chirilă
- Diana Enache
- Monica Dascălu
- Cabral
- Cosmin Seleși
- Mihaela Radulescu
- Dragoș Bucur
- Mihai Bobonete
- Irina Rimes
- Inna
- Horia Brenciu
- Daniel Pavel
- Theo Rose
- Denis Roabeș
- Adela Popescu
- Bogdan Ciudoiu
- Shurubel
- Lili Sandu
- Chef FOA
- Chef Joseph Hadad
- Chef Radu Dumitrescu

== Former stars ==
- Alina Eremia (Pariu cu viața)
- Carla's Dreams (SuperStar România)
- Cătălin Măruță (La Măruță)
- Constantin Cotimanis (Pariu cu viața, Românii au talent)
- Corina Dănilă
- Cosmin Natanticu (Pe Bune?!)
- Cove (Vorbește lumea)
- Cristian Tabără (Te vezi la Știrile Pro TV, Dăruești și Câștigi)
- Cristina Ciobănașu (Pariu cu viața)
- Dan C. Mihăilescu (Omul care aduce cartea)
- Dem Rădulescu (Musca)
- Dorian Popa (Pariu cu viața)
- Florin Călinescu (Românii au talent)
- Irina Fodor (Poveștiri de Noapte, Vocea României)
- Iulia Albu
- Jean Constantin
- Loredana Groza (Vocea României)
- Marius Moga
- Mihai Codreanu (Știrile Pro TV)
- Mihai Petre (Dansez pentru tine, Românii au talent, Uite cine dansează)
- Mugur Mihăescu (Vacanța Mare)
- Oana Stern-Cuzino (Ce se întâmplă doctore?)
- Oana Zăvoranu
- Octavian Strunilă (Jocuri de celebritate, Fort Boyard)
- Paul Ipate (Jocuri de celebritate, Fort Boyard)
- Raluca Arvat (Știrile din sport)
- Ramona Păuleanu (Vremea)
- Răzvan Fodor (MasterChef Romania)
- Ștefan Bănică (Dansez pentru tine)
- Teo Trandafir (Teo Show)
- Toni Grecu (Serviciul Român de Comedie, Divertis)
- Victor Slav (Vremea)
- Vlad Gherman (Pariu cu viața)

== Sub-channels and subsidiaries ==
- PRO TV Internațional
- Acasă
- PRO Cinema
- PRO Arena
- Acasă Gold
- PRO TV Chișinău

== Awards ==
In September 2008, Știrile Pro TV's social campaign “Any idea what your kid is doing right now?” (Romanian: Tu știi ce mai face copilul tău?) won the International Emmy Awards for “News”, being the first TV station in Eastern Europe to win this award.

At the beginning of 2009, Pro TV won the NAB International Broadcasting Excellence Award for the social campaigns Știrile PRO TV had developed in the previous two years.

== Logos ==
1993-1995

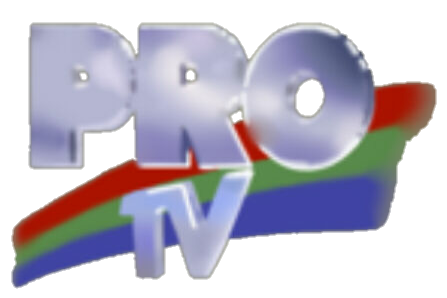
1994 (prelaunch)

1995-2003

2015–15 January 2016

December 2015 – 28 August 2017

28 August 2017–11 march 2027

Upcoming logo or a prototype of an upcoming rebrand On march 11, 2027, on the 33rd anniversary of the first uninterrupted broadcast.

The channel's initial identity was designed by Novocom in the United States, the logo (a PRO wordmark atop an RGB triband with TV in it) was designed by consultancy art director David Henry, who also did the same for its Slovenian counterpart Pop TV.

The bevels and glossy effects were taken away in 2015, and the Pro TV logo is now enclosed in a blue square box. This logo was used until 15 January 2016.

On 15 January 2016, Pro TV's logo became monochrome and the well-known red-green-blue stripes were removed. This logo was first used on December 2015 in the winter 2015-2016 idents.

On 28 August 2017, Pro TV changed its logo and graphics again including with other MediaPro neighboring channels, with the exception that Acasă TV changed its name to Pro 2, Acasă Gold to Pro Gold and Sport.ro to Pro X. On that same day, Știrile PRO TV was rebranded with a new logo and look.

In April 2022, Pro 2 and Pro Gold reverted to Acasă TV and Acasă Gold.

A new logo was revealed during filming of an anniversary program in June 2025, that was revealed in November to be part of an episode from MasterChef Romania. There's still no official confirmation about the launch date of the new logo. Another version of the new logo was revealed during a special moment presented at Untold 2025.

== Sports competitions ==
Pro TV was the main television channel to broadcast the UEFA Champions League in Romania between 2000 and 2009. From 2009 to 2015, it broadcast Cupa României (Romanian Cup), at football, the matches with Romanian teams from UEFA Europa League, and the preliminaries of the UEFA Champions League. From 2015, Pro TV took back the rights for UEFA Champions League and in 2016 it obtained the rights for UEFA Euro 2016. From 2021, Pro TV took back the rights for UEFA Europa League, and also for UEFA Europa Conference League and FA Cup. In 2025, Pro TV, Pro ARENA and VOYO took the rights for Premier League and FA Cup for 3 years (2025-2028).

== Pro TV HD ==
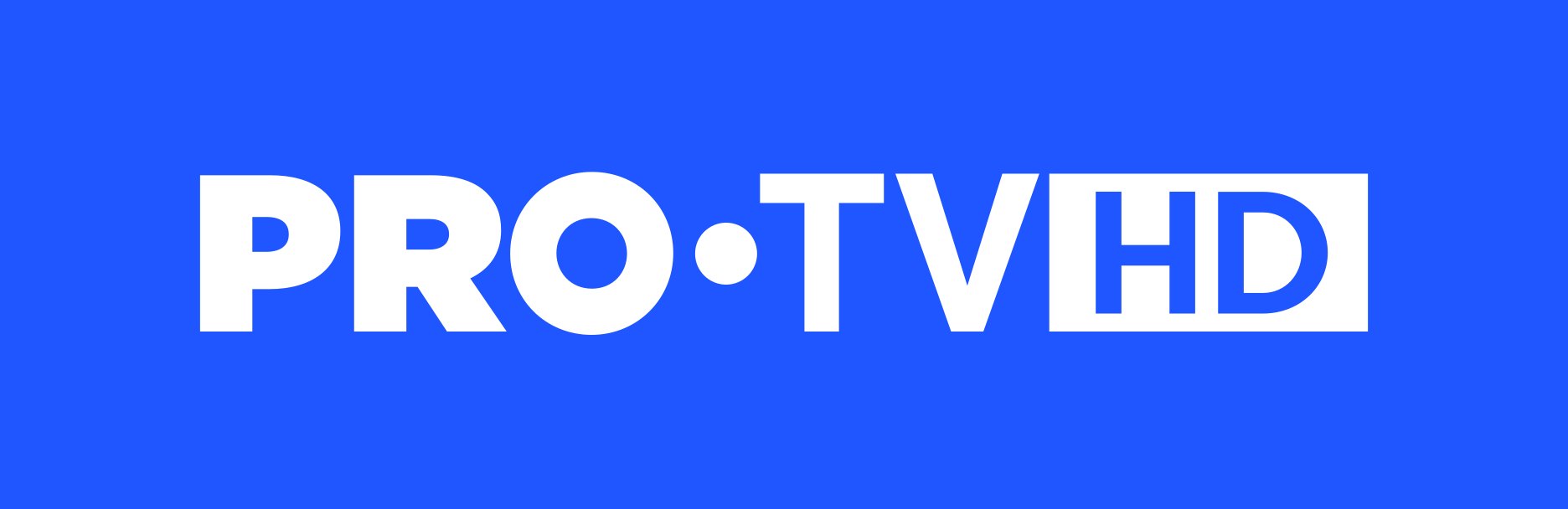
PRO TV HD logo

On 1 December 2006, Pro TV started to broadcast the 7:00 p.m. newscast in high-definition, thus becoming the first terrestrial television network in Romania to air in HD, starting terrestrial transmission until 2015. The station could be received via DVB-T (digital terrestrial transmission) on Channel 30 in Bucharest.

== Slogans ==
Year of first usage	Slogans	Translated
1995-1999	Te uiţi şi câştigi	You watch and win
1999-2001	Românii au Pro TV	Romanians have Pro TV
2001-2012, 2026 (tentative)	Gândeşte liber!	Think freely!
2012-2016	Trăieşte Pro TV	Long live Pro TV
2016-2017	Ai ce trebuie	You've got what it takes
2017-2018	Ştii ce vrei! Vrei Pro TV	You know what you want! You want Pro TV
2018-2021, 2022-2024, 2025	Ăsta-i spectacolul, asta-i televiziunea	This is the show, this is television
2021-2022	Ai ce vrei! Ai Pro TV	You have what you want! You have Pro TV
2024-2025	Ai chef de spectacol! Ai Pro TV	You're in the mood for a show! You have Pro TV
2025-2026	Gândeşte liber! Tu ești viitorul!	Think freely! You are the future!
