= Cabral Ibacka =

Romanian kickboxer (born 1977)

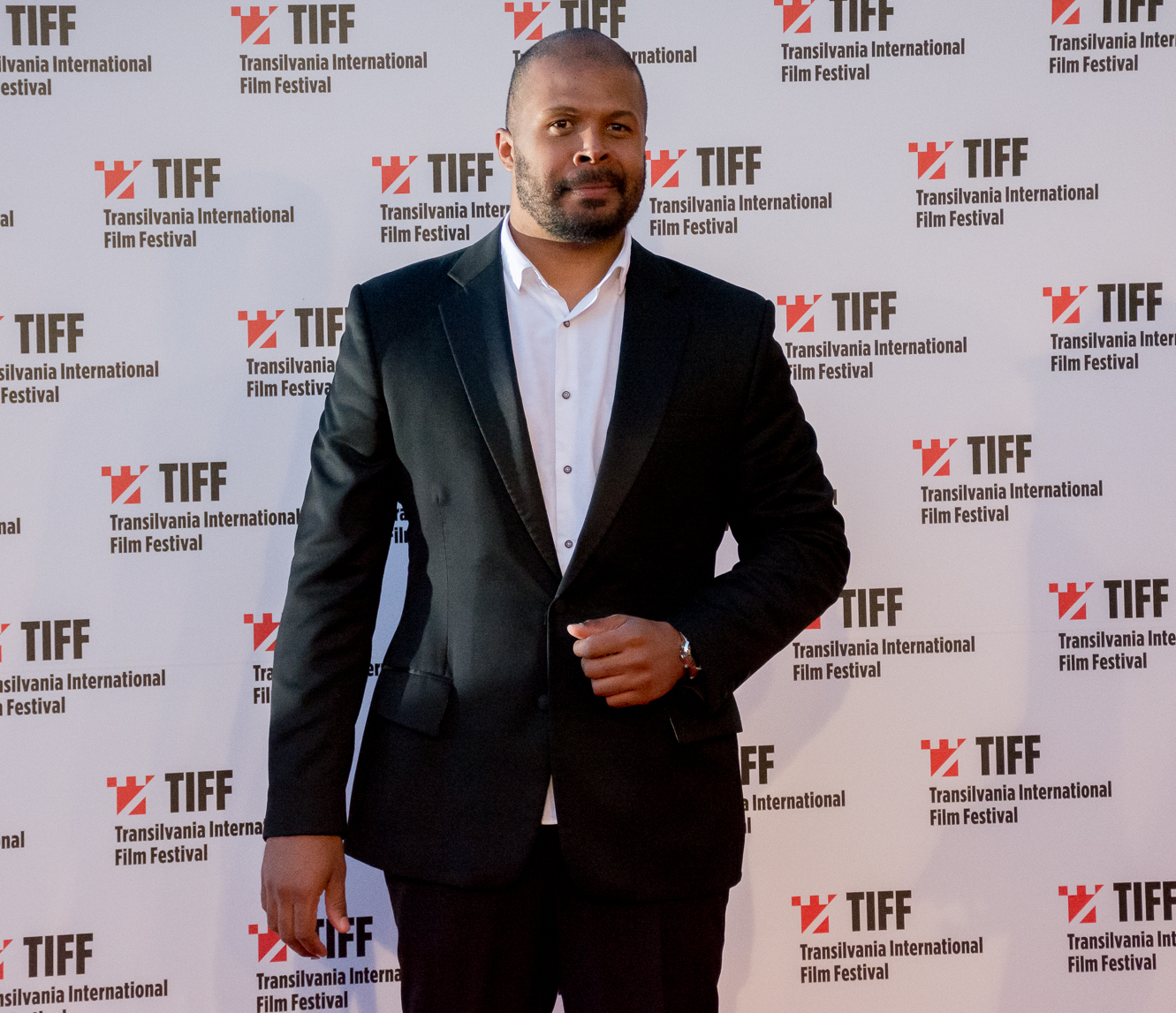
- Born: Cabral Neculai Ibacka; 4 October 1977 (age 48); Bucharest, SR Romania
- Other name: Cabral
- Occupations: Actor, television personality, TV presenter, philanthropist, Tae Bo coach
- Years active: 1998–present
- Height: 2.0 m (6 ft 7 in)
- Spouses: Luana Mitran (m. 2000–2006) Andreea Pătrașcu (m. 2011)
- Children: 3
- Parent(s): Alexander Ibacka; Argentina Boldea
- Website: www.cabral.ro

Cabral Neculai Ibacka Zabana (Romanian pronunciation: [kaˈbral nekuˈlaj iˈbaka]), popularly known as just Cabral (born 4 October 1977) is a Romanian television personality, actor, philanthropist, Tae Bo coach, and 1994 European vice-champion at kick-boxing.

== Career ==
Born in Bucharest, Cabral started training in kickboxing and Muay Thai at age 6. By the age of 23, he had won several titles. A graduate of the Ecological University of Bucharest, Faculty of Sports, Cabral is also known as one of the first promoters of Tae Bo in Romania (after 1997).

Cabral started his television career in 1998 as a host for various shows (Antena 1 and Prima TV after 1999).

In 2000, Cabral moved to Acasă TV, a TV station owned by MediaPro, which opened the door for acting in the movies and series produced by the consortium's production company, MediaPro Pictures. His most notable role came in 2005, when he played Inspector Eduard Bălan in the Romanian hit miniseries Băieți buni. Since then, he starred in several soap-operas. He also made appearances in cinema (in 1996, for the French Je ne marcherais jamais seul!, and in 2007 in Catacombs).

At the same time, Cabral has been active in charity as well. He has worked on several social campaigns with the Ovidiu Rom Association, HHC Romania, Hospice Casa Speranței, and also with his own organization, "Zâmbet și Suflet".

== Personal life ==
Cabral's father is a native of the Republic of the Congo who graduated from the University of Bucharest to become Health Minister in Congo-Brazzaville.

Cabral has been married twice. His first marriage was to Luana Mitran from 2000 until 2006. They have one daughter, Inoke, born in 2002. His current marriage is to actress Andreea Pătrașcu, whom he married in 2011. As of December 5, 2018, Andreea and Cabral have a daughter. On May 20, 2021, they announced they were expecting their second child together, due in fall 2021; the child, a son, was born in October 2021.

Cabral is related to the NBA basketball player Serge Ibaka.

== See also ==
Fire and Ice: The Dragon Chronicles (movie)
