= Adela Popescu =

Romanian actress and singer

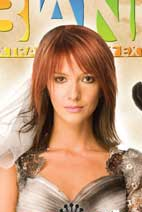
- Born: Adela Elena Popescu; 8 October 1986 (age 40); Șușani, Vâlcea, Romania
- Years active: 2002–present

Adela Elena Popescu (born 8 October 1986 in Șușani, Vâlcea County) is a Romanian actress and singer.

Popescu is notable for being among the original cast in the first Romanian soap opera, Numai Iubirea (Only Love), where she was paired with actor Dan Bordeianu. In 2010 she met her future husband, actor and TV presenter Radu Valcan.

In 2014 Popescu participated in the ALS Ice Bucket Challenge to raise public awareness of amyotrophic lateral sclerosis, a fatal disease of the motor neurons.

== Works ==
=== Television ===
- My Little Pony : The Movie (Romanian version)
- 2014 — "O Nouă Viață" (A New Life), Raluca Dumitrescu
- 2011–2013 — "Pariu Cu Viața" (Bet With Life), Raluca Dumitrescu
- 2010–2011 — '"Iubire & Onoare" (Love and Honor), Carmen Florescu
- 2010 — "Dansez pentru tine" (Dancing with the stars), won 2nd place
- 2009–2010 — "Aniela"(Aniela), Aniela Elefterios
- 2008–2009 — "Îngeraşii" (Little angels), Lia Damian
- 2007–2008 — "Razboiul sexelor" (The battle of the sexes)
- 2006–2007 — "Iubire ca în filme" (Living a movie romance), Ioana Ionescu
- 2005–2006 — "Lacrimi de iubire" (Tears of love), Alexandra Mateescu
- 2004–2005 — "Numai iubirea" (Only Love), Alina Damaschin
- 2002–2003 — "In familie" (All in the family), Anca Ionescu

=== Music ===
- 2010 – "Aniela"
- 2009 – "Weekend"
- 2008 – "O 9 zi in al 9lea cer" (9th Heaven)
- 2008 — "Raspunsul meu" (My answer)
- 2008– "Ingerasii" (Little Angels)
- 2006 — "Iubire ca în filme" (Living a movie romance)
- 2005 — "Lacrimi de iubire" (Tears of love)
