= Valentina Basiul =

Moldovan journalist (1982–2025)

- Born: 1982; Cocieri, Dubăsari District, Moldavian SSR (present-day Moldova)
- Died: 26 November 2025 (aged 43)
- Resting place: Cocieri, Dubăsari District, Moldova
- Education: University of Bucharest
- Occupation: Investigative journalist
- Years active: 2005–2022
- Employer(s): Timpul de dimineață (2005–2010); Adevărul Moldova (2010–2014); Radio Free Europe/Radio Liberty (2014–2022)
- Organization: Centre for Investigative Journalism
- Spouse: Mihail Tașcă

Valentina Basiul (1982 – 26 November 2025) was a Moldovan journalist. She was particularly known for her investigative journalism, including on issues of corruption in the Moldovan government and the Transnistria conflict.

== Background ==
Basiul was born in Cocieri, Dubăsari District in 1982, in what was then the Moldavian Soviet Socialist Republic. Basiul's childhood was impacted by the Transnistrian War, an armed conflict that occurred between 1990 and 1992 between pro-Transnistrian and pro-Moldovan forces. Basiul's childhood home was located close to Transnistrian-controlled territory.

Basiul was married to Mihai Tașcă, a historian, with whom she lived in Chișinău.

== Career ==
Basiul graduated with a degree in journalism from the University of Bucharest in Bucharest, Romania. During her time as a student, she had written a popular article detailing the anti-communist activities of the grandfather and aunt of Vladimir Voronin, the then-President of Moldova who was a member of the Party of Communists of the Republic of Moldova, for the Moldovan newspaper Timpul de dimineață; upon her graduation, she was offered a job for the newspaper as a journalist. Between 2005 and 2010, Basiul reported on various topics, including economics, politics, social issues, corruption, history and culture, as well as Transnistrian affairs. She wrote a series of articles on democratic backsliding during the Voronin government, which lasted until 2009.

In 2010, Basiul was a member of the original journalistic team for Adevărul Moldova, a Moldovan edition of the Romanian newspaper Adevărul. She wrote for the paper's first edition, and was its editor-in-chief at one point. She left the newspaper in 2014 in order to become an editor and reporter for Radio Free Europe/Radio Liberty's Chișinău office, known as Radio Europa Liberă, under Vasile Botnaru. Basiul left the station in 2022.

Basiul wrote guest articles for other Romanian and Moldovan outlets, as well as non-governmental organisations such as the Independent Press Association and the Centre for Investigative Journalism. In 2016, she published a book, Prin ochii presei. Moldova. Un sfert de secol (lit. 'Through the Eyes of the Press: Moldova, a Quarter of a Century'), an analysis of the development of Romanian and Russian-language media in Moldova over 25 years from its independence in 1991.

== Death ==
Basiul died of cancer on 26 November 2025, at the age of 43. She had been diagnosed with the disease 20 years earlier. Her funeral took place in her hometown of Cocieri on 29 November 2025.

Basiul's Radio Free Europe/Radio Liberty colleague Valentina Ursu described her as "a journalist of rare sensitivity and a person of great humanity". Mariana Rață said she was "shocked" at Basiul's death and described as "a journalist who dedicated her body and soul to her job". Radio Free Europe/Radio Liberty said it was "deeply saddened" by her death and expressed its condolences for her husband, family, friends and colleagues. A former spokesperson for the Government of Moldova, Daniel Vodă, described her as a "beautiful soul". Sorina Ștefârță, a former spokesperson for Moldovan president Maia Sandu, also expressed her condolences.
