= Adevărul =

Romanian newspaper

- Type: Daily newspaper
- Format: Compact
- Owner: Adevarul Holding
- Editor-in-chief: Andreea Traicu
- Editor: Adevărul Holding
- Staff writers: 18
- Founded: 1871 (reestablished 1888, 1919, 1946, 1989)
- Headquarters: 21 Fabrica de Glucoză Street, Sector 2
- City: Bucharest
- Country: Romania
- ISSN: 1016-7587
- Website: adevarul.ro

Adevărul (Romanian pronunciation: [adeˈvərul]; meaning "The Truth", formerly spelled Adevĕrul) is a Romanian daily newspaper, based in Bucharest. Founded in Iași, in 1871, and reestablished in 1888, in Bucharest, it was the main left-wing press venue to be published during the Romanian Kingdom's existence, adopting an independent pro-democratic position, advocating land reform, and demanding universal suffrage. Under its successive editors Alexandru Beldiman and Constantin Mille, it became noted for its virulent criticism of King Carol I. This stance developed into a republican and socialist agenda, which made Adevărul clash with the Kingdom's authorities on several occasions. As innovative publications which set up several local and international records during the early 20th century, Adevărul and its sister daily Dimineața competed for the top position with the right-wing Universul before and throughout the interwar period. In 1920, Adevărul also began publishing its prestigious cultural supplement, Adevărul Literar și Artistic. By the 1930s, their anti-fascism and the Jewish ethnicity of their new owners made Adevărul and Dimineața the targets of negative campaigns in the far right press, and the antisemitic Octavian Goga cabinet banned both upon obtaining power in 1937. Adevărul was revived by Barbu Brănișteanu after World War II, but was targeted by Communist Romania's censorship apparatus and again closed down in 1951.

A newspaper of the same name was set up in 1989, just days after the Romanian Revolution, replacing Scînteia, organ of the defunct Romanian Communist Party. Initially a supporter of the dominant National Salvation Front, it adopted a controversial position, being much criticized for producing populist and radical nationalist messages and for supporting the violent Mineriad of 1990. Under editors Dumitru Tinu and Cristian Tudor Popescu, when it reasserted its independence as a socially conservative venue and was fully privatized, Adevărul became one of the most popular and trusted press venues. Nevertheless, it remained involved in scandals over alleged or confirmed political and commercial dealings, culminating in a 2005 conflict which saw the departure of Popescu, Bogdan Chireac and other panelists and the creation of rival newspaper Gândul. As of 2006, Adevărul had been the property of Dinu Patriciu, a prominent Romanian businessman and politician.

== Ownership, editorial team, publications, and structure ==
Adevărul is the main trademark of Adevărul Holding, a company owned by Cristian Burci. The main newspaper itself is edited by editor-in-chief Dan Marinescu and several deputy editors (Liviu Avram, Adina Stan, Andrei Velea and others).

Also part of the holding are a number of other publications:

- Dilema Veche, a cultural magazine
- Historia popular history magazine
- Click!, a tabloid
- Click! pentru femei ('Click! for Women') magazine
- Click! Sănătate ('Click! Health') magazine
- Click! Poftă bună! ('Click! Bon Appetit!') magazine
- OK! magazine.

In December 2010, Adevărul Holding also launched a sister version of its title asset, published in neighboring Moldova as Adevărul Moldova.

The Romanian newspaper had special pages of regional content, one each for Bucharest, Transylvania, Moldavia, the western areas of Banat and Crișana, and the southern areas of Wallachia and Northern Dobruja. It also hosts columns about the larger sections of Romanian diaspora in Europe, those in Spain and Italy. Adevărul publishes several supplements. In addition to Adevărul Literar și Artistic (formerly a separate magazine, now issued as a culture supplement which is issued on Wednesdays), it publishes five others: on Mondays, the sports magazine Antifotbal ("Anti-football"), which focuses on the traditionally less-covered areas of the Romanian sports scene; on Tuesdays, Adevărul Expert Imobiliar ("Real Estate Expert"); on Thursdays, Adevărul Sănătate ("Health"), a health and lifestyle magazine; on Fridays, a TV guide, Adevărul Ghid TV, followed on Sundays by the entertainment section Magazin de Duminică ("Sunday Magazine"). In October 2008, Adevărul also launched Adevărul de Seară ("Evening Adevărul"), a free daily newspaper and evening edition, which was closed down in May 2011.

As of 2008, the newspaper publishes Colecția Adevărul, a collection of classic and popular works in world and Romanian literature. These are issued as additional supplements, and sold as such with the newspaper's Thursday editions.

== History ==
=== 1871 and 1888 editions ===
==== Origins ====
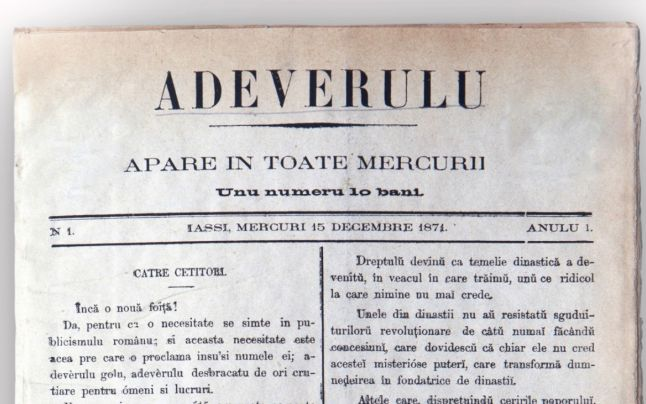
The Adeverulu published in Iași (front page of the first issue in the 1871 series).

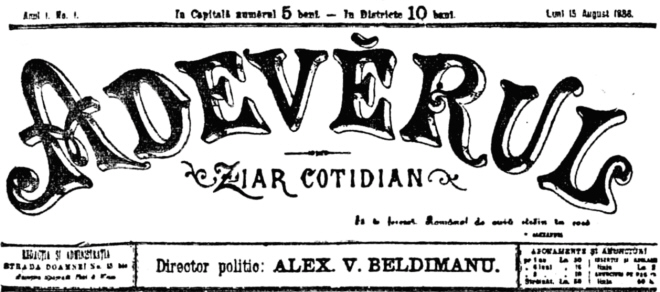
First version of the Adevĕrul logo (front page of the first issue in the 1888 series). A similar version was used in the early 1990s (Adevărul, in light blue, with identical typeface).

A newspaper by the name Adevĕrulŭ (pronounced the same as Adevărul, but following versions of the Romanian alphabet which emphasized etymology, in this case from the Latin word veritas) was founded on December 15, 1871. The weekly was owned by Alexandru Beldiman, a former Police commander, and published in Iași, the former capital of Moldavia. Beldiman directed the newspaper in opposition to Romania's new Domnitor, the German prince Carol of Hohenzollern, calling for the restoration of his deposed and exiled predecessor, the Moldavian-born Alexandru Ioan Cuza. Its articles against the new monarch soon after resulted in Beldiman's indictment for defamation and attack on the 1866 Constitution. He was eventually acquitted, but the journal ceased publication with its 13th issue (April 1872).

Adevărul reemerged as a daily on August 15, 1888, seven years after the proclamation of a Romanian Kingdom. It was then known as Adevĕrul, which also reflected the veritas origin, and the ĕ, although obsolete by the early 20th century, was kept as a distinctive sign by all the paper's owners until 1951. Initially financed by a printer, who agreed to advance it a short-term credit, the new gazette was co-founded by Alexandru Beldiman and Alexandru Al. Ioan, the son of former Domnitor Cuza, and was again noted for its radical and often irreverent critique of newly crowned King Carol and the "foreign dynasty". The small editorial team included writer Grigore Ventura and his son Constantin, as well as, after a while, political columnist I. Hussar. In December 1888, it changed its format, from a No. 6 to a No. 10 in paper size, while abandoning the initial, calligraphed logo, in favor of a standard serif which it used until 1951.

Beldiman's hostility to the monarchy was reflected in one of the 15 objectives set by the second series' first issue, whereby Adevărul called for an elective monarchy with magistratures reserved for locals, and evident in having chosen for the paper's motto a quote from poet Vasile Alecsandri, which read: Să te feresci, Române!, de cuiŭ strein în casă ("Romanians, beware of foreign nails in your house", an allusion to Carol's German origin). The journalists called Carol's accession to the throne by the 1866 plebiscite "an undignified comedy", refused to capitalize references to M. S. Regele ("H[is] M[ajesty] the King"), and referred to May 10, the national celebration of the Kingdom, as a "national day of mourning". In December 1888, they also published a list of Carol's alleged attacks on Romanian dignity. According to one account, after the newspaper's first May 10 issue came out in 1889, Police forces bought copies which they later set on fire. Reportedly, its circulation peaked on May 10 of each year, from some 5,000 to some 25,000 or 30,000 copies. Adevărul also debated with the German newspapers Norddeutsche Allgemeine Zeitung and Kölnische Zeitung, who worried that Romania's anti-dynasticists plotted Carol's murder, assuring them that the actual battle was political, "in broad daylight, on the wide path of public opinion." In 1891, the paper called for boycotting Carol's 25th anniversary on the throne.

==== Early campaigns ====
Located in Bucharest, the new Adevărul had its original headquarters in Calea Victoriei (Doamnei Street, Nouă Street, Brătianu Boulevard, and Enei Street). It later moved to a building near the National Bank and the Vilacrosse Passage, where it occupied just several rooms (leading its staff to repeatedly complain about the lack of space). A serious crisis occurred during 1892, when, having omitted to register his trademark, Beldiman was confronted with the appearance of a competing Adevărul, published by his former associate Toma Basilescu, who had been the original gazette's administrator for the previous year. In June 1892, an arbitral tribunal decided in favor of Beldiman, ordering Basilescu to close down his paper.

With time, the newspaper had moved from advocating King Carol's replacement with a local ruler to supporting republicanism. In 1893, as part of its extended campaign, during which it gathered letters of protest from its readers, Adevărul obtained the cancellation of plans for a public subscription to celebrate the engagement of Crown Prince Ferdinand to Marie of Edinburgh. In addition, Adevărul began militating for a number of major social and political causes, which it perceived as essential to democracy. In its 15 points of 1888, it notably demanded universal suffrage to replace the census method enshrined in the 1866 Constitution, unicameralism through a disestablishment of the Senate, a land reform to replace leasehold estates, self-governance at a local level, progressive taxation, Sunday rest for employees, universal conscription instead of a permanent under arms force, women's rights, emancipation for Romanian Jews. It embraced the cause of Romanians living outside the Old Kingdom, particularly those in Austro-Hungarian-ruled Transylvania, while calling for Romania to separate itself from its commitment to the Triple Alliance, and advocating a Balkan Federation to include Romania.

Adevărul also took an active interest in the problems facing Romania's rural population: while calling for a land reform, it expressed condemnation of the failing sanitary system, which it blamed for the frequency of countryside epidemics, and for the administrative system, which it accused of corruption. It depicted revolt as legitimate, and campaigned in favor of amnesty for prisoners taken after the 1888 peasant riots. The paper supported educational reforms in the countryside, calling attention to the specific issues faced by rural teachers, but also campaigned against their use of corporal punishment as a method of maintaining school discipline. In similar vein, Adevărul focused on cases of abuse within the Romanian Army, documenting cases where soldiers were being illegally used as indentured servants, noting the unsanitary conditions which accounted for an unusually high rate of severe conjunctivitis, and condemning officers for regularly beating their subordinates. As part of the latter campaign, it focused on Crown Prince Ferdinand, who was tasked with instructing a battalion and is said to have slapped a soldier for not performing the proper moves. Adevărul investigated numerous other excesses of authority, and on several occasions formed special investigative commissions of reporters who followed suspicions of judicial error. It also spoke out in favor of Jewish emancipation, while theorizing a difference between the minority "exploiting Jews" and an assimilable Jewish majority.

Under Beldiman, the newspaper took pride in stating its independence, by taking distance from the two dominant parties, the Conservatives and the National Liberal Party, who either supported or tolerated King Carol. This stance reputedly earned the publication an unusual status: anecdotes have it that Conservative leader Lascăr Catargiu would only read Adevărul while in the opposition, and that its columnist Albert Honigman was the first and for long time only journalist allowed into the upper class society at Casa Capșa restaurant. In February 1889, the Conservative Premier Theodor Rosetti reputedly tried to silence Adevărul by having its distributors arrested. In 1892, Adevărul became the first local newspaper to feature a cartoonist section, which hosted caricatures of the period's potentates, and its rebelliousness allegedly frightened the Romanian zincographers to the point where the plates had to be created abroad. In April 1893, the Catargiu cabinet organized a clampdown on the newspaper: it arrested its editor Eduard Dioghenide (who was sentenced to a year in prison on charges of sedition) and, profiting from the non-emancipated status of Romanian Jews, it expelled its Jewish contributors I. Hussar and Carol Schulder. Another incident occurred during May of the following year, when the paper's headquarters were attacked by rioting University of Bucharest students, who were reportedly outraged by an article critical of their behavior, but also believed to have been instigated by the Conservative executive's Gendarmerie.

In parallel, Adevărul took steps to establishing its reputation as a newspaper of record. A local first was established in June 1894, when Adevărul hosted the first foreign correspondence article received by a Romanian periodical: a telegram sent by the French socialist newspaperman Victor Jaclard, discussing the assassination of Sadi Carnot and the accession of Jean Casimir-Perier to the office of President. Adevărul also broke ground by publishing a plate portrait of Casimir-Perier only a day after his rise to prominence. Early on, the newspaper also had a cultural agenda, striving to promote Romanian literature for the general public and following a method outlined by a 1913 article: "In his free time [...], the reader, having satisfied his curiosity about the daily events, finds entertainment for the soul in the newspaper's literary column. People who would not spend a dime on literary works, will nevertheless read literature once this is made available to them, in a newspaper they bought for the information it provides." Initially, Adevărul dedicated its Sunday issue to literary contributions, receiving such pieces from George Coșbuc, Haralamb Lecca, Ioan N. Roman, and the adolescent poet Ștefan Octavian Iosif.

==== Mille's arrival and rise in popularity ====
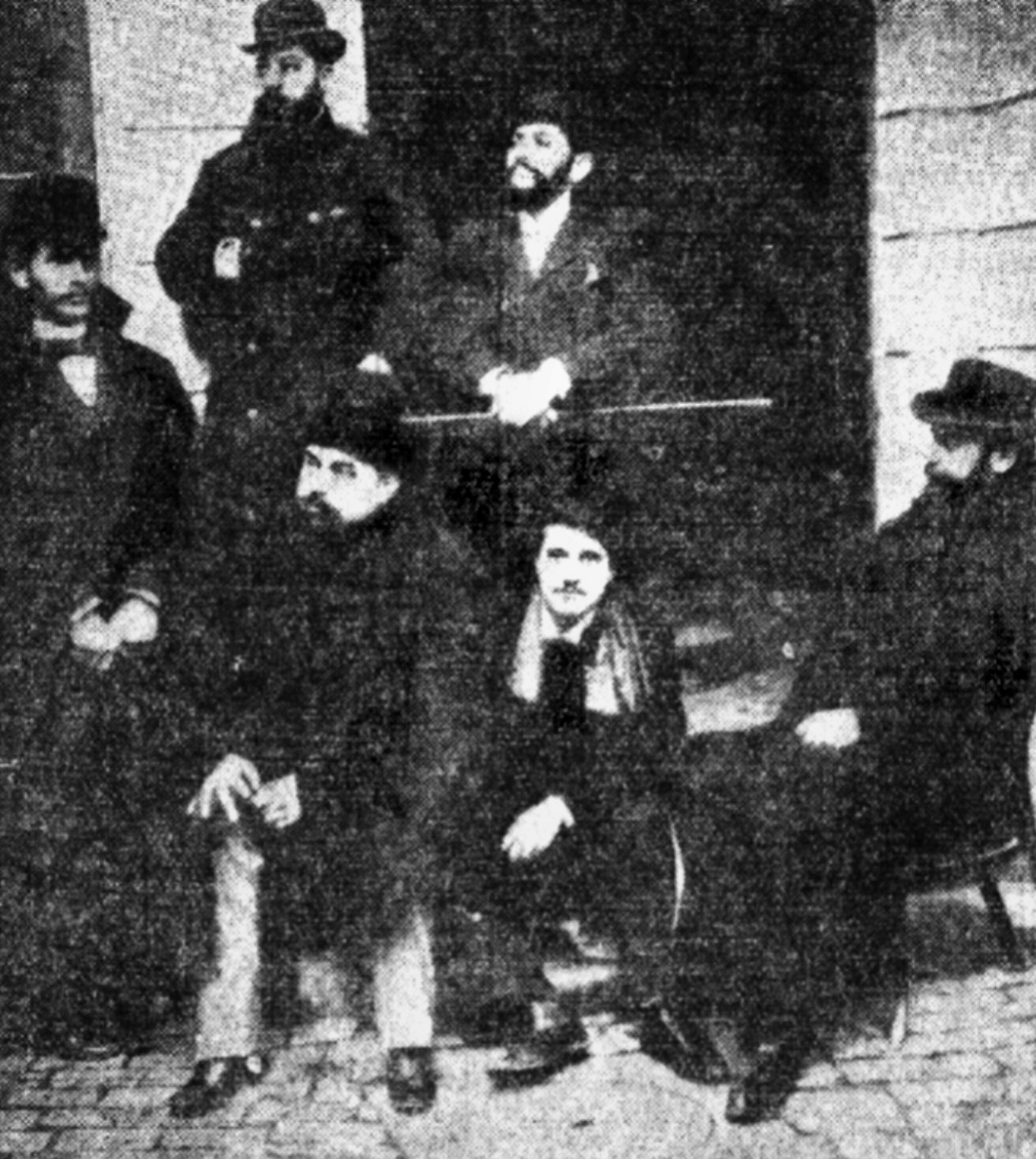
Adevărul editors in 1897. Constantin Mille is first seated from left. Standing behind him are Ioan Bacalbașa (middle) and Constantin Bacalbașa (right)

By 1893, the gazette's panel came to include several leading activists of the newly created Romanian Social Democratic Workers' Party (PSDMR), among them Constantin Mille and brothers Anton and Ioan Bacalbașa. Mille was an innovator, seen by his contemporaries as a "father of modern Romanian journalism" (a title carved on his tombstone in Bellu cemetery). Although brief, Anton Bacalbașa's stay also left a distinct mark on Adevărul: in 1893, he authored what is supposedly the first interview in Romanian media history. Working together, Mille, Beldiman, and Bacalbașa sought to coalesce the left-wing forces into a single league for universal suffrage, but Adevărul soon pulled out of the effort, accusing fellow militant Constantin Dobrescu-Argeș of having embezzled the funds put at his disposal.

In 1895, Mille purchased the newspaper, but, even though the Alecsandri motto was removed a short while after, Beldiman maintained editorial control until his death three years later, explaining that he was doing so in order to maintain an independent line. The purchase was received with consternation by many PSDMR members, particularly since Adevărul competed with its official platforms (Munca and, after 1894, Lumea Nouă). In late 1893, Adevărul was also publishing articles by an unsigned author, who may have been Constantin Stere (later known as the man behind post-socialist "Poporanism") ridiculing Munca's elitist content.

Eventually, the PSDMR expelled Mille on grounds of having betrayed socialism. Allegedly upset that Beldiman had chosen Mille's offer over his own, Anton Bacalbașa quit Adevărul, becoming one of Mille's most vocal critics. A third Bacalbașa, Constantin, stayed on, and, from 1895, was Mille's first editor. He became known for his anti-colonial stance, giving positive coverage to the 1896 Philippine Revolution.

In 1904, the board created Adevĕrul S. A., the first in a series of joint stock companies meant to insure its control of commercial rights. In 1898, after Mille invested its profits into real estate, Adevărul left its crowded surroundings and moved to a specially designed new building on Sărindar Street (the present-day C. Mille Street, between Calea Victoriei and the Cișmigiu Gardens). Inspired by Le Figaro's palatial quarters, it was first building of such proportions in the history of Romania's print media, housing a printing press, paper storage, distribution office and mail room, as well as a library, several archives, a phone station and a Romanian Orthodox chapel. Its halls were luxuriously decorated according to Mille's specifications, and adorned with posters by international artists such as Henri de Toulouse-Lautrec and Alfons Mucha, and by its own occasional illustrator, Nicolae Vermont. Around 1900, Mille purchased a neighboring plot, the former Saint-Frères manufacturing plant, and unified both buildings under a single facade. It was there that, after placing an order with the Mergenthaler Company, he installed the first Linotype machines to be used locally.

Adevărul established itself as the most circulated paper, setting up successive records in terms of copies per issue due to Mille's favorable approach to modern printing techniques: from 10,000 in 1894, these brought the circulation to 12,000 in 1895 and 30,000 in 1907. Writing in 1898, Mille took pride in calling his newspaper "a daily encyclopedia" or "cinema" for the regular public, universally available at only 5 bani per copy. In 1904, making efforts to keep up with his rival Luigi Cazzavillan, founder of the right-wing competitor Universul, Mille established a morning edition, which was emancipated under separate management in December of the same year, under the new name Dimineața. As of 1912, Dimineața was the first Romanian daily to use full color print, with a claim to have been the world's first color newspaper. Beginning 1905, both gazettes ensured stable revenues by leasing their classified advertising sections to Carol Schulder's Schulder Agency.

==== Early cultural ventures ====
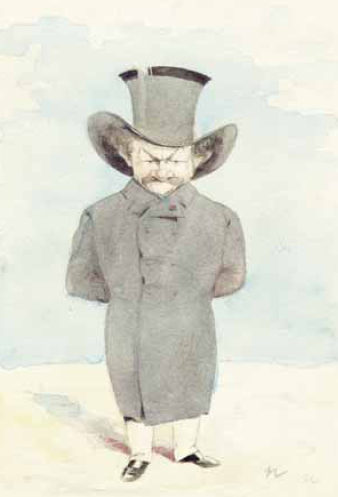
Nicolae Petrescu Găină's caricature of C. I. Stăncescu, original watercolor

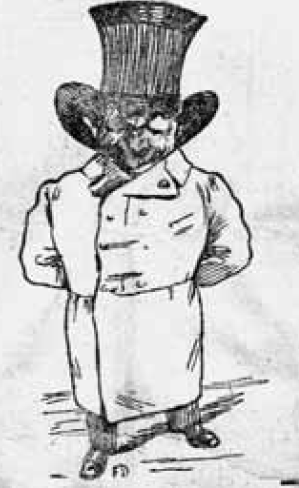
The same image, as republished by Adevărul

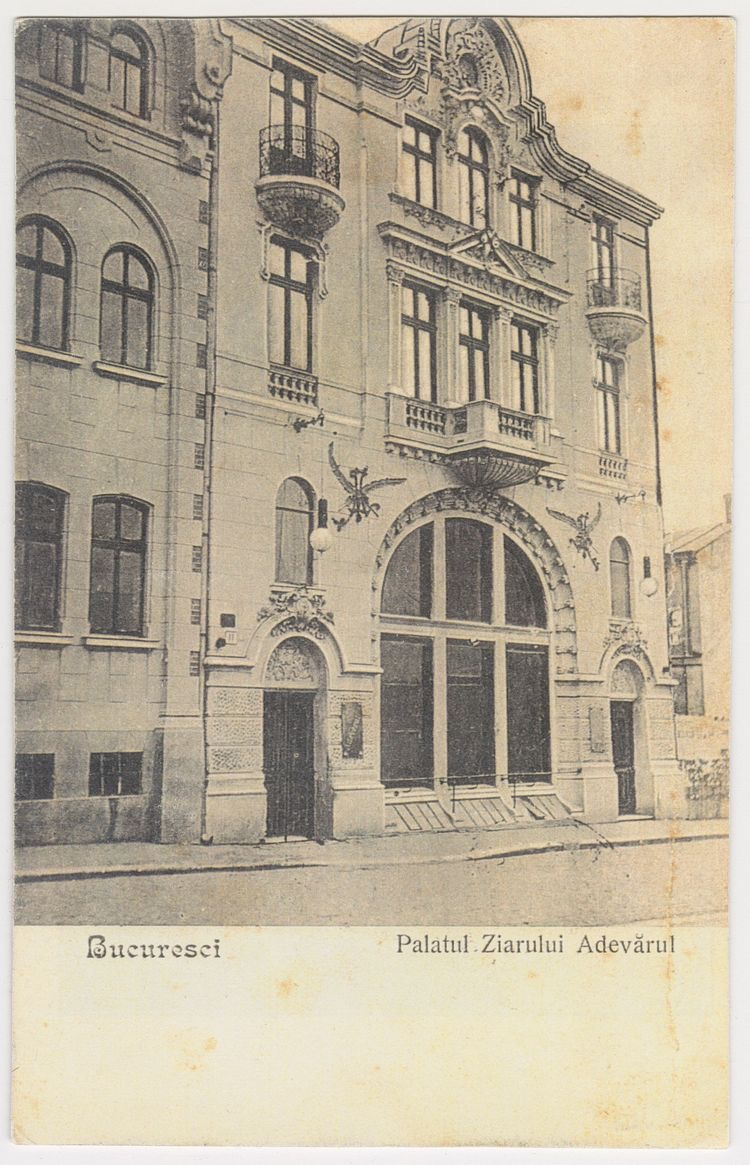
Adevărul headquarters (1898) on Constantin Mille (then Sărindar) Street in Bucharest, designed by architect Ștefan Ciocârlan, with a Beaux-Arts facade showing slight Art Nouveau influences

In order to consecrate the newspaper's cultural ambitions, Mille became head of a literary club, while he considered creating a separate literary edition. A literary supplement (Adevĕrul Literar, "The Literary Truth") was in print between 1894 and 1896, before being replaced by Adevĕrul Ilustrat ("The Illustrated Truth") and soon after by Adevĕrul de Joi ("The Truth on Thursday"), edited by poet Artur Stavri, and eventually closed down due to lack of funding in 1897. Although short-lived, these publications had a significant part on the cultural scene, and hosted contributions by influential, mostly left-wing, cultural figures: Stavri, Stere, Constantin D. Anghel, Traian Demetrescu, Arthur Gorovei, Ion Gorun, Henric and Simion Sanielevici. In this context, Adevărul also began receiving contributions from prominent humorist Ion Luca Caragiale—previously a conservative adversary, known for his mockery of republican sensationalism. In return for the 1897 setback, the gazette began allocating space to serialized works of literature, including sketches by Caragiale (most of the writings later published as Momente și schițe), as well as The Count of Monte Cristo by Alexandre Dumas, père.

In later years, Adevărul experimented by publishing a different supplement each day, including one titled Litere și Arte ("Arts and Letters"). By the mid-1890s, Adevărul was encouraging developments in visual arts in Romania, publishing several original posters, and hosting art chronicles signed with various pseudonyms. In 1895, it covered the artistic environment's split into several competing wings: its columnist, using the pseudonym Index, gave a negative review to Nicolae Grigorescu and the other Impressionists or Realists who together had rebelled against the official academic salon of C. I. Stăncescu. The following year however, a chronicler who used the pen name Gal praised the anti-academic independents' salon, supporting its members ștefan Luchian, Alexandru Bogdan-Pitești and Vermont (whose portraits it featured as illustrations for the texts, alongside a notorious caricature of C. I. Stăncescu by Nicolae Petrescu-Găină).

By 1905, Adevărul was publishing a supplement titled Viața Literară ("The Literary Life", edited by Coșbuc, Gorun and Ilarie Chendi) and two other satirical periodicals, Belgia Orientului ("The Orient's Belgium", named after a common sarcastic reference to the Romanian Kingdom) and Nea Ghiță ("Uncle Ghiță"). It also began running its own publishing house, Editura Adevĕrul, noted early on for its editions of Constantin Mille's novels, Caragiale's sketches, and George Panu's memoirs of his time with the literary club Junimea. In parallel, Mille reached out into other areas of local culture. Early on, he instituted a tradition of monthly festivities, paid for from his own pocket, and noted for the participation of leading figures in Romanian theater (Maria Giurgea, Constantin Nottara and Aristizza Romanescu among them). Beginning 1905, the paper had for its illustrator Iosif Iser, one of the major graphic artists of his generation, whose satirical drawings most often targeted Carol I and Russian Emperor Nicholas II (attacked for violently suppressing the 1905 Revolution). As a promotional tactic, Adevărul participated in the National Fair of 1906, where it exemplified its printing techniques while putting out a collector's version of the newspaper, titled Adevĕrul la Expoziție ("Adevĕrul at the Exhibit").

==== New advocacies and 1907 Revolt coverage ====
Several mass social, cultural and political campaigns were initiated or endorsed by Adevărul before 1910. According to one of Constantin Mille's columns of 1906, the newspaper continued to see itself as an advocate of people's causes: "Any of our readers know that, should any injustice be committed against them, should all authorities discard them, they will still find shelter under this newspaper's roof." In line with Beldiman and Mille's political vision, it militated for a statue of Domnitor Cuza to be erected in Iași (such a monument being eventually inaugurated in 1912). Similar initiatives included the 1904 event marking 400 years since the death of Moldavian Prince Stephen the Great, and the erection in Craiova of a bust honoring its deceased contributor, poet Traian Demetrescu. At around the same time, Mille's gazette became a noted supporter of feminism, and created a special column, Cronica femeii ("The Woman's Chronicle"), assigned to female journalist Ecaterina Raicoviceanu-Fulmen. Over the following decade, it hosted regular contributions by other militant women, among them Lucrezzia Karnabatt, E. Marghita, Maura Prigor, Laura Vampa and Aida Vrioni. Having endorsed the creation of a journalists' trade union and a Romanian Writers' Society, the newspaper also claimed to have inspired the idea of a Bucharest ambulance service, a project taken up by physician Nicolae Minovici and fulfilled in 1906. Despite his leftist sympathies, Mille found himself in conflict with Romania's labor movement: believing that the Linotype machines would render their jobs obsolete, they went on strike, before the editor himself resolved to educate them all in the new techniques.

Adevărul's ongoing support for Jewish emancipation was accompanied by a sympathetic take on the growing Zionist movement. In 1902, the paper offered an enthusiastic reception to visiting French Zionist Bernard Lazare, prompting negative comments from the antisemitic French observers. By 1906, Adevărul's attitude prompted historian Nicolae Iorga, leader of the antisemitic Democratic Nationalist Party, to accuse the newspaper of cultivating a "Jewish national sentiment" which, he claimed, had for its actual goal the destruction of Romania. In his Naționalism sau democrație ("Nationalism or Democracy") series of articles for Sămănătorul magazine (an ethno-nationalist organ published by Iorga), the Transylvanian-based thinker Aurel Popovici, who criticized the elites of Austria-Hungary on grounds that they were serving Jewish interests, alleged that the impact of Adevărul and Dimineața carried the same risk for Romania. In later years, Iorga casually referred to Adevărul as "the Jewish press organ", while, together with his political associate A. C. Cuza and other contributors to his Neamul Românesc journal, he repeatedly claimed that the entire press was controlled by the Jews. The antisemitic discourse targeting the Sărindar-based publications was taken up in the same period by the traditionalist Transylvanian poet Octavian Goga and by businessman-journalist Stelian Popescu (who, in 1915, became owner of Universul).

Pursuing its interest in the peasant question, Adevărul was one of the main factors of dissent during the 1907 Peasant Revolt, which was violently quelled by the National Liberal cabinet of Dimitrie Sturdza. The paper reported on or made allegations about the shooting and maltreatment of peasants, reputedly to the point where government officials promised to end repression if Mille agreed to tone down his publication. Various researchers accuse Mille of having seriously exaggerated the scale of repression for political purposes. Historian Anton Caragea, who theorizes the intrusion of Austria-Hungary, argues that, having received payments from Austro-Hungarian spies, both Adevărul and Universul were conditioned to incite public sentiment against the Sturdza executive. Soon after the revolt, Editura Adevĕrul published Caragiale's 1907, din primăvară până în toamnă ("1907, From Spring to Autumn"), an attack on the Kingdom's institutions and analysis of its failures in connection to the rebellion, which was an instant best-seller.

==== Early 1910s ====
Following the 1907 events, the gazette participated in an extended anti-monarchy campaign, which also involved Facla, a newspaper edited by Mille's son-in-law, the republican and socialist journalist N. D. Cocea, as well as Romanian anarchist milieus. In 1912, it participated in one of Cocea's publicity stunts, during which the Facla editor, together with his colleague, poet Tudor Arghezi, simulated their own trial for lèse majesté, by reporting the mock procedures and hosting advertisements for Facla. Like Facla itself, Adevărul circulated stereotypical satires of Carol I, constantly referring to him as neamțul ("the German" in colloquial terms) or căpușa ("the tick").

In 1912, the combined circulation of Adevărul and Dimineața exceeded 100,000 copies, bringing it a revenue of 1 million lei; the two periodicals assessed that, between January and August 1914, they had printed some 1,284 tons of paper. Adevărul had become the highest-grossing, but also the highest-paying press venue, and consequently the most sought-after employer: in 1913, it had a writing and technical staff of 250 people (whose salaries amounted to some 540,000 lei), in addition to whom it employed 60 correspondents and 1,800 official distributors. Adevărul reportedly had a notoriously stiff editorial policy, outlined by Mille and applied by his administrative editor Sache Petreanu, whereby it taxed the proofreaders for each typo. Mille himself repeatedly urged his employees to keep up with the events, decking the walls with portraits of 19th-century newspaperman Zaharia Carcalechi, infamous for his professional lassitude. In addition to establishing permanent telephone links within Austria-Hungary (in both Vienna and Budapest), Adevărul maintained a regular correspondence with various Balkan capitals, and pioneered shorthand in transcribing interviews. Among its indigenous journalists to be sent on special assignment abroad were Emil Fagure and Barbu Brănișteanu, who reported on the 1908 Young Turk Revolution from inside the Ottoman Empire, as well as from the Principality of Bulgaria and the Kingdom of Serbia. The newspaper was nevertheless subject to a practical joke played by its correspondent, future writer Victor Eftimiu: instead of continuing his Adevărul-sponsored trip to France, Eftimiu stopped in Vienna, and compiled his "Letters from Paris" column from the press articles he read at Café Arkaden.

Adevărul's coverage of the international scene gave Romanians a window to political and cultural turmoil. By 1908, Adevărul was covering the burgeoning European avant-garde, offering mixed reviews to Futurism and deploring the supposed end of literary realism. In late 1910, claiming to speak for "the democratic world", it celebrated the Portuguese republican revolt. The efforts made for establishing and preserving international connections, Adevărul claimed, made it one of the first papers in the world to report some other events of continental importance: the 1911 food riots in Vienna, the outbreak of the First Balkan War, and the diplomatic conflict between the Greek and Bulgarian Kingdoms in the run-up to the Second Balkan War. During the latter showdowns, Adevărul also employed several literary and political personalities as its correspondents: the paper's future manager Iacob Rosenthal in Sofia, Serbian journalist Pera Taletov in Belgrade, Romanian writer Argentina Monteoru in Istanbul, and Prince Albert Gjika in Cetinje. In July 1913, the newspaper reported extensively on massacres committed by the Hellenic Army in Dojran, Kilkis and other settlements of Macedonia, while discussing the "terror regime" instituted in Bulgaria by Tsar Ferdinand I. Later the same month, as Romania joined the anti-Bulgarian coalition and her troops entered Southern Dobruja, Adevărul gave coverage to the spread of cholera among soldiers, accusing the Conservative executive headed by Titu Maiorescu of hiding its actual toll.

Also at that stage, the newspaper had become known for organizing raffles, which provided winners with expensive prizes, such as real estate and furniture. It was also the first periodical to have established itself in the countryside, a record secured through a special contract with the Romanian Post, whereby postmen acted as press distributors, allowing some 300 press storage rooms to be established nationally. Political differences of the period, pitting Adevărul editors against National Liberal politicos, threatened this monopoly: under National Liberal cabinets, the Post was prevented from distributing the newspaper, leading it to rely on subscriptions and private distributors. Famous among the latter were Bucharest paperboys, who advertised Adevărul with political songs such as the republican anthem La Marseillaise.

==== World War I ====
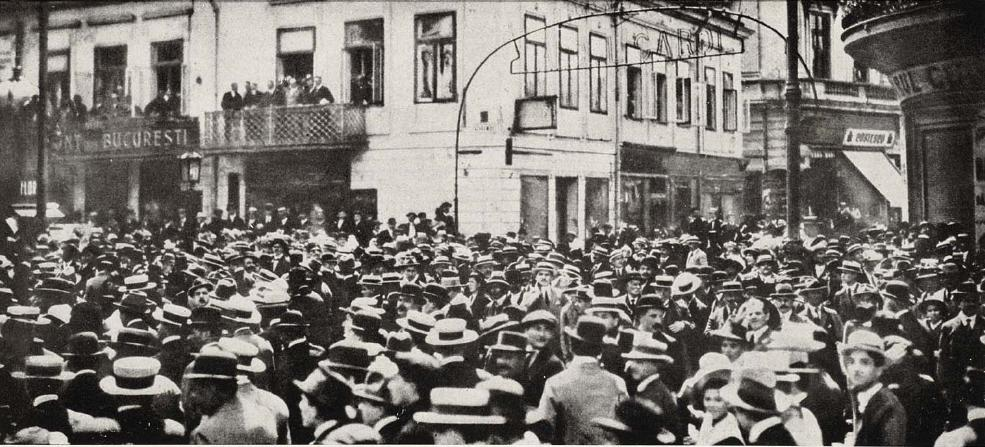
Bucharest demonstration in favor of Romania's entry into World War I (1915 or 1916).

After the outbreak of World War I, the newspaper further divided the surviving socialist camp by swinging into the interventionist group, calling for a declaration of war against the Central Powers. This position was more compatible with that of newspapers like Universul, Flacăra, Furnica or Epoca, clashing with the socialist press, the Poporanists, and Germanophile gazettes such as Seara, Steagul, Minerva or Opinia. According to historian Lucian Boia, this stance was partly explained by the Jewish origin of its panelists, who, as advocates of assimilation, wanted to identify with the Romanian cultural nationalism and irredenta; an exception was the Germanophile Brănișteanu, for a while marginalized within the group.

Adevărul agitated with energy against Austria-Hungary on the Transylvanian issue, while giving less exposure to the problems of Romanians in Russian-held Bessarabia. This was a programmatic choice, outlined by Transylvanian academic Ioan Ursu in a September 1914 article for Adevărul, where Russophobia was condemned as a canard. Over the course of 1914, the aging historian A. D. Xenopol also made Adevărul the host of his interventionist essays, later collected as a volume. In early winter 1915, Adevărul publicized the visit of British scholar Robert William Seton-Watson, who campaigned in favor of the Entente Powers and supported the interventionist Cultural League for the Unity of All Romanians. In his interview with Adevărul, Seton-Watson identified the goals of Romanians with those of Serbs and Croats, stressing that their common interest called for the partition of Austria-Hungary, ending what he called "the brutal and artificial domination of the Magyar race". One of the newspaper's own articles, published in April 1916, focused on the ethnic German Transylvanian Saxons and their relationship with Romanians in Austria-Hungary, claiming: "Except for the Hungarians, we had throughout our history, just as we have today, an enemy just as irreducible and who would desire our disappearance just as much: the Saxon people." According to literary historian Dumitru Hîncu, such discourse was replicated by other pro-Entente venues, marking a temporary break with a local tradition of more positive ethnic stereotypes regarding the Germans.

The interventionist campaign peaked in summer 1916, when it became apparent that Ion I. C. Brătianu's National Liberal cabinet was pondering Romania's entry into the conflict on the Entente side (see Romania during World War I). Mille himself explained the war as a "corrective" answer to Romania's social problems and a "diversion" for the rebellion-minded peasants. The newspaper, described by American scholar Glenn E. Torrey as "sensationalist", provided enthusiastic accounts of the Russians' Brusilov Offensive, which had stabilized the Eastern Front in Romania's proximity, announcing that the "supreme moment" for Romania's intervention had arrived. This attitude resulted in a clash between Adevărul on one side and Romania's new dominant socialist faction, the Social Democratic Party of Romania (PSDR) and the socialist-controlled labor movement on the other. The newspaper reported the official government position on the bloody confrontations between workers and Romanian Army troops in the city of Galați. Using a style Torrey describes as "inflammatory", Adevărul also attacked PSDR leader Christian Rakovsky, co-founder of the anti-interventionist and internationalist Zimmerwald Movement, accusing him of being an "adventurer" and hireling of the German Empire. In a 1915 letter to Zimmerwald promoter Leon Trotsky, Rakovsky himself claimed that Mille had been corrupted by Take Ionescu, leader of the pro-Entente Conservative-Democratic Party, and that his newspapers issued propaganda "under the mask of independence".

Romania eventually signed the 1916 Treaty of Bucharest, committing herself to the Entente cause. Its intervention in the war was nevertheless ill-fated, and resulted in the occupation of Bucharest and much of the surrounding regions by the Central Powers, with the Romanian authorities taking refuge in Iași. While Mille himself fled to Iași and later Paris, his newspapers were banned by the German authorities and the Sărindar headquarters became home to the German-language official mouthpiece, Bukarester Tageblatt. Brănișteanu, who did not join in the exodus, worked with Constantin Stere on the Germanophile paper Lumina. In early 1919, as the Germans lost the war, Mille returned and both Adevărul and Dimineața were again in print. In later years, Adevărul's Constantin Costa-Foru covered in detail and with noted clemency the trials of various "collaborationist" journalists, including some of its former and future contributors (Stere, Tudor Arghezi, Saniel Grossman). The newspaper was by then also reporting about Seton-Watson's disappointment with post-war Greater Romania and the centralist agenda of its founders.

=== 1919 edition ===
==== Early interwar years ====
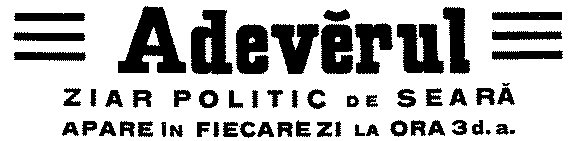
Adevĕrul logo, used in the interwar period. The subtitle reads: "Evening political newspaper. Appears each day at 3 PM"

Once reestablished, Adevărul became a dominant newspaper of the interwar period and preserved its formative role for popular culture, being joined in its leftist niche some other widely circulated periodicals (Cuvântul Liber, Rampa etc.). More serious competition came from its old rival Universul, which now surpassed it in popularity at a national level. By 1934, Adevărul and Dimineața still boasted a combined daily circulation of 150,000 copies.

In 1920, Mille retired from the position of editor-in-chief and moved on to create Lupta journal, amidst allegations that he had been pressured out by rival business interests. Adevărul and Dimineața were both purchased by Aristide Blank, a Romanian Jewish entrepreneur, National Liberal politician and owner of Editura Cultura Națională company. He sold the controlling stock to other prominent Jewish businessmen, Emil and Simion Pauker, reactivating the Adevĕrul S. A. holding in the process. Mille himself was replaced by Constantin Graur, who held managerial positions until 1936. Simion and Emil Pauker were, respectively, the father and uncle of Marcel Pauker, later a maverick figure in the outlawed Romanian Communist Party (PCR). The Paukers' ethnicity made their two newspapers preferred targets of attacks by the local antisemitic groups. In that decade, Adevărul was generally sympathetic to the National Peasants' Party, the main political force opposing the National Liberal establishment.

The paper employed a new generation of panelists, most of whom were known for their advocacy of left-wing causes. In addition to professional journalists Brănișteanu, Constantin Bacalbașa, Tudor Teodorescu-Braniște, they included respected novelist Mihail Sadoveanu and debuting essayist Petre Pandrea, as well as the best-selling fiction author Cezar Petrescu, who was briefly a member of the editorial staff. Other writers with socialist or pacifist sympathies also became collaborators of Adevărul and Dimineața, most notably: Elena Farago, Eugen Relgis, Ion Marin Sadoveanu and George Mihail Zamfirescu. Especially noted among the young generation of leftists was F. Brunea-Fox. After a stint as political editorialist with Adevărul, he became the Romanian "prince of reporters", with investigative journalism pieces which were mainly hosted by Dimineața.

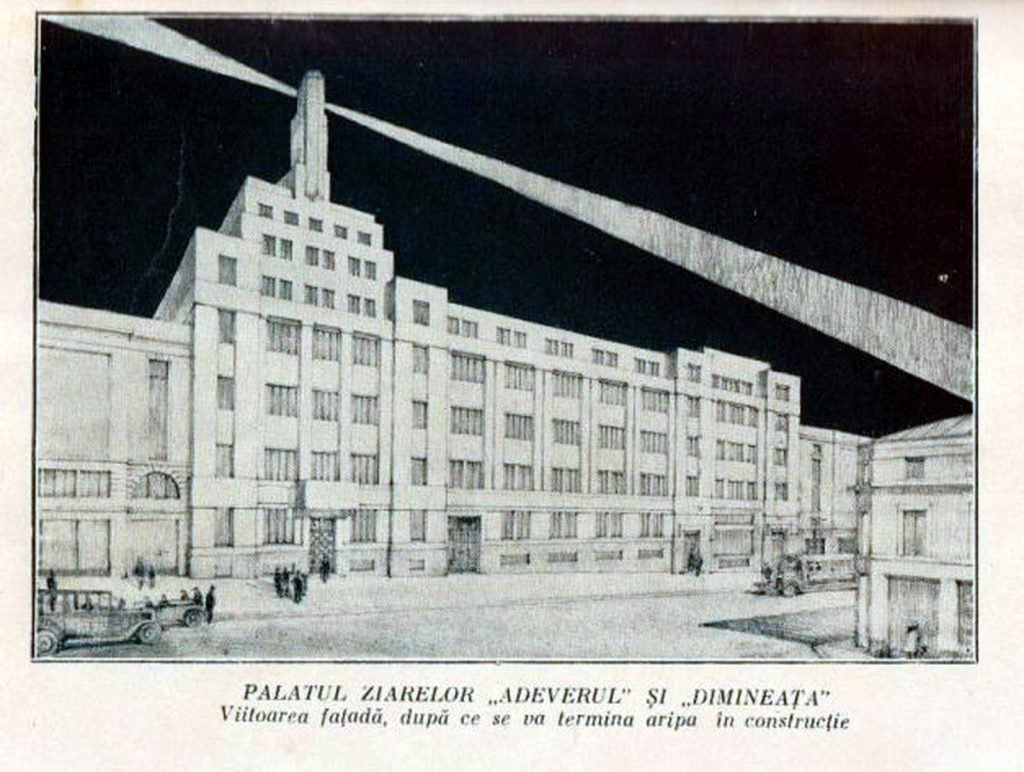
Adevărul headquarters, reinforced concrete addition (1930s), with Art Deco facade

Despite the effects of the Great Depression, the new management purchased another building in Sărindar area, tearing it down and replacing it with another palace wing, in reinforced concrete, and unifying the three facades by late 1933. The extended location, covering some 1,700 m^{2}, came to house a rotary printing press which was also in use by the magazine Realitatea Ilustrată, a conference hall, a cafeteria and sleeping quarters for the janitors. The post-1920 issues introduced a number of changes in format. It began hosting photojournalistic pieces by Iosif Berman, one of Romania's celebrated photographers (who had made his debut with Dimineața in 1913). Adevărul began headlining its front page with a short listing of the top news of the day, often accompanied by sarcastic editorial commentary.

Among the other innovations were regular columns discussing developments in literature and philosophy, written by two young modernist authors, Benjamin Fondane and Ion Vinea, as well as a theater chronicle by Fagure and Iosif Nădejde. Vinea's texts discussed literary authenticity, eclecticism, and consistent praises of modern lyrical prose. Other such articles followed Vinea's rivalry with his former colleague Tristan Tzara, and stated his rejection of Dadaism, a radical avant-garde current that Tzara had formed in Switzerland during the war. In 1922, Vinea went on to establish Contimporanul, an influential modernist and socialist tribune, which maintained warm contact with Adevărul. Around that time, Adevărul had a printing-press contract with Alexandru Tzaran, the socialist activist and entrepreneur, whose company also published avant-garde books, and revisited projects for creating a literary supplement. In 1920, it set up Adevĕrul Literar și Artistic, soon to be rated one of the prominent Romanian cultural journals. Seven years later, it also began printing a magazine for Romanian Radio enthusiasts, under the title Radio Adevĕrul.

The newspaper was involved in cultural debates over the following two decades. It attracted contributions from various cultural ideologists, among them critics șerban Cioculescu, Petru Comarnescu, Eugen Lovinescu and Paul Zarifopol, writers Demostene Botez, Eugeniu Botez, Victor Eftimiu, Eugen Jebeleanu and Camil Petrescu, and Aromanian cultural activist Nicolae Constantin Batzaria. Beginning 1928, Cioculescu took over the Adevărul literary column. That same year, Adevărul hosted part of the dispute between Cioculescu and another prominent critic of the period, Perpessicius, the former of whom accused the latter of being too eclectic and generous. In 1931, it circulated young critic Lucian Boz's defense of Tzara and praise for sculptor Constantin Brâncuși, both of whom, he stressed, had brought "fresh Romanian air into the realm of Western culture". By 1932, it was hosting contributions from George Călinescu, including one which criticized his former disciple Boz, and excerpts from Lovinescu's memoirs. In 1937, Adevărul hosted a polemic between Lovinescu and his disciple Felix Aderca, where the topic was avant-garde hero Urmuz, and a special column for women in culture. Probably conceived by feminist writer Izabela Sadoveanu-Evan (already known to Adevărul readers as a popularizer of English literature), it was signed by several prominent women of the day.

Editura Adevĕrul signed on some of the best-selling authors in modern Romanian literature, among them Sadoveanu, Călinescu, Eugeniu Botez, Liviu Rebreanu and Gala Galaction. It also put out several other popular works, such as memoirs and essays by Queen Marie of Romania, the comedic hit Titanic Vals by Tudor Mușatescu, and, after 1934, a number of primary school textbooks. By the mid-1930s, Adevărul had launched sister magazines dedicated to photo-reportage (Realitatea Ilustrată), Hollywood films (Film) and health (Medicul Nostru).

==== Clashes with the far right ====
Both Adevărul and Dimineața were noted for their rejection of interwar antisemitism, and for condemning the far right and fascist segment of the political spectrum. Romanian fascism was at the time grouped around the National-Christian Defense League (LANC), presided upon by Adevărul's old adversary A. C. Cuza. During 1921, the liberal Fagure ridiculed the supposed threat of Jewish communization in newly acquired Bessarabia, countering the supposed threat of Jewish Bolshevism (officially endorsed and publicized by Universul). At the time, Adevărul was even voicing criticism of Soviet Russia from the left: young Brunea-Fox discussed an anti-Soviet workers' rebellion as a movement for individual freedoms. In 1923, Adevărul publishing house printed a booklet by the leftist whistleblower Emanoil Socor, wherein proof was given that A. C. Cuza's academic career rested on plagiarism.

The same year, the LANC's entire paramilitary wing, including young activist Corneliu Zelea Codreanu, was rounded up by the authorities. These uncovered the fascists' plan to murder various National Liberal politicians, the editors of Lupta, and Adevărul manager Iacob Rosenthal. Adevărul later published the results of an investigation by anti-fascist reporter Dinu Dumbravă, who discussed LANC involvement in the 1925 pogrom of Focșani, and mentioned that the educational system was being penetrated by antisemites. In 1927, it joined the condemnation of LANC-sponsored violence in Transylvania: a contributor, the lawyer-activist Dem. I. Dobrescu, referred to Codreanu and his men as Romania's "shame". In December 1930, leftist sociologist Mihai Ralea, one of the main figures in the Viața Românească circle, chose Adevărul as the venue for his essay Răzbunarea noțiunii de democrație ("Avenging the Notion of Democracy"), which condemned the then-popular theory that democratic regimes were inferior to totalitarian ones. Adevărul reported with concern on some other conspiracies against the legitimate government, including officer Victor Precup's attempt to assassinate King Carol II on Good Friday 1934.

In parallel, Adevărul took an interest in promoting alternatives to nationalist theories. It thus attempted to mediate the ongoing disputes between Romania and Hungary, an editorial policy notably taken up in 1923, when the exiled Hungarian intellectual Oszkár Jászi visited Bucharest. In that context, Adevărul published Jászi's interview with Constantin Costa-Foru, wherein Jászi mapped out a Danubian Confederation scheme, criticizing "thoughts of war and sentiments of hatred" among both Romanians and Magyars. In another Adevărul piece, Jászi's vision was commended as a democratic alternative to the authoritarian Hungarian Regency regime, leading Hungarian Ambassador Iván Rubido-Zichy to express his displeasure. Later, even as Jászi arose the suspicions of many Romanians and was shunned by the Hungarian community in Romania, Adevărul still expressed sympathy for his cause, notably with a 1935 essay by Transylvanian journalist Ion Clopoțel. The newspaper also denounced interwar Germany's attempts to absorb Austria (a proto-Anschluss), primarily because they stood to channel Hungary's revanchism. It also reported with much sarcasm on the friendly contacts between the Romanian nationalists at LANC and the Hungarian revanchist Szeged Fascists. Meanwhile, Adevărul was vividly critical of centralizing policies in post-1920 "Greater Romania", primarily in Transylvania and Bessarabia. Articles on this topic were mainly contributed by Onisifor Ghibu, a former activist for the Transylvanian Romanian cause.

One of the new causes in which Adevărul involved itself after 1918 was birth control, which it supported from a eugenic perspective. This advocacy was foremost illustrated by the regular medical column of 1923, signed Doctor Ygrec (the pseudonym of a Jewish practitioner), which proposed both prenuptial certificates and the legalization of abortion. The issues attracted much interest after Ygrec and his counterpart at Universul, who expressed moral and social objections, debated the matter for an entire month. While voicing such concerns, Adevărul itself published prejudiced claims, such as a 1928 article by physician George D. Ionășescu, who portrayed the steady migration of Oltenian natives into Bucharest as a "social danger" which brought with it "promiscuity, squalor and infection", and called for restrictions on internal migration. Generally anti-racist, the paper helped publicize the alternative, anti-fascist racialism proposed by Henric Sanielevici in the 1930s. Adevărul also published a 1929 piece by Nicolae Constantin Batzaria, in which the latter showed his adversity to radical forms of feminism, recommending women to find their comfort in marriage.

By the mid-1930s, the tension between Adevărul and the increasingly pro-fascist Universul degenerated into open confrontation. Emil Pauker's newspapers were by then also being targeted by the new fascist movement known as the Iron Guard, led by former LANC member Codreanu: in 1930, one of its editors was shot by a follower of Codreanu, but escaped with his life. According to the recollections of PCR activist Silviu Brucan, the Iron Guardists, who supported Universul, attacked distributors of Adevărul and Dimineața, prompting young communist and socialists to organize themselves into vigilante groups and fight back, which in turn led to a series of street battles. Beginning 1935, the scandals also involved Sfarmă-Piatră, a virulent far right newspaper headed by Nichifor Crainic and funded by Stelian Popescu, the new publisher of Universul. While engaged in this conflict, Adevărul stood out among local newspapers for supporting the PCR during a 1936 trial of its activists which took place in Craiova, and involved as a co-defendant Simion Pauker's daughter-in-law, Ana Pauker. Mainstream politician Constantin Argetoianu, citing an unnamed Adevărul journalist, had it that Emil Pauker, otherwise an outspoken anti-communist, was trying to protect even the more estranged members of his family. With the change in management, some of the established Adevărul authors moved to Universul. This was the case with C. Bacalbașa (1935) and Batzaria (1936). In his Universul columns, the latter displayed a degree of sympathy for the extreme right movement.

In summer 1936, the Paukers sold their stock to a consortium of businessmen with National Liberal connections, which was headed by Emanoil Tătărescu, the brother of acting Premier Gheorghe Tătărescu. Mihail Sadoveanu succeeded Graur as editor-in-chief, while also taking over leadership of Dimineața, and Eugen Lovinescu became a member of the company's executive panel. With this change in management came a new stage in the conflict opposing Adevărul to the far right press. Through the voices of Crainic, Alexandru Gregorian and N. Crevedia, the two extremist journals Porunca Vremii and Sfarmă-Piatră repeatedly targeted Sadoveanu with antisemitic and antimasonic epithets, accusing him of having become a tool for Jewish interests and, as leader of the Romanian Freemasonry, of promoting occult practices. The controversy also involved modernist poet Tudor Arghezi, whose writings Sadoveanu defended against charges of "pornography" coming from the nationalist press. Adevărul did in fact back similar charges against novelist Mircea Eliade, who was in conflict with Teodorescu-Braniște, and whom Doctor Ygrec dismissed as an "erotomaniac".

=== 1946 edition ===
==== 1937 ban and recovery ====
Adevărul and Dimineața, together with Lupta, were suppressed in 1937, when the fascist National Christian Party of Octavian Goga, successor to the LANC and rival of the Iron Guard, took over government. This was primarily an antisemitic measure among several racial discrimination laws adopted with the consent of Carol II, the increasingly authoritarian monarch, and officially credited the notion according to which both venues were "Jewish". The decision to close down the publications was accompanied by a nationalization of their assets, which reportedly included a large part of Iosif Berman's negatives. In one of the paper's last issues, Teodorescu-Braniște warned against the identification of democracy "within the limits of constitutional monarchy" with Bolshevism, noting that Adevărul's enemies had willingly introduced such a confusion. In his diary of World War II events, Brănișteanu described the ban as having inaugurated the era of "barbarity". This referred to the bloody clash between Carol and the Iron Guard, to Goga's downfall, and to the establishment of a three successive wartime dictatorships: Carol's National Renaissance Front, the Guard's National Legionary State, and the authoritarian regime of Conducător Ion Antonescu.

The three regimes organized successive purges of Jewish and left-wing journalists, preventing several of the Adevărul employees from working in the field. During its episodic rise to power, the Iron Guard mapped out its revenge against people associated with Adevărul, dividing its former staff into three categories: "kikes", "traitors", and "minions". Nichifor Crainic, who served as Minister of Propaganda under both the National Legionary State and Antonescu, took pride in his own campaign against "Judaism" in the press, and, speaking at the 1941 anniversary of his tribune Gândirea, referred to Goga's 1937 action against Adevărul and the others as a "splendid act of justice". According to one story, the palatial office formerly belonging to Adevărul was still at the center of a conflict between underground communists and the Guard: during the Legionary Rebellion of January 1941, the PCR attempted to set it on fire and then blame the arson on the fascists, but this plan was thwarted by press photographer Nicolae Ionescu.

Both Adevărul and Dimineața were restored on April 13, 1946, two years since the August 1944 Coup ended Romania's alliance with Nazi Germany by bringing down Antonescu. The new editorial staff was led by the aging newspaperman Brănișteanu and the new collective owner was the joint stock company Sărindar S. A. The daily did not have its headquarters in Sărindar (which was allocated to the Luceafărul Printing House), but remained in the same general area, on Matei Millo Street and later on Brezoianu Street. In the first issue of its new series, Adevărul carried Brănișteanu's promise of pursuing the same path as Mille, and was accompanied by a reprint of Mille's political testament. Brănișteanu's article stated: "We did not and will not belong to any person, to any government, to any party." The series coincided with a spell of pluralism contested by the Soviet Union's occupation of Romania, the steady communization of stately affairs, and political moves to create a communist regime. Brănișteanu noted these developments in his debut editorial of 1946, with a positive spin: "We ought to be blind not to have admitted that, in these new times, new men must step and do step to the leadership. We do not shy away from saying that, in general lines, our views meet with those of socialist democracy, for the preparation of which we have been struggling our entire lives and which is about to be set up here, as well as in most parts of the European continent, after being fulfilled in Russia."

==== Communist censorship ====
Barbu Brănișteanu died in December 1947, just days before the Kingdom was replaced with a pro-Soviet people's republic in which the dominant force was the PCR. The gazette celebrated the political transition, publishing the official communique proclaiming the republic, and commenting on it: "A new face of Romanian history has begun [sic] yesterday. What follows is the Romanian state, which today, as well as tomorrow, will require everyone's disciplined and concentrated work." Honored with a front-page obituary, Brănișteanu was succeeded by H. Soreanu, who led Adevărul for the following two years. Soreanu was originally from the city of Roman, where he had presided over a local gazette.

In stages after that date, Adevărul was affected by communist censorship: according to historian Cristian Vasile, while generally infused with "official propaganda", the paper overall failed in effecting "the transformation requested by the [new] regime." Its content grew more politicized, offering praise to Soviet and Communist party initiatives such as the five-year plans, the encouragement and spread of atheism, and the promotion of Russian literature. Nevertheless, it continued to publish more traditional articles, including pieces signed by Brunea-Fox and poet Demostene Botez, as well as the regular columns Carnetul nostru ("Our Notebook"), Cronica evenimentelor externe ("The Chronicle of Foreign Events"), Cronica muzicală ("The Musical Chronicle"), Glose politice ("Political Glosses"), Ultima oră ("Latest News"), and the cartoon section Chestia zilei ("The Daily Issue"). Another satirical section, titled Tablete ("Tablets") and contributed by Tudor Arghezi, existed between 1947 and 1948; it came to an abrupt end when Arghezi was banned, having been singled out for his "decadent" poetry in Sorin Toma's ideological column for Scînteia, the main communist mouthpiece (see Socialist realism in Romania). In early 1948, Adevărul was also hosting some of the few independently voiced theater chronicles of the day, including a subversive contribution from the self-exiled author Monica Lovinescu, where she indirectly referred to communism as Kafkaesque experimentation.

The newspaper was eventually placed under an "editorial committee", whose effective leader was Communist Party boss Leonte Răutu, and whose mission was to prepare Adevărul for liquidation. In early 1951, at a time when the communist regime closed down all autonomous press venues, Adevărul was taken out of print. In its final issue (18,039th of March 31, 1951), the paper informed that: "the working class has set up a new press, emerging from the new development of society: a press for the masses, read and written by millions. [It] expresses the tendencies and higher level of socialist culture; it debates on a daily basis the problems of ideology, of social and political theory, of science and technology, in connection with the preoccupations, the struggles and the victories in the field of labor, intertwined with the vast issues posed by the effort of socialist construction. The mission of Adevĕrul newspaper is over." Cristian Vasile notes that the "official explanation" for suppressing Adevărul was "ridiculous and unconvincing." Indication that the closure occurred unexpectedly also comes from Adevărul's failure to cancel its subscriptions in advance.

=== 1989 edition ===
==== 1989 reestablishment and support for the FSN ====
A daily paper with the name Adevărul was again set up in the immediate aftermath of the 1989 Revolution, which had toppled the communist regime and its one-party system. The publication, which is housed by the House of the Free Press, is often described as a direct successor to the PCR organ Scînteia (rival of the 1940s Adevărul). Three intermediary issues were published during the actual revolutionary events; a free one-page issue on December 22 and two further issues on December 23 and 24 respectively, under the title Scînteia Poporului ("The People's Spark"), which published appeals issued by the provisional post-communist leadership forum, the National Salvation Front (FSN), adopting the name Adevărul starting December 25. As one of its first measures, the new editorial board dismissed members of the staff who were discredited for having openly supported the last communist ruler, Nicolae Ceaușescu, replacing them with journalists sympathetic to the FSN. Soon after Ceaușescu's execution, the gazette began serializing Red Horizons, a volume of recollections exposing the defunct regime, authored by Ion Mihai Pacepa, a defector and former spy chief. At the time, it circulated the claim, supported by the FSN, that Ceaușescu's repression of the popular revolt had killed as many as 60,000 people, which was a 60-fold increase of the actual death toll.

Edited after its resurgence by the pro-FSN poet and translator Darie Novăceanu, Adevărul became the dominant left-wing newspaper of post-communist Romania. In parallel, Dimineața was itself revived, and, although independent from Adevărul, was also a FSN mouthpiece. Their main right-wing rival was another former Communist Party venue, România Liberă, which openly reproached on the FSN that it was monopolizing power, and which identified itself with liberalism and pluralism. Reflecting back on the early 1990s, Southampton Institute researcher David Berry argued: "the ideological forces associated with the previous Stalinist regime were pitted against a much smaller and disparate oppositional group. This latter group was associated with România Liberă that loosely represented the voice of liberalism and [...] clearly lost the war. This was a battle of ideas and the old forces of Romanian communism used the new press framework, through Adevărul, to discredit opposition forces." In 1990, both papers reputedly sold around 1 million copies each day, a pattern attributed to "news deprivation" under communism, and believed by Berry to be "a phenomenal figure in comparison to any leading Western nation".

==== Târgu Mureș conflict and 1990 Mineriad ====
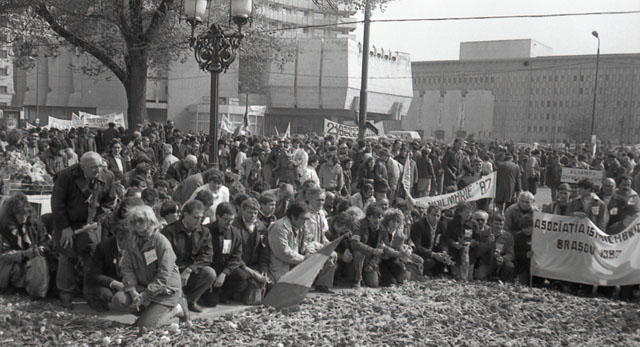
Protest in downtown Bucharest, 1990

In this context, Adevărul advertised that its main purpose was the dissemination of "nothing but the truth", of "exact information". The paper however stood out for promoting nationalist, populist and authoritarian concepts, which Berry has associated with the survival of previous national communist themes in FSN discourse. Such theses acquired particularly controversial representations during the violent Târgu Mureș riots of March 1990. Backing the official view according to which the ethnic Hungarian community was organizing itself in separatist struggle, it dedicated space to articles targeting the opposition Democratic Union of Hungarians (UDMR). Initially, Berry notes, Adevărul reported claims of extremist Hungarians in Transylvania committing vandalism against national monuments while acknowledging that the UDMR was not endorsing such acts, but slowly became a tribune for encouraging ethnic Romanians to take action, exclusively presenting its public with politicized and unmitigated information provided by the official agency Rompres and by the Romanian ultra-nationalist group Vatra Românească. Its editorials, often based on rumors, included negative portrayals of Hungarians, methods described by Berry as "extremely xenophobic", "unethical" and forms of "political manipulation".

Adevărul displayed constant hostility toward the Golaniad protests in Bucharest, which ranged for much of early 1990, and expressed praise for the Mineriad of June 13–15, 1990. During the latter, miners from the Jiu Valley, instigated by some of the officials, entered Bucharest and quashed the opposition's sit-in. Early on, the gazette called on the Romanian Police to forcefully evict the Golaniad demonstrators, whom it accused of encouraging "filth" and "promiscuity". It also depicted the Golaniad as a major conspiracy, mounted against a legitimate government by neofascist and Iron Guard groups. Together with the FSN's Azi, it commended the pro-government workers at IMGB, the heavy machinery works, who attempted to force out the crowds, depicting it as an answer to alleged student violence against Police operatives.

When the miners organized a definitive clampdown, depicted in Adevărul as a peaceful takeover, the newspaper was one of the several House of the Free Press operations left untouched by the Mineriad. During the following days, it published material praising the miners for reestablishing order, while alleging that "their presence was absolutely necessary to annihilate the violence of extremist forces". It also popularized false rumors according to which, during their attacks on the opposition National Peasant and National Liberal party headquarters, the miners had confiscated weapons, counterfeit money and illegal drugs. In addition to main editor Novăceanu, whose articles were congratulatory of "our miners", journalists who praised the Mineriad include Sergiu Andon (future Conservative Party politician), Cristian Tudor Popescu and Corina Drăgotescu.

Radical nationalism was observed in several Adevărul articles throughout the FSN period. In one piece of March 22, days after the main Hungarian-Romanian clashes, writer Romulus Vulpescu described the danger of "irredentism" and "Horthyism", alleging that local Hungarians had assassinated several Romanian peasants. Vulpescu and other contributors repeatedly made unverifiable claims according to which Hungary was directly involved in stirring resentments, allegations also made by the state-controlled television network. According to Romanian-born historian Radu Ioanid, in 1990–1991 Adevărul and its opponent Dreptatea of the anti-FSN National Peasants' Party both "joined the anti-Semitic barrage" of the period, a trend he believes was instigated by the publications of Corneliu Vadim Tudor, Iosif Constantin Drăgan and Eugen Barbu (all of them affiliated with România Mare magazine). Ioanid singled out Adevărul and its collaborator Cristian Tudor Popescu, who, during the July 1991 commemoration of the Iași pogrom, attacked writer Elie Wiesel and other Holocaust researchers for having evidenced Ion Antonescu's complicity in extermination. In the early 1990s, Adevărul also stood out for its intense republicanism which opposed the return of communist-deposed King Michael I, and published polemical pieces such as the Fir-ai al naibii, majestate ("Curse You, Your Majesty", written by Andon).

==== The privatization years ====
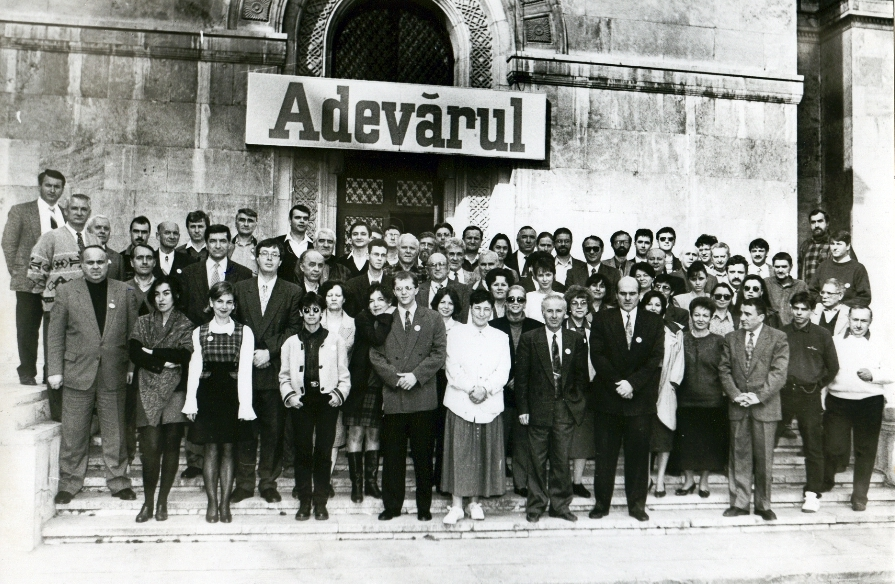
Adevărul staff in the early to mid-1990s. Dumitru Tinu, Cristian Tudor Popescu, Adrian Ursu etc. in the foreground

A scandal surfaced in spring 1991, when Adevărul was caught up in the first wave of privatization, following a decision of the FSN's Petre Roman cabinet. A conflict reportedly opposed Novăceanu to Popescu: the latter suspected a secret understanding between Roman and the Adevărul leadership, providing for a facade privatization and transferring financial control to FSN politicians. This controversy ended only when Premier Roman appointed Novăceanu as Romanian Ambassador to Spain. The Scînteia patrimony was afterward divided between Adevărul and the state. In parallel, seeking to consolidate their publications' independence, the writing staff set up a joint stock company, Adevărul Holding. Known initially as SC Adevărul SA, it had its initial public offering distributed through the "MEBO method" of employee buyouts. As a result, the journalists owned 60% and other employees the other 40%, with a clause forbidding them from selling to outside investors (in effect until 2002). Subsequent trading within the holding and seasoned equity offerings provided the editorial staff with a controlling stock of approx. 30%. As part of its business profile, the post-privatization Adevărul also earned criticism for not differentiating between articles and commercial content, publishing covert advertisements as opinion pieces. Also at that stage, allegations surfaced that, through a firm known as SC Colosal Import-Export, members of the editorial staff, including Andon, Viorel Sălăgean and Dumitru Tinu, were handling all the larger advertising revenues.

Occasionally, nationalist claims produced by Adevărul parted with the policies of FSN's Social Democratic (PSD) successors, particularly in matters relating to social issues and Romania's economy. In June 1993, the gazette attacked the PSD's Nicolae Văcăroiu cabinet for its privatization measures, claiming that the sale of the Petromin shipping firm to Greek investors was done "at a pittance", and calling on the government to resign. This campaign, British political scientist Judy Batt notes, had a "xenophobic tinge", and its appeal "has shaken confidence in the government and eroded its capacity for action." After the post-Revolution authorities announced their intention to join the European Union and accepted a monitoring process, the newspaper hosted the first in a long series of Euroskeptic pieces, which generally objected to outside intervention, particularly in the area of human rights, and were often signed by columnists Popescu and Bogdan Chireac. British academic and observer Tom Gallagher attributes this attitude to claims of "injured patriotism". In parallel, Adevărul displayed a strong socially conservative agenda. During those years, the paper published numerous pieces covering Romanian society, which were primarily noted for their sensationalist and alarmist headlines, such as a claim, published in 1997, that "a quarter of Romania's children live in institutions". In early 1996, Adevărul was noted for criticizing local non-governmental organizations promoting women's rights, alleging that, although financed by the European Union's Phare fund, they only functioned on paper (an attitude which itself earned criticism for sexism). More debates ensued in March 1998, when Cristian Tudor Popescu published an Adevărul article under the title Femeia nu e om ("The Woman Is Not a Human Being", or "The Woman Is Not a Man"), where he alleged that women cannot think. Another controversy of the mid-1990s also involved Popescu, criticized for his Adevărul articles which, claiming freedom of thought as their motivation, supported the cause of convicted French Holocaust denier Roger Garaudy.

A political scandal touched Adevărul some time after the 1996 legislative election, when the Social Democrats' rivals from the Democratic Convention, Democratic Party and other opposition groups formed government. This came after the new Foreign Minister, Adrian Severin, publicly stated being in possession of a list comprising the names of several leading Romanian journalists who were agents of the Russian Federal Security Service. Even though Severin's failure to evidence the claim resulted in his resignation, the list fueled much speculation, including rumors that Dumitru Tinu, by then one of the main Adevărul editors, was one of the people in question. The dispute prolonged itself over the following decade, particularly after Tinu's name was again used by President Emil Constantinescu and former Foreign Intelligence Service director Ioan Talpeș in their recollections of the Severin incident.

==== Late 1990s emancipation ====
Various commentators have noted a rise in the newspaper's informative quality later in the 1990s. Among them is British politician and MEP Emma Nicholson, who followed Romania's political scene throughout the decade. She singled out Adevărul and Romania's other major central daily, Evenimentul Zilei, as "high quality publications". Writing in 2002, Romanian media researcher Alex Ulmanu rated Adevărul "the most successful, and arguably the best Romanian daily". Romanian sociologist and political commentator Marian Petcu sees its enduring popularity as the consequence of a "head start", with Adevărul having inherited from Scînteia "the facilities, the subscribers, the raw materials, the headquarters, the superstructure, the network of local correspondents etc." He also notes that the newer publication had produced a "less warlike and less anti-communist" discourse than those of other dailies, and therefore appealing to a wider audience. By 2004, Petcu argues, Adevărul maintained a "balance between a reconciliatory but well documented discourse, on the one hand, and, on the other, the observance of journalistic norms and resistance to the temptation to make compromises."

According to surveys carried out around 2004, the paper was being perceived as the most credible title. Its circulation reached a reported 150,000 copies a day, making it one of at most four local dailies to print more than 100,000, and maintaining its lead over all local newspapers, directly above Evenimentul Zilei and Libertatea. Other data for 2003 places that number at approx. 200,000, roughly equal to that of Evenimentul Zilei, and ranking above Libertatea and Cotidianul (with 140,000 and 120,000 copies respectively). According to Evenimentul Zilei, the circulation of Adevărul actually dropped from 200,000 in 1998–2000 to 100,000 in the post-2001 era, whereas external auditors revealed that, in 2003, it was the fifth most-read newspaper (after Libertatea, Evenimentul Zilei, Pro Sport and Gazeta Sporturilor). Alongside Evenimentul Zilei and Pro Sport, Adevărul was also one of the first Romanian periodicals to take an interest in putting out an online edition and adopting innovations in web design, making its site the third most popular of its kind in 2002 (the year of its relaunch).

Both Tinu and Popescu helped consolidate their publication's reputation through their numerous television appearances, coming to be seen as leaders of opinion. According to Petcu, the public's confidence was what made Adevărul "autonomous from the political power", while Nicholson attributes such progress to Popescu, whom she sees as "a journalistic icon". At the end of the transition, Petcu assessed the new Adevărul agenda as one in favor of social justice, social security and "fast privatization that would avoid massive unemployment". At the time, the paper's panelists also threw their support behind European integration, a change in political orientation illustrated by Chireac's talk show on Pro TV station, titled Pro Vest ("Pro West"). In 2003, Popescu was a co-founder and, after România Liberă editor Petre Mihai Băcanu withdrew from the race, first president of the Romanian Press Club, a professional association whose mission was setting ethical standards in journalism.

Despite such gestures, the paper continued to withstand accusations that it was itself unprofessional. Ulmanu argued that both Adevărul and its smaller competitor Curentul were examples of press striving to be considered "high quality", but noted: "However, one can still find biased, unprofessional or sensationalist reporting in these papers." Disputes also surround its political agenda of the 2000–2004 period. Like the other mainstream publications, Adevărul supported the PSD-backed Ion Iliescu in the presidential election runoff of late 2000, against the ultra-nationalist rival of the Greater Romania Party, Corneliu Vadim Tudor. In this context, it notably published a piece questioning Tudor's self-identification as a firm adherent of Romanian Orthodoxy, suggesting that he presented himself to foreigners as a Baptist Union adherent.

Opinions vary about the gazette's relationship with the PSD after the 2000 legislative election, which consecrated the socialists' return in government. Some commentators see Adevărul as a staunch critic of the resulting cabinet and of PSD policy-maker Adrian Năstase. However, journalist and academic Manuela Preoteasa highlights the PSD's "pressure on the media", and includes Adevărul among venues which, "apparently critical toward PSD [...] avoided criticizing some of the party leaders". In Marian Petcu's view, Adevărul adopted "a discourse stressing the need for prudence and balance, alternated with criticism of the political power whenever the latter failed to take firm decisions."

==== Changes in management ====
Adevărul also consolidated financial transparency, when the new editorial board, extended to include newcomers Chireac, Lelia Munteanu and Adrian Ursu, took over the role of supervisor in matters of advertising. In 2001–2003, Tinu purchased most stock owned by his colleagues, and came to own over 70% of the total shares, of which some 10% were purchased from Popescu in exchange for 140,000 United States dollars. Suspicions arose that Tinu was being secretly financed in this effort by the Jordanian businessman Fathi Taher, already known for purchasing much advertisement space in Adevărul during the mid-1990s, and receiving additional support from PSD politician and entrepreneur Viorel Hrebenciuc. According to a 2003 analysis in Ziarul Financiar, Adevărul was considered for purchase by the French group Hachette, and later by a Polish conglomerate.

In 2003, Tinu died in a car crash. The circumstances of his death, especially the technical details and the alleged financial benefits for third-parties, raised much speculation that he had been in fact murdered. His estate, including his majority stock, was inherited by his daughter, Ana-Maria, but her ownership was contested by the Iucinu family (his secret mistress and her son by Tinu). Their interests were defended in court by former panelist Andon, owner of some 2% of the stock. The editorial board's opposition to the administrative reshuffling proposed by Ana-Maria Tinu also created a lengthy conflict, and prevented her from assuming administrative control of the paper. It was alleged that, at the time of his death, Tinu was considering rebranding and restructuring, and that, in 2004, the newspaper's profits were only 9% of its total income.

A major crisis took place in 2005, when Popescu resigned from the board and was followed by 50 of his colleagues, all of whom set up a new daily, Gândul. In one of his last Adevărul pieces, titled Atacul guzganului rozaliu ("The Attack of the Pink Rat"), Popescu accused Hrebenciuc of having imposed his control on the newspaper during the local elections of 2004, when he allegedly pressured journalists not to criticize the PSD Mayor of Bacău, Dumitru Sechelariu. Also according to Popescu, Hrebenciuc had urged him and his colleagues to feature more negative and less positive coverage of the PSD rival and Democratic Party candidate Traian Băsescu during the presidential suffrage of November 2004. Atacul guzganului rozaliu also alleged that Ana-Maria Tinu had an understanding with the PSD politician, and her rebranding of Adevărul was Hrebenciuc's attempt to undermine its political independence. According to writer and analyst Cristian Teodorescu, the "pink rat" label stuck, and Hrebenciuc's influence on the newspaper suffered as a result.

Although Gândul attracted a large following during a number of months, turning a profit in the first month, Adevărul survived the shock. A similar crisis with similar outcomes had affected its rival Evenimentul Zilei in 2004, when the policies of new owners Ringier forced the resignation of editor Cornel Nistorescu and the migration of many staff members toward Cotidianul. Nicholson attributes the survival in both cases to the value of a well-established brand. In 2006, Ana-Maria Tinu sold her share of Adevărul Holding to one of Romania's richest entrepreneurs, the National Liberal politician Dinu Patriciu, her move hotly contested by Tinu's son Andrei Iucinu, who looked set to gain a third of the stock and trademark ownership upon the end of a trial. Patriciu's decisions, including his appointment of a new managerial team, were resisted by Corina Drăgotescu, who resigned and left the newspaper in November 2006.

According to data made available by the Romanian Audit Bureau of Circulations, the newspaper's circulation for 2008 ranged between a minimum monthly average of 37,248 copies in January and a maximum one of 109,442 in December. In 2009, the minimum was at 81,388 and the maximum at 150,061. A 2009 article in the rival newspaper Financiarul suggested that Adevărul was being neglected by Patriciu, who invested more in the holding (allegedly in hopes of undermining a trademark which he risked losing, while elevating the publications not affected by Iucinu's claim). However, by mid-2011, even as Romania's print media experienced major setbacks, the paper expanded in content and the holding enlarged its portfolio.

==== Post-2000 editorial policy and controversies ====
Despite the changes in attitude and management, some of the post-2000 editions of Adevărul remained controversial for their nationalist claims. This was primarily the case of statements it made in regard to the Romani minority, over which it has been repeatedly accused of antiziganism. In early 2002, the gazette reacted strongly against an advertisement for a soccer match between the Romania team and the France national team, where the former was being portrayed as a violinist. Adevărul saw this as an attempt to insult Romanians by associating them with Romani music, concluding: "Our French 'brothers' never stop offending us, and they seem to enjoy treating us like gypsies". A November 2008 article, which claimed to be based on a reportage piece first published in El País, depicted Romani Romanians as a leading demographic group within Madrid's organized crime networks. The article was condemned by civil society observers, who uncovered that Adevărul had modified and editorialized the original piece, which actually spoke of the Romanian immigrant population, without any mention of ethnicity. An analysis made by researchers Isabela Merilă and Michaela Praisler found that, in contrast to Evenimentul Zilei, Adevărul had a socially conservative bias in reporting on the rise of Romanian hip hop, which it related to negative social phenomena (violence, drug use), and against which it favored a degree of censorship.

Colecția Adevărul, the post-2008 book collection issued with the newspaper, has itself been at the center of a controversy. Two trials were opened on charges of plagiarism, after the collection issued works by Leo Tolstoy and Vintilă Corbul, allegedly without respecting the authorship rights of original translators. Another such conflict was sparked in April 2009, opposing Colecția Adevărul to Biblioteca pentru toți ("Everyman's Library"), a similar book series issued by the rivals at Jurnalul Național and Editura Litera. This came after Adevărul went ahead of Biblioteca pentru toți in reissuing George Călinescu's Enigma Otiliei novel. The Romanian Academy's George Călinescu Institute, which claims the copyright to Călinescu's books, joined Editura Litera in a lawsuit against Adevărul. In reply, Adevărul accused Jurnalul Național itself of having usurped the Biblioteca pentru toți brand, previously owned by Editura Minerva. It also spoke out against Antena 1, a television station which, like Jurnalul Național, is owned by Intact Group, accusing it of mudslinging.

In the months leading up to the 2009 presidential election, Adevărul launched a special nation-wide advertising campaign, announcing that it was reducing to a minimum its coverage of the political scene and would not host campaign ads, directly appealing to people who were declaring themselves disgusted with the election process. The initiative was covered by journalist Gabriel Giurgiu in the cultural magazine Dilema Veche, which is also part of the Adevărul Holding. Giurgiu's article was a mixed review: it argued that the reaction was understandable, but "regrettable", because it carried the risk of glamorizing voter fatigue and depriving society of "a necessary burden." Hotnews.ro owner and columnist Dan Tăpalagă placed this stance in connection to Dinu Patriciu's publicized adversity toward incumbent President Băsescu. In his view, Patriciu stood alongside Intact Group owner Dan Voiculescu and Realitatea-Cațavencu's Sorin Ovidiu Vântu as one of the "media moguls" working to prevent Băsescu' reelection. Alluding to the newspaper's promotional offers of cartoon classics on DVD and popular novels, Tăpalagă concluded: "[Adevărul] readers must be forcefully kept away from politics, perhaps kept busy with Tom and Jerry. Forcefully saturated of politics, the citizen in Patriciu's dreams gobbles up the personal governments concocted together with Voiculescu and Vântu, reads approximate literature and watches animated cartoons."

However, similar criticism of Adevărul was also voiced from within Realitatea-Cațavencu. Cornel Nistorescu, the new editor of Cotidianul, called the promotion "lobotomizing", and, contrary to Tapalagă, suggested that it had been induced by President Băsescu, to whom he attributed the power of ordering Patriciu's arrest on allegations of white-collar crime: "It is as if Traian Băsescu had sent him the message: write one more line about me, and you'll be spending another week in the big house!" Another Cotidianul contributor, Costi Rogozanu, referred to the Adevărul message as "a strange manipulation" and "a dangerous invitation to carelessness", noting that Romanian society was becoming divided between openly partisan media outlets and venues that avoided all mention of politics.

Additionally, the newspaper became focused on exploring the history of Romanian communism, and ran exposes on the Ceaușescu family. This interest (seen by Rogozanu as obsessive) was criticized as sensationalist, particularly after Adevărul circulated claims that the former dictator had been a youthful homosexual.

==== 2011 crisis ====
Several months after the elections, in mid-2010, the issue of editorial policies came up again, as a group of panelists walked out from the daily, citing worries that Dinu Patriciu was imposing his own agenda. Although initially supportive of this move, some, most notably Grigore Cartianu, Ovidiu Nahoi and Adrian Halpert, revised their decision and stayed on with Adevărul.

Under new management, Adevărul also acquired a new core group of columnists, including Patriciu himself. The owner's opinion pieces illustrate his commitment to libertarianism and the free market, which have little echo inside his own National Liberal Party. The other authors stood for a wide range of opinions, including anti-Patriciu stances. In February 2011, Adevărul even hosted an extended political debate between Patriciu and another columnist, the former cabinet minister and Băsescu advisor Andrei Pleșu. In December, Pleșu gave up his column in Adevărul, citing the accumulated frustration of working under an (unnamed) editor. Romanian media pioneer Ion Cristoiu made news in 2012, when he was in the unique position of writing for both Adevărul and rival Evenimentul Zilei.

In May 2011, Patriciu transferred 99.92% of Adevărul Holding stocks to another firm in his portfolio, Fast Europe Media N.V. (registered in the Netherlands). Patriciu himself justified the move as an opener of the Central and Eastern European markets, but analysts have also seen in this an attempt to capitalize on the Dutch corporate tax. The effects of the Great Recession were felt throughout Romanian mass-media, putting a check on Adevărul growth, and stabilizing its circulation at some 30,000 copies per issue. An advertising campaign for the newspaper, managed through Patriciu's firm Odyssey Communication, failed to reverse that trend, and Odyssey itself registered for bankruptcy.
