= Brezoaia (disambiguation) =

Brezoaia may refer to:

- Brezoaia, a commune in Ştefan Vodă district, Moldova
- Brezoaia, a village in Brezoaele Commune, Dâmboviţa County, Romania
- Brezoaia River, a tributary of the Oituz River in Romania
