= Regular army =

Official army of a state or country

A regular army is the official army of a state or country (the official armed forces), contrasting with irregular forces, such as volunteer irregular militias, private armies, mercenaries, etc. A regular army usually has the following:

- a standing army, the permanent force of the regular army that is maintained under arms during peacetime.
- a military reserve force that can be mobilized when needed to expand the effectiveness of the regular army by complementing the standing army.

A regular army may be:

- a conscript army, including professionals, volunteers and also conscripts (presence of enforced conscription, including recruits for the standing army and also a compulsory reserve).
- a professional army, with no conscripts (absence of compulsory service, and presence of a voluntary reserve), is not exactly the same as a standing army, as there are standing armies both in the conscript and the professional models.

In the United Kingdom and the United States, the term Regular Army means the professional standing active duty army, as different from the reserve component: the Army Reserve (formerly the Territorial Army) in the United Kingdom and the U.S. Army Reserve and the Army National Guard in the United States.
