= Oleg Voronin =

Moldovoan businessman born in 1962

- Born: November 4, 1962 (age 63); Criuleni, Moldavian SSR, Soviet Union
- Citizenship: Moldova
- Education: Moldova State University
- Occupation: Businessperson
- Political party: Party of Communists of the Republic of Moldova
- Children: 2
- Parent(s): Vladimir Voronin; Taisia Mihailovna
- Relatives: Isidor Sârbu (great grandfather)

Oleg Voronin (born 4 November 1962) is a Moldovan businessman and the son of former president Vladimir Voronin.

== Biography ==
Oleg Voronin born on November 4, 1962, in Criuleni, then in the Moldovan SSR. He is the son of former Moldovan president Vladimir Voronin and Taisia Mihailovna; Isidor Sârbu is the great-grandfather of Oleg.

== Education ==
He started elementary studies at Dubăsari School, no. 2 but graduated from Ungheni School, no. 4. In 1984, he graduated as a biology major from the Moldova State University.

He graduated also the Russian Presidential Academy of National Economy and Public Administration, "Municipal and State Administration" specialty, qualification "economist -specialist in finance and credit".

== Professional activity ==
Oleg Voronin got his first job with a non-profit called AŞP "Vierul". In 1988, he established with some other academics a Laboratory Cooperative to look for better yields in milk production. In 1992 became director of "Metal-Market" (constructions) and "Transline" (railroad transportation).

In 1993 Oleg Voronin applied for a banking license. Since that year, he has been head of his own bank, FinComBank, which has now grown into becoming one of Moldova's largest and most powerful financial institution.

In 2010, Voronin was appointed to the post of economic adviser to Moscow Mayor Yury Luzhkov.

He is the owner of several of the largest businesses in Moldova. These include, but are not limited to:

- FinComBank - served during 2001-2009 accounts of Moldtelecom (the national phone company), Internal Minister, the Secretary of Defense, the Secretary of Finance and the Chancellor of State.
- "Metal-market" - Construction Firm.
- "Transline" - Transportation

== Political activity ==
In 2011, Oleg Voronin joined the Party of Communists of the Republic of Moldova, led by his father.
