= Adrian Ursu =

Romanian journalist

Adrian Ursu (born on 9 August 1969) is a Romanian journalist. Born in Slatina, he graduated from the Literature Faculty of the University of Bucharest in 1994, having been expelled from its Journalism Faculty the previous year. His journalistic work began in 1992, when he joined the staff of Adevărul newspaper. There, he reported on the activities of the Romanian Parliament, was an investigative journalist, and spent time as a war correspondent covering Iraq, Afghanistan and the former Yugoslavia (including Kosovo). He advanced to become head of the politics department and assistant editor in chief before leaving the paper. From 2005 until December 2007, he was editor in chief of the new Gândul. In 2008, he joined Cotidianul's editorial council. Later that year, he became the newspaper's editor in chief, departing from that position in 2009 to become editorial director of Realitatea TV, and from the editorial council shortly thereafter when it was disbanded. He has produced shows on Romanian Television and Radio România Actualităţi, and co-hosted the daily talk show Ora de foc (previously anchoring Oamenii Realităţii) and the weekly Eurosceptici on Realitatea TV.
