= Gandul =

Gandul may refer to:

- Pigeon pea
- Gândul, a Romanian daily newspaper.
- Valkyrie, Gandul being one of the three most powerful valkyries.
