= Adevărul Holding =

- Industry: Media
- Founder: Dinu Patriciu
- Headquarters: Bucharest, Romania
- Key people: Răzvan Corneţeanu (General Director); Adrian Halpert (Editing Director)
- Products: Adevărul, Adevărul Literar şi Artistic, Blik, Click!, Dilema Veche, Dilemateca, Foreign Policy Romania

Adevărul Holding is a media joint stock company founded by Romanian businessman and politician Dinu Patriciu and named after its main publication, the daily newspaper Adevărul. In 2012 the company was sold to Romanian millionaire Cristian Burci. It currently owns newspapers and magazines, and has a television license. In addition to its main trademark Adevărul, its cultural supplement Adevărul Literar şi Artistic and other related media, the holding owns the daily tabloid Click!, the cultural weekly Dilema Veche and its sister magazine Dilemateca, the international policy magazine Foreign Policy Romania, and the Romanian edition of Forbes magazine. Adevărul Holding also owns Blik, a tabloid published in Ukraine.

Adevarul Holding was founded in 5 september 2006 by ROMPETROL HOLDING S.A, with Dan Costache Patriciu being elected as a director. It has since entered insolvency in 2012, and is currently in the process of being reorganized.

The company closed down operations of the Romanian edition of Forbes in 2012 amidst Patriciu's efforts to sell Adevărul Holding to Cristian Burci.

== Financials ==
The company financials, updated as of 2022, based on the reports submitted by ADEVARUL HOLDING S.R.L. to the ministry of finance.

Years	Revenues	Expenses	Profit	Inventory	Reserves	Receivables	Payables	Bank and Cash	Employees
2021	38644296	49934881	-11990656	521862	5593010	10010606	92213628	6177897	169
2020	43272781	39355854	2987940	734000	5346470	24739976	95622094	5680493	174
2019	49006873	47305536	1071054	470619	5145749	26274871	96845578	1438403	213
2018	338558539	37139482	300368735	504216	5451441	24569423	98176729	2131975	231
2017	93718915	48792016	44576731	912019	4965735	16332257	385842190	1270543	241
2016	57191514	61090435	-5298033	675573	5344938	15674421	430417453	1572056	150
