= Liberty Bank (Georgia) =

Georgian private bank

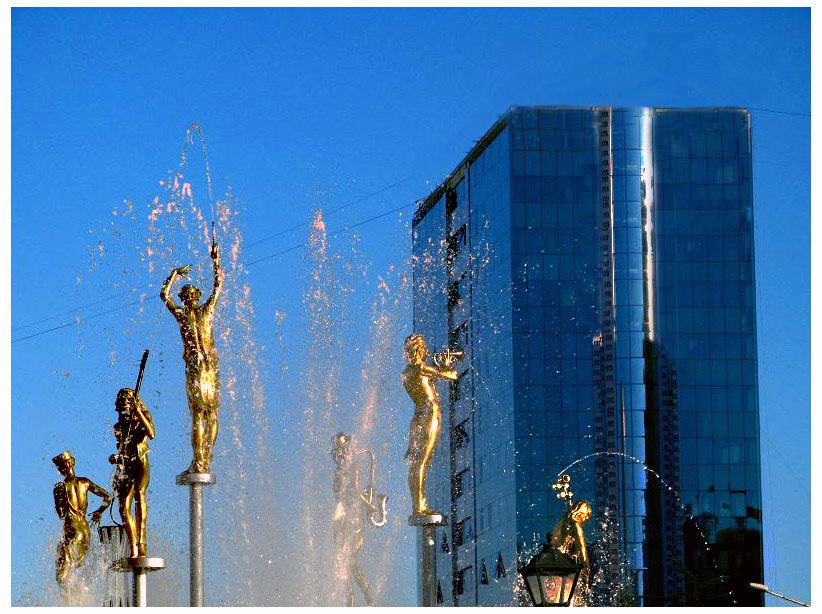
- Liberty Bank headquarters at Chavchavadze avenue, Tbilisi
- Type: Joint Stock Company
- Traded as: GeSE: BANK
- Industry: Banking, Financial services
- Founded: 1994
- Founder: Lado Gurgenidze, Dinu Patriciu
- Headquarters: Tbilisi, Georgia
- Website: www.libertybank.ge/en

The Liberty Bank (Georgian: ლიბერთი ბანკი, libert'i banki), formerly the People's Bank of Georgia (Georgian: საქართველოს სახალხო ბანკი, sak'art'velos sakhalkho banki) is a private bank in Georgia, the third largest in the country by total assets with 5.6% market share as of June 2017. It has the largest network of branches in Georgia.

== History ==
Liberty Bank is the successor to the state-owned "AgroMretsvBank" which was privatised in 1994 and renamed to "People's Bank of Georgia" in 2002.

The People's Bank of Georgia had the largest customer service network in Georgia. Under the leadership of George Goguadze, the Bank opened 210 branches across the country. As Goguadze's strategy was to establish extensive coverage around the country, the Bank was able to win a state tender for the rights of issuance of pensions and other social benefits. At the end of 2008, which was the last year of Goguadze's executive operation at the JSC People's Bank, the Bank had 1.5 million clients, which represent about 30% of the entire population of Georgia.

In September 2009, 91.2% of its shares were acquired by Liberty Investments Holding B.V., a newly established joint venture of Georgia's former Prime Minister, Lado Gurgenidze and Romanian tycoon Dinu Patriciu, while the bank was renamed Liberty Bank.

In 2017, Liberty Bank announced a change of control, whereby European Financial Group B.V., a company under the laws of the Netherlands, purchased 74.64% of equity interest in the Bank. The ultimate beneficial owners of the Bank are Irakli Rukhadze (US citizen), Ben Marson (UK citizen) and Igor Alexeev (US citizen).
