= Constantin Tănase (journalist) =

Moldovan journalist and politician (1949–2014)

Constantin Tănase OR
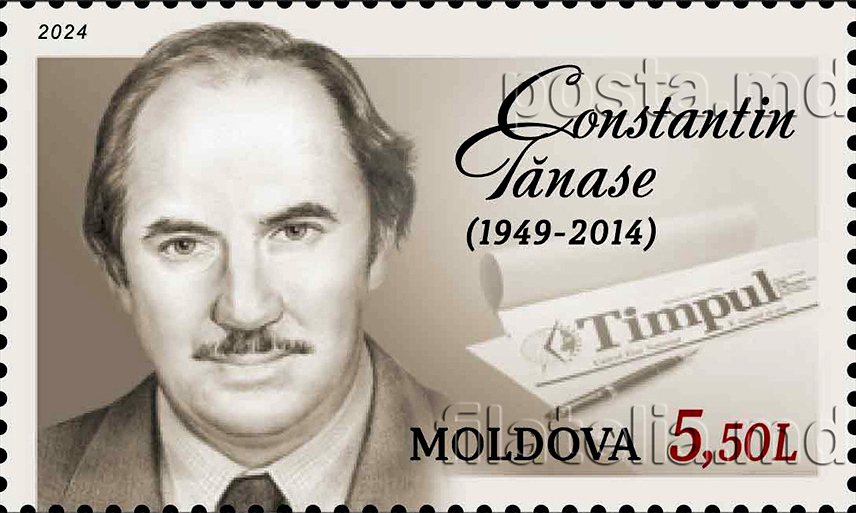
- Tănase on a 2024 stamp of Moldova

Member of the Moldovan Parliament
- In office 17 April 1990 – 29 March 1994
- Parliamentary group: Popular Front
- Constituency: Hîncești

Personal details
- Born: 24 June 1949 Nemţeni, Moldavian SSR, Soviet Union
- Died: 30 October 2014 (aged 65) Chișinău, Moldova
- Party: Popular Front of Moldova
- Children: Alexandru Tănase; Silviu Tănase
- Profession: Journalist

Constantin Tănase (24 June 1949 – 30 October 2014) was a journalist and former politician from Moldova, member of the Moldovan Parliament between 1990 and 1994.

== Biography ==
Tănase was the director of the Timpul de dimineață. Timpul de dimineață disfavored, directly or indirectly, the Party of Communists of the Republic of Moldova and the Christian-Democratic People's Party (Moldova).

He was a leader of the Democratic Forum of Romanians in Moldova.

== See also ==
- Union of Journalists of Moldova
