= Dumitru Tinu =

Romanian journalist

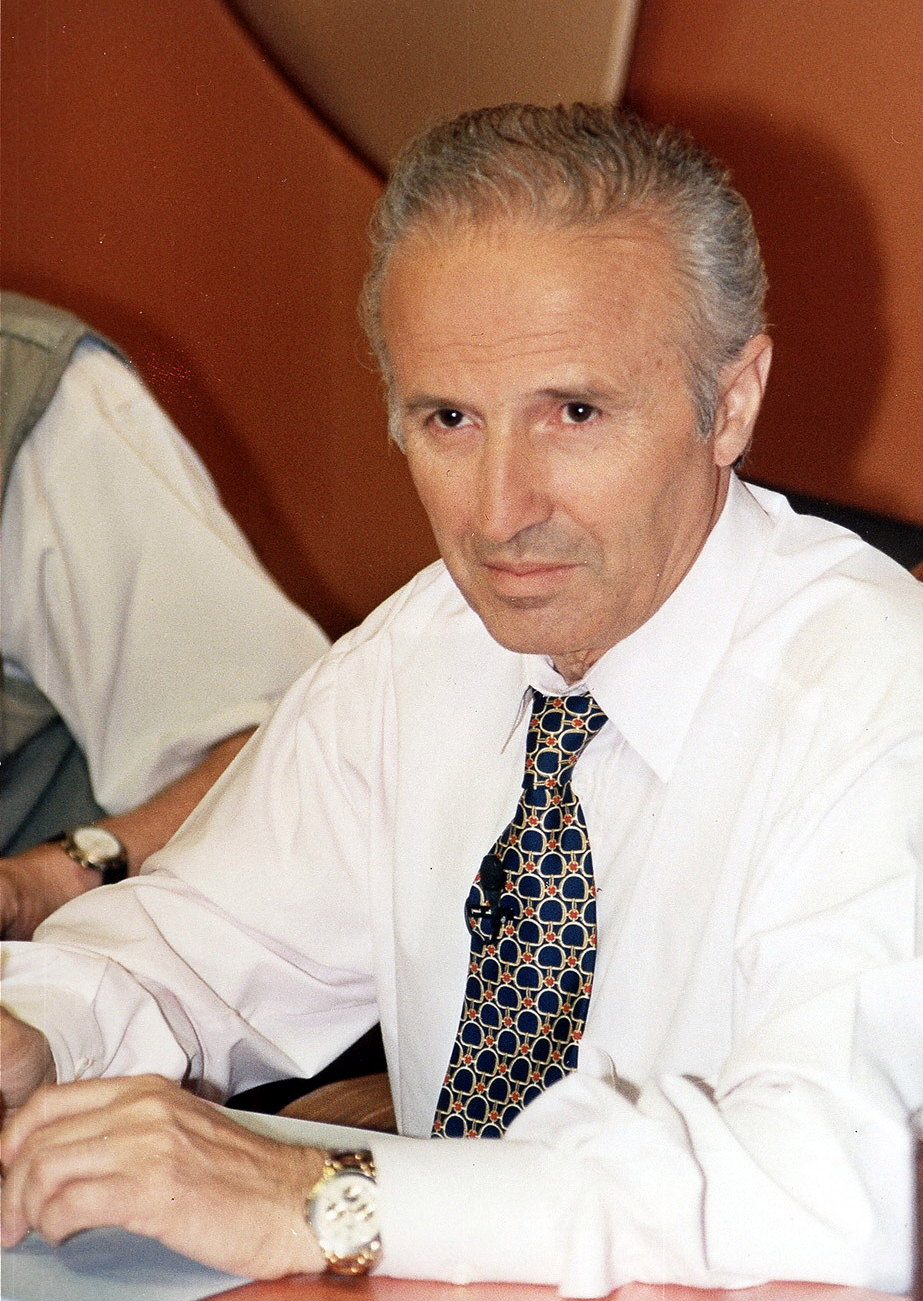
Dumitru Tinu

Dumitru Tinu (October 21, 1940 — January 1, 2003) was a Romanian journalist, director of Adevărul newspaper and president of the Romanian Press Club. He died under questionable circumstances in the early hours of New Year's Day 2003 in a car crash that aroused a number of theories in the media. His son from a previous relationship, Andrei Tinu, is a politician.
