= Isidor Sârbu =

Soviet Romanian farmer (1887–1980)

Isidor Sârbu, also known as Sîrbu (1887–1980), was a victim of dekulakization in the Moldavian Autonomous Soviet Socialist Republic (MASSR). Of Romanian heritage, Sârbu was born a citizen of the Russian Empire in Corjova, where he spent some fifty years of his life. Before the October Revolution, he had amassed a relatively large agricultural estate and was employing farmhands, leading him to be designated as a kulak. Politically and socially marginalized by the MASSR, he sold most of his properties before the land collectivization of 1930. Sârbu was allowed to join the collective farm, and became one of its managers, but in 1933 lost his position and found himself arrested by the OGPU. He received a suspended sentence for theft (due to having purposefully destroyed some of his crops), was stripped of his remaining property, and then reduced to supporting his wife and eight children as a day laborer.

In 1935, the NKVD engineered Sârbu's forced resettlement to Pervomaisk, separating him from his children. He was arrested after his clandestine return to Corjova, in 1936, and sentenced to a prison term in Tiraspol; in 1937, he broke the terms of his parole and was rearrested, along with his wife Tatiana. They returned to Corjova in 1940, shortly before Romania occupied the region. Narrowly escaping execution by the NKVD, Sârbu welcomed the Romanian-established Transnistria Governorate, which appointed him mayor of Corjova. He fled to Romania in early 1944, leaving most of his family behind. Sârbu was briefly active in the anti-communist resistance movement in Romania; upon the consolidation of a communist regime, which he reportedly continued to resent, he withdrew back into peasant life, spending the rest of his life at Brezoaele. His descendants in modern-day Moldova include Vladimir Voronin, who became chairman of the Party of Communists and served terms as President of Moldova. Voronin's connections to Sârbu, first exposed publicly in the early 2000s, have remained a topic of controversy.

== Biography ==
=== Early life and wealth ===
Isidor Sârbu, described in some sources as a "full-blooded Romanian" or "great Romanian", was born in the village of Corjova, then part of the Russian Kherson Governorate—and on the Dniester-marked border with Bessarabia Governorate. His officially recorded year of birth is 1887, though he himself believed that he was already aged fifty-seven in early 1942. According to records of his interrogation, he was from a peasant family that, at one point, comprised eleven individuals; he had five sisters and four brothers. He reportedly spent most of his youth working the land and only took Sundays off. A devout member of the Russian Orthodox Church, he kept to the old Moldavian rites, reading to himself from a psalter that had originated at Neamț Monastery, in the Kingdom of Romania.

Sârbu married and established his own farm in 1904, interrupting his agricultural life to perform his service in the Imperial Russian Army, at Chișinău (1905–1909); he was again called under arms during World War I, serving for its entire duration with the Romanian Front. By 1917, his farm stretched over 40 hectares, in addition to which he leased 10–15 hectares; he owned two houses, some ten cows, and 25 sheep, and employed three or four seasonal farmhands. He and his wife Tatiana Negrea had eight living children by 1933; the oldest was a daughter, Olga, born in 1915 or 1916. Shortly after the war, Bessarabia united with Romania, leaving Corjova and the Sârbus in lands disputed between the Ukrainian People's Republic and the communist Odessa Soviet Republic. Isidor once described his first experiences with Bolshevism, in 1917, as a time when "all things came tumbling down."

In 1919, Corjova fell to the Ukrainian SSR, and in 1922 became a frontier village of the Soviet Union; the MASSR was organized on that border territory in 1924. Little is recorded of Sârbu's life during the October Revolution and the Ukrainian Civil War, down to the New Economic Policy of the late 1920s. Branded a kulak by the MASSR government, he had no voting rights in Soviet elections, down to 1928, when he was enfranchised as a serednyak (middle-income peasant). He had by then sold or distributed his property—holding on to just eight hectares of farmland and twelve sheep—, but was regarded as a speculator, and continued to pay a large share of his income in punitive taxes. This period was followed by the collectivization of 1930. During the latter event Sârbu was recorded by MASSR officials as almost a kulak, but opted to enter Corjova's collective farm, possibly for fear of deportation to Siberia. He managed to earn the respect of his peers, being selected as one of the farm's administrators.

=== Soviet repression ===
Despite his efforts at integration, Sârbu was targeted by the dekulakization campaign of 1932. Initially prosecuted for theft of collective property in August 1932 (he and one of his sons, Marcu, allegedly burned down some of the crops), he was excluded from the collective farm in February 1933; in April, the OGPU arrested Isidor and Tatiana Sârbu. A tribunal found the evidence against Isidor inconclusive, and he received a suspended sentence.

Sârbu himself reported that the OGPU had confiscated and sold his house in March 1933, leaving the family to bunk into a room in Corjova, rented to them by Dumitru Halippa. This situation lasted to 1934, when the Sârbus moved to the neighboring city, Dubăsari, where Isidor worked two jobs—as a vintager and as a brickmaker. The NKVD's Ivan Sterpul intervened in April 1935, ordering that Isidor and his brother Simion (who had returned from a Gulag), along with three other men, be resettled away from the Romanian border. Isidor and Tatiana moved inland to Pervomaisk, leaving their children in the care of relatives from the Dubăsari area; upon arrival, Sârbu was rewarded with his first Soviet passport. Unable to provide for his family, he ignored NKVD orders and returned to Corjova that June, bunking with his brother-in-law Serghei Șpac. The Militsiya withdrew his passport, warning him that he should return to Pervomaisk. Sârbu continued to defy the authorities, and was again arrested in January 1936.

On January 14, 1936, the NKVD commandants of the MASSR sentenced Sârbu to three years in a penal facility at Tiraspol; a model prisoner who took up manual labor on the surrounding farmland, he was paroled on April 29—only his interdiction to live in Romanian border was still upheld, for another three years. He returned to Corjova, but was ordered by the NKVD to leave it within 24 hours. Left without any other options, Sârbu moved into the South Caucasus, as a day laborer. He fell ill and was again forced by his circumstances to ignore the terms of his release, returning to Corjova in 1937. Arrested by the Militsiya on October 26, 1937, he was released, but he and his entire family were ordered to vacate the area within two weeks. Failing to comply with this order, Isidor and his wife were arrested together on January 26, 1938. They were ordered to serve terms at the NKVD-run facility in Kherson; Tatiana was sentenced to a one-year term, while Isidor had to serve his remaining two years. Their teen-aged daughter, Olga, was shocked by these news, which, as Sârbu himself noted, contributed to her death in May 1938.

=== World War II and Romanian life ===
Tatiana returned to Corjova in 1939, hiding out in the fields; Isidor came for her in late January 1940. He was received by the village soviet, whose mayor agreed to employ him on the local vineyards, allowing the Sârbus some legal recognition. This period was only months ahead of the Soviet incursion into Bessarabia, which brought Corjova and Dubăsari into the new Moldavian Soviet Socialist Republic. The following year saw the disestablishment of Soviet rule, with Operation Barbarossa and Operation München, in which Nazi Germany and Romania coordinated to invade. Sârbu refused Soviet orders to evacuate the MASSR, and instructed other villagers to stay put, since "Romanians are coming over to deliver us from those heathens." During the Soviet withdrawal, he narrowly avoided being apprehended and executed by the NKVD: though his name was on the kill-list, he hid with his father-in-law, Toader Negrea. One of his sons had instead been drafted into the Red Army, and as such processed by Romania as a prisoner-of-war.

Corjova was eventually taken by the Wehrmacht, rather than by the Romanian Army, less than a week into the invasion. Sârbu and his daughters personally greeted the Germans, offering them bread and salt. Romania was handed control of both Bessarabia and the former MASSR, establishing the latter as a semi-autonomous Transnistria Governorate. In January 1942, Sârbu tried to visit his prisoner son at an internment camp in rural Romania, but only reached Bucharest, where he was stranded by blizzards. While there, he bunked with the philologist and political journalist Diomid Strungaru, to whom he recounted his past and present troubles; as Strungaru reports, his guest had vivid nightmares of being tortured by the NKVD.

In 1941–1942, one of Sârbu's nephews was the mayor of Corjova, in which capacity he redistributed land into individual plots. Sârbu himself was eventually appointed to the mayoral office, and gave an interview about his life for a Romanian magazine (April 1943). The latter event again took him to Bucharest. Sârbu's newfound status lasted only until the Soviet reoccupation of 1944. Ahead of this defeat, he and his daughter Domnica took refuge in Romania; Tatiana and the couple's other children opted to stay in Corjova. As noted by historian Ion Varta, he petitioned the Romanian authorities not to extradite him, "allow[ing] him to live in Romania". Except for an enrollment with the anti-communist resistance in the Oaș Mountains, Isidor lived the rest of his life in Dâmbovița County, at Brezoaele. According to oral tradition, he tried to warn locals about the emergence of a Romanian communist regime and the introduction of collectivization to Romania. He died in 1980, and is buried in Brezoaele.

== Legacy ==
Isidor Sârbu was survived by Domnica, who kept sporadic contacts with her Soviet cousins, visiting them several times after 1976. That side of the family had since achieved fame through Isidor's grandson Vladimir Voronin (born to Pelaghia). He began his political career with the Communist Party of Moldavia in the 1960s, when he reportedly abjured the Sârbus; according to Ion Costaș, of the Democratic Forum of Romanians in Moldova, it still remains unexplained "how someone with this biographical record could be promoted within the Soviet Union". His ascent continued in post-Soviet Moldova, when he became leader of the Party of Communists, serving as national president in 2001–2009. The story first broke in March 2002, when Gheorghe Budeanu published in Timpul an article asking that Voronin either confirm or deny his connection with Brezoaele.

The aged Domnica participated in the resulting debates. In 2002, she came out as a supporter of Moldovan–Romanian unionism and believer in a fused ethnic identity; she also argued that her father's native region, which had become a Soviet-style secessionist entity, was unsalvagable by Moldova, and should be "left to sink or swim". In tandem, she criticized Voronin for not sharing this agenda, and more generally for ignoring her. Dying in 2004, she shares her father's grave.

Voronin's successor as president, Mihai Ghimpu, ordered the dossiers of Soviet political prisoners to be declassified in 2010, which allowed public access to Sârbu's biographical records. In 2012, Voronin himself discussed his family history with journalist Lorena Bogza of ProTV Chișinău. He "admitted to being Isidor Sârbu's grandson, but denied that the latter had been an anti-communist, or that he had taken refuge to Romania of his own will. [Voronin] claimed that his grandfather wished to make his return to Corjova in 1945, but that he had been labeled a traitor by the Soviets, and only in that context did he prefer to stay in Romania." More in detail, Voronin argued that Sârbu had been sent to Romania with crates of ordnance, and denied that the family had ever been wealthy, other than owning a cart and horses. He also recounted having once met Domnica. Voronin left open the issue of his ethnic background, prompting journalists to argue that his ancestry may be entirely Romanian.
