= Sergiu Andon =

Romanian politician (born 1939)

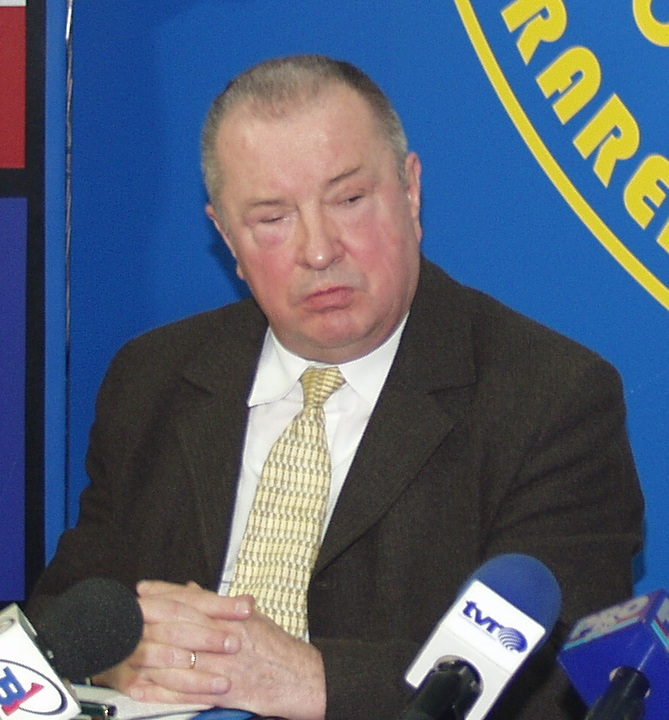

Personal details
- Born: September 12, 1939 (age 86) Bucharest, Kingdom of Romania
- Party: Conservative Party
- Education: University of Bucharest

Sergiu Andon (born 12 September 1939) is a Romanian politician and a member of the Conservative Party.

== Career ==
Born in Bucharest, he graduated in 1961 from the Faculty of Law of the University of Bucharest. Between 1961 and 1968 he worked as a prosecutor in Fetești, Slobozia, and Urziceni. Between 1968 and 1972, he was the main redactor of the Flacăra magazine and between 1972 and 1989 he was working as a publicist commentator for the magazine. 1989 to 1994 he was the redactor-chief deputy of the Adevărul newspaper.

He wrote some of the most notables articles about King Michael I ("Damn it, Majesty!"). In 1995, he became a politician and worked as a general secretary until 1996. His attitude towards the monarchy changed, ending up congratulating Michael's speech in Parliament on 2011. 1994 and 1996 he was director of the Romedia agency. From 1996 on he worked as a lawyer in Bucharest.

Between 1997 and 2000, he worked as vice president of PUR, and in 2000 he became the leader of the legislative department PC.

In May 2012, the National Integrity Agency (ANI) determined that Andon's job was incompatible with his function as a deputy in the Parliament and requested his revoke from the function, according to the civil sentence No. 2930/13.04.2011. The High Court of Cassation and Justice confirmed his claims and gave a definite verdict of incompatibility. The first time ever the Parliament ignored the decision of the ICCJ (HCoJ) and refused to put it for Andon's revocation. He was revoked from function on 11 September 2012.

Andon is a member of UNICEF and of the Union of the Democratic Jurists in Romania.
