= Dinu Patriciu =

Romanian billionaire businessman and politician (1950–2014)

- Born: Dan Costache Patriciu; 3 August 1950; Bucharest, People's Republic of Romania
- Died: 19 August 2014 (aged 64); London, United Kingdom
- Resting place: Bellu Cemetery, Bucharest
- Education: Bucharest Institute of Architecture
- Occupations: Businessman; politician; architect
- Political party: National Liberal Party (PNL)

Dan Costache (Dinu) Patriciu (Romanian pronunciation: [ˈdinu paˈtrit͡ʃu]; 3 August 1950 – 19 August 2014) was a Romanian billionaire businessman and politician. At the time of his death, Patriciu was the richest man in Romania. His wealth was based on the Rompetrol company (the second largest oil company in Romania), which he took over from the Romanian state and later sold to Kazakhstan's state-owned KazMunayGas.

Patriciu's business activity was marred by legal troubles, being charged with defrauding the state, money laundering and illegally manipulating markets, but he successfully withstood the investigations into allegedly corrupt privatization deals.

A supporter of right-libertarian politics, Patriciu was a long-time member of the National Liberal Party (PNL). During the 2009 Romanian presidential election, Patriciu released a video in which President Băsescu appeared to hit a boy; Traian Băsescu sued for libel and won.

== Early life ==
Patriciu was born in Bucharest in 1950, the son of Valeriu Patriciu, a mining engineer and chief geologist for Astra Română oil company during the interwar period. He graduated the Bucharest Institute of Architecture in 1975 and worked as an architect. Starting in 1978 he taught at the Institute of Architecture. He won several architecture awards and he was involved in building projects in Romania and in the United Arab Emirates, including a palace in Abu Dhabi.

== Political activity ==
A founding member of the National Liberal Party in 1990, Patriciu was elected a member of the Chamber of Deputies in the 1990 Romanian general election on the lists for the Timiș County. In 1991, he was named the Minister for Public Works and Territorial Planning.

He was part of the Partidul Liberal '93 (PL '93) which split from PNL. He was re-elected a member of the parliament on the list of Democratic Convention of Romania (of which PL '93 was a member) in Dâmbovița County. Patriciu was the leader of the parliamentary group of PL '93 and Partidul Alianța Civică.

Patriciu was an unsuccessful candidate for Mayor of Bucharest in the 1996 Romanian local election.

In 2000, he was elected on the lists of PNL for the Prahova County. He resigned on June 18, 2003 due to incompatibility between public office and his private business interests.

== Business activity ==
=== Real estate ===
In 1990, he founded the first private company in Romania, "Alpha", having architecture and constructions activities. The following year, Patriciu's company began buying land in a northern district of Bucharest to build an apartment complex. A couple of octogenarians initially refused to sell, before reaching an agreement. Short time after this, the old man died and his wife disappeared, police being informed of this disappearance by a business associate of Patriciu. Not long after, the house was demolished and the land was taken over. Accused by the press of involvement in a murder, Patriciu denied any involvement and claimed that her death delayed the project.

In 2007, he bought the Fabian Romania Property Fund, a British real estate investment fund in Romania. As of 2012, his Dinu Patriciu Global Properties company owned real estate (office and commercial buildings) worth an estimated $1 billion in Germany and Romania, as well as 25 residential projects in the United Arab Emirates. He previously, in 2011, liquidated his worth €110 million portfolio of Swedish property, as well as some properties in Paris and Hague.

=== Rompetrol ===
In 1998, he bought from the Romanian government the oil company Rompetrol. A year later, the company took over the Vega Ploiești oil refinery. In the same year, the headquarters of the company was moved to the Netherlands. In 2000, Rompetrol took over Petros, Romania's only oil well services company at the time, renaming it Rompetrol Well Services. In 2001, Petromidia Năvodari, the largest refinery in Romania was sold to Rompetrol for $50 million.

The €570 million debt of Rompetrol to the Romanian state was converted in 2003 into bonds by the Adrian Năstase Government. In 2014, the Victor Ponta government erased the debt.

Dinu Patriciu sold 75% of the shares in Rompetrol to Kazakhstan's KazMunayGas for $2.7 billion in 2007, becoming the richest Romanian.

=== Other companies ===
Patriciu bought the Adevărul newspaper in 2006 and increased the holding's portfolio to include the Click! tabloid, the local edition of Forbes, OK! and Foreign Policy, as well as cultural magazine Dilema Veche, women's magazine Tango and science popularization magazine, Știință și Tehnică. In 2012, he sold Adevărul Holding to Cristian Burci.

Together with former Georgian prime minister Lado Gurgenidze, Patriciu bought the Liberty Bank (formerly "People's Bank").

Patriciu attempted to build a convenience store chain named mic.ro, however it quickly ended in bankruptcy, with over 45 million € debts to banks in addition to large debts to suppliers. According to Coface Romania, the development was done using credit from suppliers and banks, with almost no funding from the investors.

== Criminal investigation ==
In May 2006, following an interrogation, Dinu Patriciu was arrested for 24 hours, being accused of tax evasion, money laundering and fraud. He was freed at the end of the 24 hours, as the judges refused to extend the warrant requested by the prosecutors. Patriciu accused the prosecutors of "serving a reactionary interest group represented by General Ioan Talpeș and former president Ion Iliescu". The Prosecutors' Body issued a communiqué in which they decried "a gross interference of political parties in the case", arguing that "the fight against corruption must be carried to the end".

The Directorate for the Investigation of Organised Crime and Terrorism (DIICOT) sent the case to court, alleging seven felonies: embezzlement, money laundering, conspiracy, market manipulation, disclosure of privileged information and initiation or establishment of an organised crime ring. Patriciu was accused of being involved, as CEO of Rompetrol, in a case of embezzlement in 1999–2001. The company misappropriated an amount of $85 million owed to the state budget under EPSA agreements.

In 2007, President Traian Băsescu accused the then-Prime Minister Călin Popescu-Tăriceanu of sending him a note in 2005 asking to influence the political investigations of Dinu Patriciu, an ally of Popescu-Tăriceanu. Băsescu said that he did not make the note public earlier because he wanted to avoid derailing the negotiations for EU admission. The Prime Minister admitted he sent the note, but claimed he just wanted the President to make sure that investigations were carried out correctly.

Patriciu and the other defendants were acquitted in 2012 during the first trial, in a verdict that was later overturned following an appeal of the prosecutors. The Court of Appeals sentenced in 2014 several of his associates to prison, including PNL Senator Sorin Roșca Stănescu and Alexandru Bucșa, a former vice-president of Rompetrol Netherlands.

While the criminal case against Patriciu was ended due to his death, the civil case continues.

== Illness and death ==
Patriciu was diagnosed with cirrhosis and he underwent a liver transplant in Milan in 2012. He was later diagnosed with lymphoma.

Patriciu died on 19 August 2014, aged 64, at the Royal Free Hospital in London due to a lung infection after spending several days in hospital. He was buried in the Bucharest Bellu Cemetery, in a private ceremony.
