= Adevărul Moldova =

Moldovan newspaper based in Chișinău

Adevărul
- Type: Daily
- Format: Compact
- Owner: Adevărul Holding
- Publisher: Adrian Halpert
- Editor: Laurenţiu Ciocăzanu
- Founded: 2010
- Headquarters: House of the Free Press; Piaţa Presei Libere, Nr. 1, Sector 1, Bucharest
- ISSN: 1016-7587
- Website: adevarul.md

Adevărul (Romanian pronunciation: [adeˈvərul]; meaning "The Truth") is a Moldovan daily newspaper, based in Chișinău founded in December 2010. Valentina Basiul served as its deputy editor between 2010 and 2014.
