= Cristian Tudor Popescu =

Romanian journalist and essayist (born 1956)

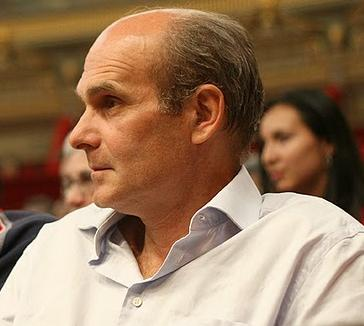
- Popescu in 2009
- Born: 1 October 1956 (age 70); Bucharest, Romania
- Education: Politehnica University of Bucharest
- Occupation: Journalist

Cristian Tudor Popescu (Romanian pronunciation: [kristiˈan ˈtudor poˈpesku]; also known as CTP; born 1 October 1956) is a Romanian journalist, essayist, engineer, short-story writer and political commentator. Author of science fiction stories during his youth, he also hosted talk shows for various television stations, and had contributions as a literary critic and translator.

Popescu was the editor-in-chief of Adevărul, and, in 2005, he founded the newspaper Gândul in association with Mircea Dinescu. He was also the president of the Romanian Press Club until November 2006, when he resigned his office over an issue regarding the representation of journalists in the Club. He was re-elected president in February 2007. Based on opinion polls, he was designated Romania's best journalist four years in a row 2005–2008.

== Biography ==
A native of Bucharest, he graduated the Mihai Viteazul High School in 1975 and Politehnica University in 1981, majoring in automation engineering. Popescu began writing fiction during the communist regime, focusing on his journalistic career after the Romanian Revolution of 1989. His first publication was 1984 in the Echinox literary magazine of Cluj-Napoca with the SF story Grădina de cenușă ("The Ash Garden"). Popescu's work was subsequently featured in most SF anthologies, almanacs and magazines before 1990, and he was twice a laureate of the ROMCON Awards (1985, 1986). He received the Eurocon Award for the collection of short stories Planetarium.

After 1990, he confined his SF activity to translating and editing the works of others. Popescu translated Stanisław Lem's novels Manuscript Found in a Bathtub, Return from the Stars, as well as Norman Spinrad's Bug Jack Barron (in collaboration with Dan Mihai Pavelescu). As an editor of SF literature, he published Dănuț Ungureanu's novel Marilyn Monroe on a Closed Curve (1993), Dan Merișca's Revolt in Labyrinth (1996), and the SF anthology The Empire of the Crooked Mirrors (1993).

Between 1990 and 2005, Popescu was the editor-in-chief of Adevărul newspaper. In disagreement with the management, he and 81 journalists resigned from the paper and, together with Mircea Dinescu, started their own publication, Gândul, however Mircea Dinescu resigned in January 2008. Together with Emil Hurezeanu he was also a co-host of the TV two-man political talk show Cap și Pajură (Heads and Tails) broadcast on Realitatea TV.

Popescu is a film analyst, with a Ph.D. in cinematography from the Caragiale National University of Theatre and Film in Bucharest, where he has been teaching a course on Manipulation and Propaganda Techniques in Movie and Television. In May 2009, Cristian Tudor Popescu was awarded the title of Bologna Professor, having been elected by the students of Caragiale National University of Theatre and Film, Bucharest. Since 2006, Popescu is the host of the TV show CineTePrinde, broadcast each Saturday, starting from 10 PM, on Pro Cinema, where he comments a movie, which is given afterwards, from a critical point of view. He is member of UCIN and Writers' Union of Romania. He was until 2022 a political commentator at the Romanian private TV station Digi 24.

A fact that has become widely known in the last years is that CTP is an accomplished tennis player having won numerous national tournaments in the 55+ senior category competing against as many as 140 contestants at an event. Beside playing tennis, he is a public tennis commentator for various Romanian private TV stations including, most notably, Digi Sport.

In May 2025, Popescu criticised the decision of the Constitutional Court of Romania (CCR) to restrict public access to asset and interest declarations – including information about spouses' property and income – describing it as a threat to national security and anti-corruption agenda of Nicușor Dan's presidency.

== Published volumes ==
- 1987 – Planetarium, Albatros, Bucharest, 1987 – The Prize of the European Congress of Science-Fiction, Montpellier, France
- 1991 – The Time of the Empty Colt, Cartea Românească; 1998, second edition, Polirom
- 1993 – The Empire of Crooked Mirrors, Adevarul Society, anthology of science-fiction literature
- 1997 – The Children of the Beast (DU Style); 1998, second edition, Polirom
- 1998 – Dead Time, Polirom
- 2000 – Omohom-Speculative Fictions, Polirom
- 2000 – Romania, transfer picture, Polirom
- 2001 – A Corpse Filled Up with Newspapers, Polirom
- 2004 – The Romanian Nobel, Polirom
- 2004 – Mind's Sport, Polirom
- 2004 – The Freedom of Hatred, Polirom
- 2005 – The Shakespeare Trigram- Speculative Fictions
- 2005 – Orgasmus comunistas
- 2007 – The Luxury of Death, Polirom
- 2009 – Scattered Words, Polirom
- 2011 – The Deaf Movie in a Silent Romania. Politics and Propaganda in the Romanian Fiction Movie (1912–1989), Polirom
- 2013 – Filmar, Polirom
- 2016 – Viața și Opera (Life and Oeuvre), Polirom
- 2019 - Vremea Mînzului Sec, Polirom
- 2022 - Dumnezeu nu e mort, Polirom
- 2024 - Râsul dracului, Polirom
