= Timpul de dimineață =

Moldovan newspaper

Timpul de Dimineață
- Type: Daily newspaper
- Founder: Constantin Tănase
- Editor-in-chief: Sorina Ștefârță
- Editor: Constantin Tănase
- Staff writers: Arcadie Gherasim
- Language: Romanian
- Headquarters: Chişinău
- Circulation: 32,000
- Website: Official website

Timpul de dimineață (Romanian for "The Morning Times") or, in short, Timpul ("The Time"), is a Moldovan newspaper founded in 2001 by Constantin Tănase.

== Overview ==
The director of Timpul de dimineață is Constantin Tănase. Launched as a weekly on September 21, 2001, Timpul became a daily in October 2005 (the only daily Romanian newspaper). As of March 2009, Timpul changed their logo and their website. It targets a Romanian speaking readership in Romania and the Republic of Moldova, as well as the expatriates of the Moldovan diaspora. Timpul is a noted proponent of liberal, anticommunist and independent political views.

During the 2007 local election, Timpul de dimineață disfavored, directly or indirectly, the Party of Communists of the Republic of Moldova and the Christian Democratic People's Party. The newspaper is close to the Liberal Party of Moldova and Mihai Ghimpu.

== Notable people ==
- Constantin Tănase
- Sorina Ştefârţă
- Valentina Basiul
- Alexandru Vakulovski
- Pavel Păduraru (novelist)
- Vasile Ernu (novelist)
- Constantin Cheianu (novelist)
- George Damian
