= Sorina Ștefîrță =

Press Secretary and Public Communication Advisor to the President
- In office 11 January 2021 – 10 January 2023
- President: Maia Sandu
- Succeeded by: Irina Gotișan-Sotnic

Sorina Ștefîrță (born 10 December 1973) is a journalist from the Republic of Moldova. She is the editor-in-chief of Timpul de dimineață, a major Moldovan newspaper.
