= Click! =

Romanian Tabloid

- Front page of Click! (June 21, 2011), with the headline story reporting on a hospital incident that occurred to Horia Brenciu
- Type: Daily newspaper
- Format: Tabloid
- Owner: Adevărul Holding
- Editor-in-chief: Cristian Stancu
- Photo editor: Florin Șuler
- Founded: May 2005; 20 years ago (as Averea) March 9, 2007; 18 years ago (as Click!)
- Language: Romanian
- Headquarters: 21 Fabrica de Glucoză Street, Sector 2, Bucharest 077190
- Country: Romania
- ISSN: 1842-9165
- OCLC number: 896859668
- Website: www.click.ro

Click! (former Averea) is a Romanian tabloid newspaper owned by Adevărul Holding media company. In 2009, Click! had the top sales in Romania, with 208,903 sold on issue.
