= Mihail Tașcă =

Moldovan historian and jurist

Mihai Taşcă

Secretary of the Commission for the Study of the Communist Dictatorship in Moldova
- Incumbent
- Assumed office January 14, 2010

Personal details
- Education: Moldova State University
- Profession: Jurist

Mihai Taşcă is a historian and jurist from the Republic of Moldova.

== Biography ==
Mihai Taşcă is a Doctor of Law, senior researcher, Institute of History, State and Law of the Academy of Sciences of Moldova. Mihai Taşcă is the secretary of the Commission for the Study of the Communist Dictatorship in Moldova.

In 2006–2008, Taşcă won two cases concerning the denial of access to information opened against the Information and Security Service of the Republic of Moldova, which denied access to its archive.

On March 18, 2008, Mihai Taşcă submitted an application to the Ministry of Justice, seeking access to the files of the political parties; he intended to carry out a study about the election campaigns. On April 15, the Ministry rejected the application. After the second refusal, the researcher sued the Ministry to the Court of Appeal on June 17. On September 30, 2008, the court ordered that the Ministry of Justice offers Taşcă the files he asked for.

In 2001, he founded Revista de drept privat; now he is the editor in chief of this scientific magazine. He is also writing for daily Adevarul-Moldova, in a rubric called The Archives of Communism (once in two weeks, the other two materials per month being authored by historian Igor Caşu).

== Works ==
- Mihail Taşcă, Sfatul Țării şi actualele autorităţi locale, "Timpul de dimineaţă", no. 114 (849), June 27, 2008 (page 16)
