= Dilema veche =

- Editor: Mircea Vasilescu
- Categories: Culture
- Frequency: Weekly
- Circulation: 31,000
- Founder: Andrei Pleşu
- Founded: 2004; 21 years ago
- Country: Romania
- Language: Romanian
- Website: dilemaveche.ro

Dilema veche (English: "Old Dilemma") is a Romanian weekly magazine that covers culture, social topics, and politics. It was founded in 2004 as the successor to the magazine Dilema, which was founded in 1993. Both magazines were founded by Andrei Pleșu. The magazine is currently part of Adevărul Holding, and is a member of the Eurozine network. It has a circulation of 31,000.

== History ==
=== Precursor Dilema (1993–2003) ===
In 1993, the magazine Dilema was founded by the former first post-communist Romanian Minister of Culture Andrei Pleșu. It was edited by the Romanian Cultural Foundation, an independent culture body.

=== Dilema veche (2004–present) ===
On 1 January 2004, that foundation became the Romanian Cultural Institute, and placed under the patronage of the Romanian Presidency and Government. However, the Dilema editorial staff became concerned that these new circumstances could have a negative impact on the magazine's independence and its public perception. Eventually, editor-in-chief Mircea Vasilescu requested that the editorial staff be allowed to launch a new magazine under the name Dilema. That request was rejected, so the new magazine was founded by Andrei Pleşu under the name Dilema Veche. Initially, it was founded with the financial support of some of its columnists and of the poet and publicist Mircea Dinescu.

The magazines Dilema and Dilema veche are often regarded as one magazine, with Dilema veche being the continuation of Dilema. In 2006, Dilema veche became part of Adevărul Holding, a major Romanian press trust owned by businessman Dinu Patriciu.

== See also ==
- List of magazines in Romania
