= Brezoaia =

Brezoaia Брезоая (Russian) Брезоая (Ukrainian)
- Village
- Location within Moldova
- Coordinates: 46°31′15″N 29°27′14″E
- Country: Moldova

Government
  - Mayor: Veaceslav Snegur (PCRM)

Area
  - Total: 35.81 km^{2} (13.83 sq mi)
- Elevation: 120 m (390 ft)

Population (2014 census)
  - Total: 873
- Time zone: UTC+2 (EET)
  - Summer (DST): UTC+3 (EEST)
- Postal code: MD-4213

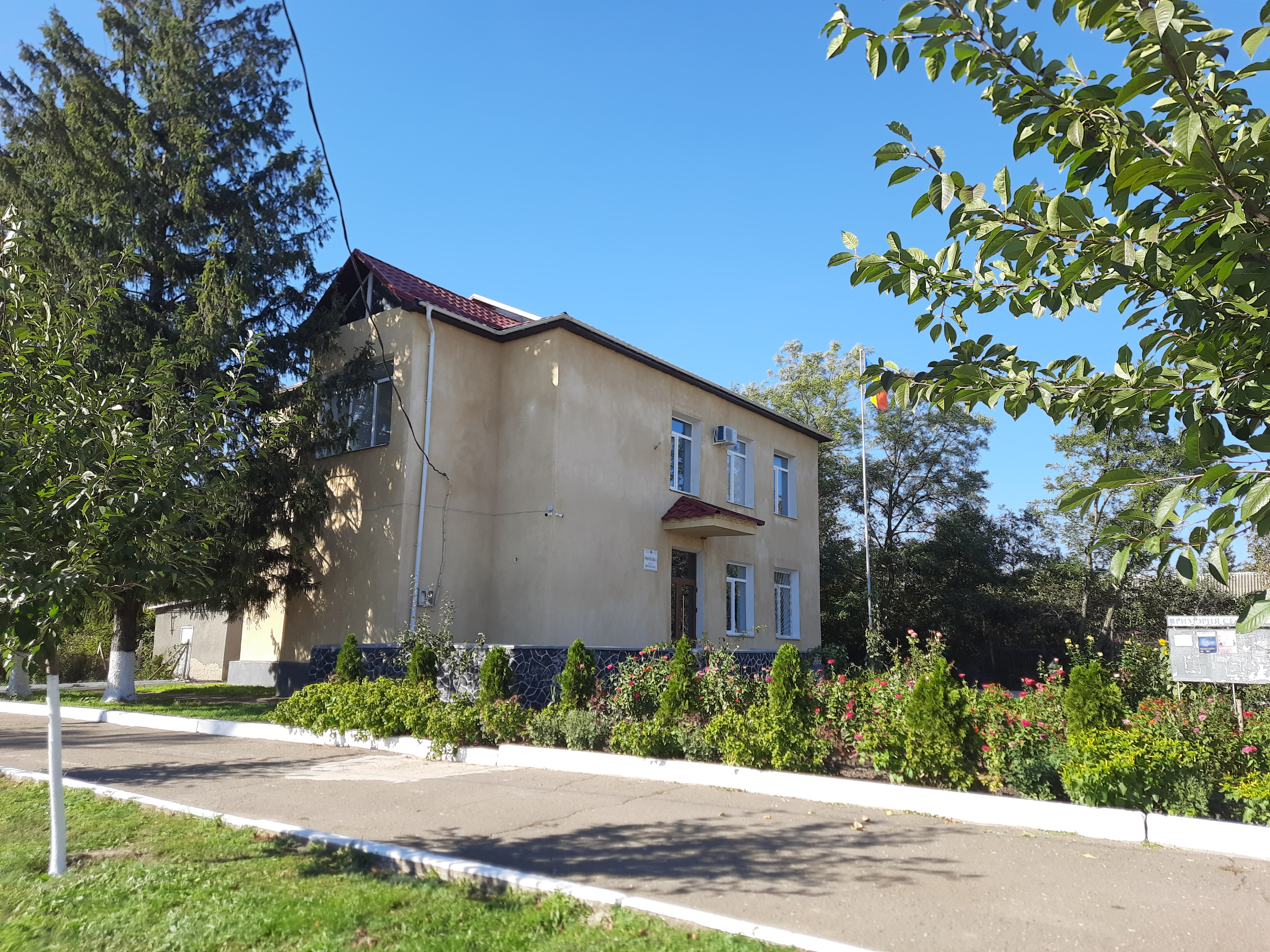

Brezoaia is a village in Ștefan Vodă District, Moldova.

== Population ==
According to the 2004 Moldovan census, the village of Brezoaia had a population of 1,035, comprising 513 men and 522 women.
