= Under arms =

State of military readiness

Under arms describes a state of military readiness (actual or ceremonial). Typically, troops are considered "under arms" when they are in uniform, on duty, and carrying a weapon (rifle, side-arm, or sword), as opposed to being in uniform, on duty, but not carrying a weapon.

Soldiers not actually carrying a weapon but wearing a service belt or web gear associated with carrying weapons may be considered to be symbolically "under arms".

Soldiers normally remove headgear while indoors; however, soldiers who are under arms normally wear their headgear indoors, with a few exceptions.
