= Brezoaele =

- Commune
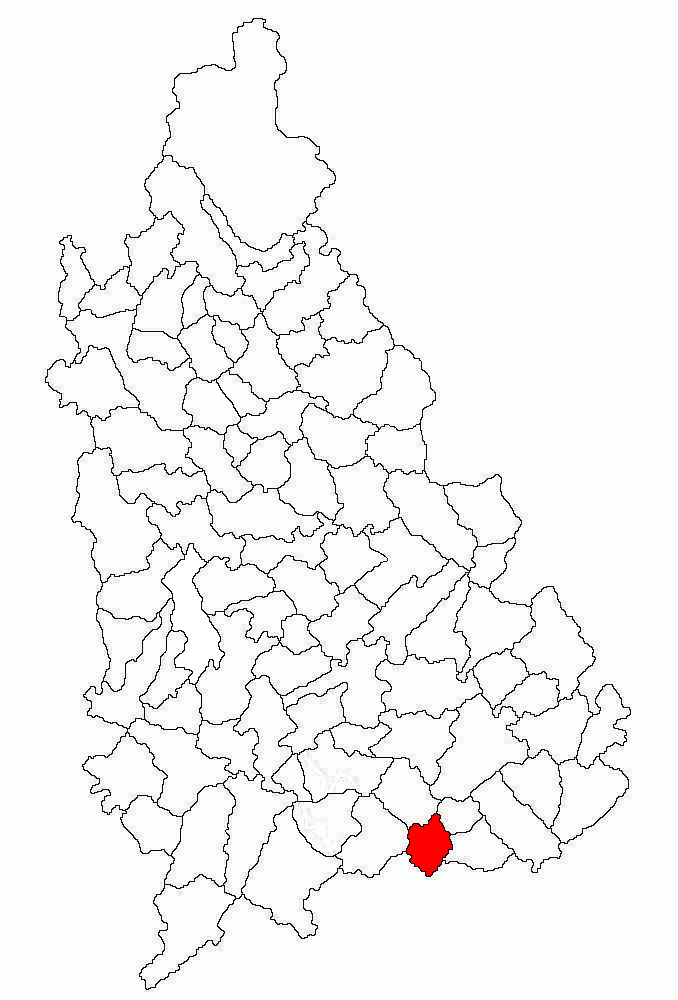
- Location in Dâmbovița County

- Location in Romania
- Coordinates: 44°33′49″N 25°46′24″E
- Country: Romania
- County: Dâmbovița

Government
  - Mayor (2024–2028): Ion Florea (PSD)
- Elevation: 124 m (407 ft)
- Population (2021-12-01): 3,690
- Time zone: EET/EEST (UTC+2/+3)
- Postal code: 137060
- Area code: +(40) 245
- Vehicle reg.: DB
- Website: primariabrezoaele.ro

Brezoaele is a commune in Dâmbovița County, Muntenia, Romania. It is composed of two villages, Brezoaele and Brezoaia.

There are two primary schools and three kindergartens in Brezoaele.

Historical population
Year	Pop.	±%
2002	4,146	—
2011	4,012	−3.2%
2021	3,690	−8.0%
Source: Census data
