= Gândul =

Romanian online newspaper

- Format: Online newspaper
- Editor: Gândul Media Network SRL
- Founded: 2005
- Ceased publication: April 8, 2011; 14 years ago
- Language: Romanian
- City: Bucharest
- Country: Romania
- ISSN: 1841-2726
- Website: https://www.gandul.ro/

Gândul (Romanian pronunciation: [ˈɡɨndul], "The Thought") is a Romanian online newspaper published in Bucharest. It was founded in May 2005 by Mircea Dinescu, who used to write a daily editorial called "Vorba lu' Dinescu", and Cristian Tudor Popescu, who was also the editor-in-chief until January 2008. Its initial circulation was about 52,000. In 2006, Publimedia acquired Gândul and subsequently changed the format, nameplate and design.

Gândul ceased print publication on 8 April 2011.

Gândul Media Network bought Gândul from Adrian Sârbu, the owner of Mediafax Group, in 2019.

== See also ==
- Hamangia culture, which produced The Thinker figurine similar to the one used in the newspaper's logo
