= Mass media in Romania =

The mass media in Romania refers to mass media outlets based in Romania. Television, magazines, and newspapers are all operated by both state-owned and for-profit corporations which depend on advertising, subscription, and other sales-related revenues. The Constitution of Romania guarantees freedom of speech. As a country in transition, the Romanian media system is under transformation.

Reporters Without Borders ranks Romania 42nd in its Worldwide Press Freedom Index, from 2013. Freedom House ranked it as "partly free" in 2014.

== History ==
Romania's newspaper market thrived after the 1989 revolution, but many newspapers subsequently closed because of rising costs. Most households in Bucharest have cable TV. There are hundreds of cable distributors offering access to Romanian, European and other stations.

According to europaworld.com, in 2004 there were:

- radio users: 5,369,000
- television users: 5,822,000
- telephones (main lines in use): 4,390,800 (2005)
- mobile cellular phones (subscribers): 22,000,000 (2008)
- personal computers: 2,450,000
- internet users: 4,500,000
- book production (inclusively pamphlets): 13,288,000 titles and 9,288,000 copies
- daily newspapers: 84
- other periodicals: 2,036

== Legislative framework ==
The 2003 Constitution of Romania upholds freedom of expression and prohibits censorship. The Constitution states that "Freedom of the press also involves the free setting up of publications," and that "No publication shall be suppressed, establishes free access to information and the autonomy of the public radio and TV.

No specific Press Law is in force in Romania. Hate speech is forbidden when it insults state symbols or religion, and when it promotes fascist or racist ideologies. Small fines are imposed: in 2014, the president Traian Basescu was fined for an anti-Roma comment, and a Facebook user was also fined after he had posted a Nazi slogan that was then quoted by a local newspaper.

In 2007 the media rights body Reporters Without Borders praised reforms to the criminal code; journalists can no longer be jailed on defamation charges. Defamation was decriminalised in 2010 by a Supreme Court ruling, but this was later overturned by a 2013 Constitutional Court decision. Civil defamation lawsuits often target journalists.

Freedom of access to information is guaranteed by the Constitution and by a specific law (Law on Free Access to Information of Public Interest, adopted in 2001). Public bodies are required to release information to the public, and journalists are afforded special privileges to obtain them faster. Yet, cases of officials obstructing access to information have been reported.

On 25 June 2008 the Senate adopted a draft amendment that would have obliged television and radio broadcasters to have a 50% of "good" or "positive" news. The Constitutional Court, however, ruled the bill unconstitutional before promulgation, so it never became law.

=== Status and self-regulation of journalists ===
Journalists have opposed initiatives for a Law on the Press, fearing that it would impose restrictions rather than granting freedoms. A 2009 study by CIJ, ActiveWatch and IMAS (The Institute for Marketing and Polls) reports that most journalists say that professional norms are not respected, mostly due to political and business pressures.

The Romanian Press Club has an Ethics Code and a Council of Honour to inquire journalists and media outlets found in breach of professional norms – although its decisions have often been criticised as arbitrary. The Convention of Media Organisations (COM) also adopted a deontological code; COM-member organisations have developed self-regulation guidelines for an increased accountability in the Romanian media. A "Unique Code" was issued in October 2009 by COM, MediaSind trade union and the Association of Journalists in Romania, to be adopted for the whole profession.

Among the broadcast media, regulation is managed by the National Broadcasting Council (Consiliul National al Audiovizualului), issuing warnings and fines for non lack of fairness and accuracy, as well as forcing media to display public acknowledgements for promoting indecent language and behaviour.

Journalists in Romania have to deal with job insecurity due to low and delayed salaries, as well as commercial and political pressures from media owners and advertisers. Collective labour contracts for the mass media sector expired in early 2014. Reporters in Romania also often face verbal abuse, intimidation, and occasionally even physical aggressions.

== Media outlets ==
Romania has one of the most dynamic media markets in southeastern Europe. TV is the medium of choice for most Romanians. State-owned TVR and the private stations Pro TV and Antena 1 command the lion's share of viewing, however there is a large number of smaller, private stations, some of them part of local networks. The state broadcaster, TVR, operates a second national network, TVR 2, and a pan-European satellite channel. Pay TV channels have a smaller but significant audience.

The public television company Televiziunea Română and the public radio Societatea Română de Radiodifuziune cover all the country and have also international programs. The state also owns a public news agency ROMPRES. The private media is grouped in media companies such as Intact Media Group, Media Pro, Realitatea-Caţavencu, Ringier, SBS Broadcasting Group, Centrul Național Media and other smaller independent companies. Cable television is widely available in almost all localities, and some have even adopted digital television. It offers besides the national channels a great number of international and specialized channels. FM stations cover most cities and most of them belong to national radio networks. Overall readership of most newspapers is slowly declining due to increasing competition from television and the Internet. Tabloids and sport newspapers are among the most read national newspapers. In every large city there is at least one local newspaper, which usually covers the rest of the county. An Audit Bureau of Circulations was established in 1998 and today represents a large number of publications.

The parliamentary majority controls appointments in the leadership of the public broadcaster Televiziunea Română, thus ensuring a constant pro-governmental bias. In the private sector, owners' interests in other economic sectors usually define the editorial line of the media.

- In July 2014, reporter Cristi Citre was fired from Digi TV (of the RCS-RDS media group) after he had harshly criticised PM Victor Ponta on his personal Facebook account.
- The state anticorruption prosecutor was repeatedly attacked in 2014 on the media controlled by the jailed political and media moghul Dan Voiculescu.
- TV and radio host Robert Turcescu admitted in September 2014 to having been an undercover agent, thus raising concerns about the penetration of the security services in the media sector of Romania.

The print sector has suffered heavily from the economic crisis, and the TV sector is also facing contraction. Few media are profitable, and they increasingly depend on advertising. The distribution of public advertising funds is politicised, and that of advertising funds from the European Union (the biggest advertisement buyer) has not been transparent in the wake of the 2014 Romanian presidential election. Ownership structure of Romanian media is often obfuscated through intermediaries. Foreign media have a presence in the country but have recently scaled it down

=== Print media ===
The Romanian print press market is rich and diversified. The National Institute of Statistics (NIS) counted up to 300 newspaper publishers in 2007, of which 159 dailies, and over 350 magazine publishers. 300 of them are audited by the Romanian Audit Bureau of Circulation (BRAT), hence gaining in credibility and advertising revenues.

The quality segment includes title such as Adevărul, Gândul (MediaPro), Evenimentul zilei (Ringier), România liberă (WAZ/Dan Adamescu), Jurnalul Național (Intact). Their circulation numbers remain low in relation to popular tabloids such as Click (Adevarul Holding), that in 2009 distributed 236,000 copies (more than all the quality press combined), Can Can or Libertatea (Ringier). Sport newspapers include Gazeta Sporturilor, owned by Intact, and ProSport, belonging to MediaPro. Business dailies include Ziarul Financiar, published by MediaPro, Business Standard (Realitatea-Catavencu) and Financiarul (Intact).

Local newspapers are usually not backed by big investors, and thus remain vulnerable to political and commercial pressures. The main ones include Gazeta de Sud in Craiova, Tribuna in Sibiu, Ziarul in Iași, Viața liberă in Galați and Transilvania Expres in Brasov. Readership has been in decline, among lacking professionalisation and poor distribution.

Magazines are a thriving segment. Some are spin-offs of popular newspapers, such as Libertatea or Click. Women's weeklies, TV guides and business weeklies (Business Magazin, Money Express, Saptamana financiara, Capital) also make good revenues. Glossy magazines and international franchises complete the scene. Academia Catavencu is a cult satirical weekly.

=== Radio broadcasting ===
The first private radio stations appeared in 1990; there are now more than 100 of them. State-run Radio Romania operates four national networks and regional and local stations. BBC World Service is available on 88 FM in the capital, and is relayed in Timișoara (93.9), Sibiu (88.4) and Constanta (96.9).

Private FM stations dominate the market in Romania, with more than 700 licenses from the National Broadcasting Council by 2009. Two networks achieved national coverage: Europa FM (owned by the French group Lagardere) and Info Pro (CME). The most popular private networks are Radio Zu (Intact), Radio 21 (Lagardere), ProFM (CME), Kiss FM (ProSiebenSat1), relying mostly on advertisement revenues, and broadcasting musical hits, entertainment, and short news bulletins.

The public company Radio România manages five national stations: Radio România Actualităţi (news), Radio România Cultural (culture and arts), Radio România Muzical (music), Radio Antena Satelor (farming and rural communities), and Radio 3Net – "Florian Pittiş" (a youth station broadcasting online). It also holds an international station (Radio Romania International) and a regional network of 12 stations (Radio România Regional), including Radio Iași and Radio Cluj. Radio România also includes the news agency Rador, a publishing house, a radio theatre production department, several orchestras and choirs.

=== Television broadcasting ===
Television is the most popular entertainment media in Romania, and it gathers two thirds of all advertising funds (337 million euro in 2008). The National Study of TV Audience has registered almost 50 TV stations distributed nationwide, including general audience and specialised channels.

Romanian television is dominated by a small number of corporations, owning multiple TV channels as well as radio stations, newspapers and media agencies. Their television business is structured around a flagship channel and a number of smaller specialized, niche channels. The biggest corporations of this kind are:

- Intact Media Group (with Antena 1 Antena 3 CNN Antena Stars Happy)
- Central European Media Enterprises (with Pro TV, Acasă, Pro Cinema, Acasa Gold and Pro Arena)
- Centrul Național Media (with Național TV, National 24 Plus and Favorit TV)

There are many localized or franchised international channels (such as HBO, MTV, Cinemax, AXN, Cartoon Network). Furthermore, there are a few independent and local broadcasters.

The TV public service broadcaster is Televiziunea Română, with five channels (TVR 1, TVR 2, TVR 3 TVR Cultural and TVR Info). TVRi is the international channel. TVR also hosts regional stations based in Timișoara, Cluj, Targu Mures, Craiova and Iasi. TVR usually is slammed for being politicised (its president and board are nominated by the parliamentary majority) and for being based on a hybrid financing system, drawing from the state budget, a special TV tax, and advertising too. Civil society pressures to achieve depoliticisation of TVR have not yet been fruitful

Two private stations, Pro TV (owned by the Bermuda-based Central European Media Enterprises) and Antena 1 (owned by Dan Voiculescu's daughter), are market leaders, sharing about 32% of the market, with public television in the third place. A feature of Romanian Television after 2000 was the boom of specialized channels.

Television broadcasts and cable television, frequency allocations, content monitoring and license allocation are done by the National Audiovisual Council (Consiliul Național al Audiovizualului, CNA).

Romania has very high penetration rates for cable television in Europe, with over 79% of all households watching television through a CATV network in 2007. The market is extremely dynamic, and dominated by two giant companies – Romanian based RCS&RDS and United States based UPC-Astral. Broadcast television is very limited because of the high penetration of cable. In the early 1990s, only two state owned TV channels were available, one only in about 20% of the country. Private TV channels were slow to appear, because of lack of experience and high start-up costs. In this environment, cable TV companies appeared and thrived, providing 15-20 foreign channels for a very low price. Many small, startup firms gradually grew, and coverage increased (coverage wars were frequent in the early period). However, this period soon ended, with consolidation around 1995–1996 with gentlemen agreements between larger companies over areas of control and pricing, with claims of monopoly abounding. This process of consolidation was completed around 2005–2006, when only two big suppliers of cable remained: UPC-Astral and RDS. Cable TV is now available in most of the country, including most rural areas. Satellite digital TV appeared in 2004.

=== Cinema ===
Cinema is one of the least popular forms of entertainment in Romania, and over 100 cinema theatres have closed down since 1989. Romania has the lowest number of cinema goers in Europe. 75 active cinemas were counted in 2008 (down from 155 in 2004), more than half being outdated theatres owned by the public company Romaniafilm. New multiplex cinemas have been opening in shopping malls, including Hollywood Multiplex, Movieplex Cinema, and Cinema City Romania. Over 85% of tickets are for US blockbusters, with only 3.6% in 2008 for domestic Romanian film productions.

=== Telecommunications ===
Romania has rapidly improving domestic and international services, especially in wireless telephony. The domestic network offers good, modern services in urban areas; 98% of telephone network is automatic while 71% is digitized; trunk network is mostly fiber-optic cable and radio relay; about 80% of exchange capacity is digital. Roughly 3,300 villages have outdated or no service.

International service data:

- satellite country code: 40;
- satellite earth station: 10 (Intelsat 4);
- digital, international, direct-dial exchanges operate in Bucharest.

The combined (fixed+mobile) telephone penetration rate is 108.3%.

==== Land lines ====
There are 4,106,000 main lines in use (June 2007). Romtelecom (owned by the Greek company OTE and the Romanian state) is the dominant fixed line provider (around 80% of the market share) and the only POTS provider. Other providers are RCS&RDS and UPC Romania.

==== Mobile ====
The penetration rate of mobile telephony exceeded 100 percent in 2007 and reached 126 percent in 2008.

There were 22.600.000 SIM cards active by December 2013. There are three GSM cellular networks (Orange, Vodafone and Cosmote) covering more than 85% of the territory (about 98% of the population), one UMTS only (Digi.Mobil) as well as one CDMA2000 only network (Romtelecom). Five networks, meaning Vodafone, Orange, Digi.Mobil, Cosmote and Zapp also provide UMTS (3G) services. Vodafone, Orange, Digi.Mobil provides voice and data services over their UMTS (3G) networks, as long as Zapp provives only data services Cosmote provides voice and data services via Zapp UMTS network. Mobile telephony had a 108% penetration rate in March 2008.

=== Internet ===
In November 2008, the number of registered .ro domains was over 340,000, of which 315,000 were active. This represents an increase of 50% in a single year.

Over 50% of the Romanian population used internet in 2014.

Newspapers' websites are the main sources of information online. Online-only news outlets (such as HotNews.ro, ziare.com, ziare.ro, news.ro, liberalist.ro, corectnews.com, psnews.ro, activenews.ro, stiripesurse.ro) are more and more common, but they usually do not have the resources to produce original and quality journalistic contents.

=== Media agencies ===
- Mediafax, a private news agency founded in 1991 and part of MediaPro group, dominates the news agency market, producing 600 news items per day, and expanding abroad in the Czech market too.
- Agerpres is the state news agency (from 1990 to 2010 known as Rompres). It was first founded in 1889 as Agentia Telegrafica a Romaniei, or Agentia Romana, as part of the Foreign Ministry, but discontinued in 1916 and re-established in 1921 as Orient-Radio Agency, later RADOR, turned by the communist regime in Agerpres in 1949. RADOR survives as the brand of the news service of the national public radio. Agerpres produces around 300 news items daily and takes part in the European Alliance of News Agencies.
- NewsIn is the newest national agency, launched in 2006 by the Realitatea-Catavencu group. It produces around 300 news items daily and focuses on business and technology, targeting companies directly rather than journalism outlets.
- Smaller agencies include AM Press and Amos News.
- International agencies with bureaus in Bucarest include Reuters, AP and France Presse, while others such as Bloomberg have permanent correspondents.

=== Trade unions ===
The largest federation of Romanian trade unions in the media sector is MediaSind, claiming around 9,000 members, of which 7,500 journalists. Most of Romania's 30,000 journalist remain unaffiliated. MediaSind has negotiated with the employers' organisations the collective contract, binding for the entire profession, although this is often not respected in practice. It also supported journalists in legal cases against arbitrary dismissals and mistreatment. Several journalists' associations exist, including The Association of Journalists in Romania, formed by 70 prominent Bucarest-based journalists.

The Romanian Press Club gathers the owners and managers of media outlets, pushing the interests of the media organisations. Local publishers are grouped into the Ownership Association of Local Publishers (APEL).

NGOs dealing with the media sector take part in the umbrella organisation called the Convention of Media Organisations (Conventia Organizatiilor de Media – COM). Its most active members are the Center for Independent Journalism, and ActiveWatch—The Media Monitoring Agency, both dealing with training and advocacy to improve the quality of journalism in Romania.

=== Regulatory authorities ===
Print and online media have no particular regulatory authority. The Culture and Mass Media Committees of the two chambers of Parliament are competent on the issue but do not exercise monitoring and control.

Television broadcasts and cable television, frequency allocations, content monitoring and license allocation are done by the National Audiovisual Council (Consiliul Național al Audiovizualului, CNA). The CNA is the main regulatory authority for the broadcast media in Romania, being the guardian of public interest. It is tasked with the implementation of the Audiovisual Law and of all by-laws, including the Code of Regulations for the Broadcasting Content, and it issues recommendations and instructions. The CNA is composed of 11 members, appointed for six years: three by each Chamber of Parliament, two by the President of Romania, and three by the government; all have to be confirmed by the Parliament. The appointments to its board are politicised, and the body thus often acts in a biased and ineffective way.

The National Authority for Communications (ANCOM) is the regulatory body for the TLC market, setting and enforcing market rules.

The National Cinematography Centre (Centrul National al Cinematografiei – CNC), part of the Ministry of Culture, supervises the cinema industry and organises competitions to finance film projects.

== Media ownership ==
=== Transparency ===
Even though the Romanian legislation in the field of media ownership transparency is fully aligned with the European standards, in practice sufficient information to assess who effectively owns and ultimately controls the media is not always available.

=== Concentration and pluralism ===
There are many media outlets in the Romanian market, but few media conglomerates control most of the audience, leaving pluralism only on the surface. Media ownership is highly concentrated and state advertising also poses a risk.

==== Legal framework ====
Audiovisual Law

The Audiovisual Law (RP 2002) applies to television and radio: (1) Article 44 establishes that concentration of media ownership and increase in audience shares must not generate dominant positions in the formation of public opinion. A media company is considered in a dominant position if its share from the national sector-based market is over 30%. Public service broadcaster is exempted. (2) The law "limits the number of media companies in which an owner can hold a majority of shares to one, with the additional possibility to hold an amount not larger than 20% from another company in the field of audiovisual communication." (3) A "transfer of an audiovisual license is only possible with the approval of the NCA and results in a complete shift of responsibilities to the new license owner (Art. 56). This is particularly relevant for cases of mergers or acquisitions, in which the NCA can intervene by not approving the transfer of license."

The National Audiovisual Council appears however "more concerned with the regulation of content than with that of the market" The Audiovisual Law does not target vertical concentration/cross-media ownership.

Competition Law

The Competition Law (RP 1996, amended in 2001) applies to all economic sectors. Its focuses mainly on preventing market dominance. Concentration is not illegal in itself, but only when it creates or consolidates a dominant position. Still, it is allowed in some cases, such as when it improves efficiency. The law also targets vertical concentration/cross-ownership. The Competition Council (Consiliul Concurenței) is in charge. The law also applies to print media. However, the CC policies are only based on economic principles, without attention for media pluralism.

==== Practice ====
There are many media outlets in Romania, but a few of them got most of the audience, making pluralism just an illusion.

In 2015 the Centre for Media Pluralism and Media Freedom (CMPF) assessed a medium risk for "Concentration of media ownership" and a high risk for the "Concentration of cross-media ownership".

In recent years there was a decrease in transnational investments and the so-called "mogulisation", a consolidation of local capital, often connected with unclear interests, both economical and political. Owners use media outlets in the interest of other business or political purposes. Over 55% of generalists and news channels are directly or indirectly politically affiliated. In 2015 the CMPF assessed a high risk of "Politicisation of control over media outlets" and a medium risk of "Political bias in the media".

Also, several cases of blackmail involving media can be cited. Some owners had connections with Securitate, the secret police of the Socialist Republic of Romania.

In 2017, Romanian media watchdog ActiveWatch warned that the private media sector was increasingly influenced by political interests. According to the NGO, "With job-insecurity and low pay commonplace, many Romanian journalists face the stark choice between obeying orders that effectively come from corporate or financial masters, or – if refusing and asking too many questions – being sacked."

Public funds

For many years after the 1990 public funds were granted "in the form of rescheduling and cancelling tax liabilities for several groups of companies" in a way that "created advantages for the existing players in the market and raised obstacles for potential newcomers and for those who did not benefited from masked subsidies".

Massive public support to media outlets cabinet was given particularly during Adrian Năstase's government (but the example was followed also on lower levels), either directly or through state companies, often with the mean of advertising. And while now public subsidies are close to zero, indirect ones, such as state advertising, are high. According to the CMPF state advertising represents a medium risk.

==== Media conglomerates ====
This table gives an overview of the main media conglomerates in Romania. More details about some groups are below:

Person(s)	Group	Media outlets
Adrian Sârbu (founder and former CEO of Media Pro)	Central European Media Enterprises/Media Pro	Pro TV, Acasă, PRO.TV Internațional, PRO Cinema, Sport.ro, Mediafax, InfoPro, Gândul, Ziarul Financiar, Business Magazin, Maxim Romania, Playboy Romania, MTV România, PubliMedia International, Ce se intampla doctore?, Descopera, Go4it, etc.
Camelia (president), Corina and Dan Voiculescu (founder)	Intact Media Group	Antena 1, Antena 3, Antena Internațional, Happy Channel (Euforia TV)
Cozmin Horea Gușă and Maricel Păcuraru (co-owners), Sorin Ovidiu Vântu	Realitatea-Cațavencu	Realitatea TV, Realitatea FM, Academia Cațavencu, Radio Guerrilla
Aydın Doğan	Doğan Holding	Kanal D Romania
Ioan and Viorel Micula	Centrul Național Media	Național TV, Național 24 Plus, Favorit TV, Transilvania TV, Crișana
Cristian Burci, Dinu Patriciu (former owner of Adevărul)	Prima/SBS Broadcasting Group/Adevărul Holding	Prima TV, Adevărul, Click!
Michael Ringier	Ringier	Libertatea, Capital
board is appointed by parliament	TVR (public television)	TVR1, TVR2, etc.

MediaPro

Bermudan Central European Media Enterprises (CME), founded by Ronald Lauder, entered the Romanian market in 1995, with Adrian Sârbu's Media Pro as a local partner, something that was required for operating an audiovisual license. Sârbu was also appointed as chief executive and chairman of CME. However, in February 2014 he was charged with tax evasion, money laundering and embezzlement, sold his shares in CME and withdrew from all positions. He was detained for 30 days in February 2015. Meanwhile, Lauder withdrew from CME board. In 2014 CME was bought by Time Warner and Pro FM was sold to RCS & RDS.

According to 2007 informations in terms of ownership the group controls 26% of the television market, 9% of the urban radio market and 5% of the print market. Its main outlet is ProTV which was launched in 1994, but it owns a total of five television stations, two national radio, the main news agency Mediafax, national and local newspaper, publishing company Publimedia. It is also the Romanian publisher of some international media outlets, namely Maxim Romania, Playboy Romania and MTV România.

The European Community defined ProTV as being dependent on the goodwill of Romanian government, because it is claimed it has granted huge loans to the media, thus allowing its rapid growth. In fact it has given the government more airtime than to the opposition in the 2004 general election.

Intact Group

Intact Group is owned by the family of Dan Voiculescu, former collaborator of Securitate, founder and former president of the Conservative Party (formerly Humanist Party), senator from 2004 to 2012. Before 2004 general election Voiculescu's party was allied to the Social Democratic Party (PSD) and Antena 1 was favourable to the party during the campaign. He was sentenced to 10 years of prison on money laundering charges. He is cited as an example of "Berlusconization" in Romania.

According to 2007 informations 15% of the print market, 2% of the urban radio market and 15% of the TV market. Antena 1 was founded in 1993 and is the main competitor of ProTV. The group owns a total of five television channel, others being Antena 2, Antena 3, Antena International, and Euforia TV, radio station Radio Romantic, news agency Amos News, many printed periodicals, a publishing and a production house.

Realitatea Media

Businessman Sorin Ovidiu Vântu was revealed in 2006 as being the key owner of Realitatea Media, which was formally controlled by Cypriot Bluelink Comunicazioni. The company also launched a news agency, NewsIn, but was not able to challenge MediaFax. Vântu has been an informer for Securitate. Sebastian Ghiță has been involved with Realitatea, but he left after a clash with Vântu and went on founding România TV.

According to 2007 informations 4% it has of the television market.

Doğan Holding

Doğan Holding is a Turkish conglomerate founded by Aydın Doğan. It owns Kanal D Romania.

Ringier Romania

In the 1990s Swiss media group Ringier was an exception to the lack of foreign investments.

Ringier controls 56% of the print market, publishing newspapers like Libertatea and magazines like Capital. From 2003 to 2010 it was also the publisher of Evenimentul Zilei.

Prima Broadcasting Group

Cristian Burci founded Prima TV in 1997. Later he associated himself with international conglomerate SBS Broadcasting Group. In 2012 Burci bought Adevărul Holding from Dinu Patriciu (Patriciu had bought Adevărul newspaper in 2006).

According to 2007 informations it has 4% of the television market. It used to control also Kiss TV, which is now owned by Antenna Group.

Lagardère

French group Lagardère entered the Romanian market in 2000 with the launch of Europa FM. "Lagardère also owned a stake in Radio XXI together with Fundaţia Secolul XXI", which has amongst its member politicians of the Social Democratic Party.

Centrul Național Media

Centrul Național Media is owned by Ioan and Viorel Micula, CEOs of European Drinks & Foods. According to 2007 informations it has 4% of the television market.

Public Service Broadcasters

The board of TVR is appointed by parliament. In 2015 the CMPF assessed a high risk for the "Independence of [Public Service Media] governance and funding". Romanian Television gave the government more airtime than to the opposition in the 2004 general election.

The national news agency Agerpres is publicly funded (€3.1 million in 2014). It was reorganized by Law 19/2003. According to 2007 informations it has 22% of television market share.

== Censorship ==
Article 30 of the Constitution of Romania, adopted in 1991 and amended in 2003, is dedicated to freedom of expression:

1. Freedom of expression of thoughts, opinions, or beliefs, and freedom of any creation, by words, in writing, in pictures, by sounds or other means of communication in public are inviolable.
2. Any censorship shall be prohibited.
3. Freedom of the press also involves the free setting up of publications.
4. No publication shall be suppressed.
5. The law may impose upon the mass media the obligation to make public their financing source.
6. Freedom of expression shall not be prejudicial to the dignity, honour, privacy of a person, and to the right to one's own image.
7. Any defamation of the country and the nation, any instigation to a war of aggression, to national, racial, class or religious hatred, any incitement to discrimination, territorial separatism, or public violence, as well as any obscene conduct contrary to morality shall be prohibited by law.
8. Civil liability for any information or creation made public falls upon the publisher or producer, the author, the producer of the artistic performance, the owner of the copying facilities, radio or television station, under the terms laid down by law. Indictable offences of the press shall be established by law.

— Art. 30, Constitution of Romania

=== Self-censorship ===
A 2008 report on "Labor Relations and Media" in South East European Network for Professionalization of Media (SEENPM) member countries noted that while in Romania there were no cases of direct censorship in mass media, there were indeed cases of "indirect censorship" or self-censorship.

Journalists risk their jobs in they do not respect the editorial policy decided by media owner, who might be a businessman protecting its business. Journalists who stay in line are rewarded.

In its report "The State of Romanian Mass Media 2020", the Center for Independent Journalism reiterated that self-censorship continues to be a problem in many newsrooms, wherein journalists are forced to tow a certain political line. The end result is that "less and less original stories come from reporters."

=== Internet censorship ===
Law 124/2015, passed on June 12, 2015, held that:

Providers of networks and services of electronic communications [...] are obliged to respect the decisions of the Supervisory Board of [National Office for Gambling (ONJN)] on restricting access to the websites of gambling unauthorized in Romania, as well as those on advertising gambling organized by a gambling operator which is unlicensed in Romania.

— Law 124/2015

According to the Civil Liberties Union for Europe this amount as establishing internet censorship. The most serious fact are that the decision can be taken by an administrative authority, without court intervention, and that the measures targets not only unauthorized gambling websites themselves, but also those advertising them. European Digital Rights (EDRi) advocacy group questions whether Facebook, YouTube or Google could become a target, too.

Since the restriction is operated by Internet service providers (ISP) through block and redirect to the ONJN website, which is the able to collect data about users who attempted to navigate to an unauthorized gambling website.

While DNS blocking can be bypassed, according to ICANN it can damage internet security. Moreover, while at the moment the infrastructure is used only for unauthorized gambling website, it could be potentially used for other purposes.

=== Charges, attacks and threats against journalists ===
- In 2002 Silvia Vranceanu of the opposition newspaper Evenimentul Zilei was intimidated after writing articles about the Social Democratic Party's regional leaders.
- Investigative journalist Iosif Costinas disappeared on 8 June 2002 and was found dead on 21 March 2003.
- On 3 December 2003 Ino Ardelean of Evenimentul Zilei was beaten unconscious in Timișoara.
- On 6 November 2004 journalist Sebastian Oancea of the Ziarul de Vrancea was harassed in Focșani by three different political and official authorities.
- On 26 January 2005 the chief of the Romanian Intelligence Service Radu Timofte admitted the telephone tapping of two Romanian journalists working for foreign media.
- In February 2006 Sebastian Oancea of Ziua and Marian Garleanu of România liberă faced charges for possessing and divulging contents of a CD relating to Romanian army action in Iraq and Afghanistan.
- On 10 March 2010 Romanian Member of the European Parliament Gigi Becali insulted ZIUA Veche journalist Cornelia Popescu after she asked him about contradictions in his declarations of financial interests.
- In January 2012 journalists from various media outlets were assaulted while covering the anti-government protests in Bucharest.
- On 16 May 2012 "Dan Buruca, an investigative reporter at Realitatea TV, was beaten by two individuals in the lobby of his apartment building".
- On 10 November 2014, Stefan Mako, an investigative journalist of Casa Jurnalistului, was detained by police after filming an arrest.
- On 1 February 2017 German freelance cameraman Christian Gesellmann was violently arrested by police in Bucharest while covering an anti-government demonstration.

== See also ==
- Romania
- Transparency of media ownership in Romania
