= Telephone numbers in Romania =

- Location of Romania (dark green)
- Country: Romania
- Continent: Europe
- Country code: 40 (44)
- International access: 00
- Long-distance: 0

The Romanian telephone numbering plan for mobile networks (numbers starting with 07) and new landline operators (numbers starting with 03) requires all subscriber numbers to be dialled in full. For landline numbers starting with 02, the dialling of the trunk digit and area code could be omitted in the past if the caller was in the same area code as the callee.

== History ==
=== Landlines ===
Prior to 1990, there was no direct international access. Numbers had 5 digits except for Bucharest, where numbers were 6 digits long. Area codes started with 9 and were 2 digits long for Bucharest (90-xxx-xxx) and 3 digits long (9pp-xx-xxx) for the rest of the country. The area surrounding Bucharest had area code 909 followed by a 5-digit number. Somewhere at the end of the 80s, some big cities' area codes were upgraded, including the last digit of the area code into the local number, thus making it 6 digits long. However, calling between non-local areas always required dialling the area code, even when the called party's code was the same as the caller's. For example, a number from Iași was 981-xx-xxx and became 98-1xx-xxx. A number from Suceava was 982-xx-xxx, and became 98-2xx-xxx. After Bucharest, Brașov was the next city to have 6-digit numbers.

In many smaller towns or rural areas, calling implied using manual commutation circuits operated by humans.

Short numbers for special services, like cab companies, were three digits long, starting with 0:

- 00 used for checking the phone line.
- 01, later 011 local exchange operator (free number)
- 02, later 021 telephone line service (possibly telephone service, if bought or rented from the telephone company)
- 023 elevators service (only in Bucharest)
- 03, later 031 telephone directory
- 05, later 051 informations
- 055 police (unknown implementation on 2-digit codes)
- 058 exact time (every 10 seconds)
- 059 weather forecast (recorded message)
- 06, later 061 ambulance (free number)
- 07, later 071 international calls via operator
- 08, later 081 fire brigade (free number)
- 09, later 091 domestic calls via operator (reverse charge or calls to manual commutation lines)

After 1989, the then-monopolistic state-owned phone company started a process of upgrading its facilities. In 1992, it started increasing the size of a number to 7 digits in Bucharest and 6 digits in the rest of the country and by changing the prefixing scheme. The long distance code was changed from 9 to 0, the area code for Bucharest became 01, while to the rest of the country was temporarily given a 0 before the older area codes. For a short period, the surrounding of Bucharest (now Ilfov county) had the area code 0179, which has been eventually included into the Bucharest numbering plan as 01-79x-xxxx. The 02 code was used for calls to the Republic of Moldova.

In 1993, the other counties were given new area codes (30 to 69). The previous area code system did not follow the country administrative regions. Outside county dialing required a national access code 0 (01-xxx-xxxx to Bucharest and 0pp-xxx-xxx for the rest of the country). In-county calling could be done without prefixes at all (xxx-xxxx to Bucharest and xxx-xxx for the rest of the country). Calling from outside meant +40-1-xxx-xxxx for Bucharest and +40-pp-xxx-xxx for the rest of the country. An international access code for calling abroad, 00, was adopted. County codes were selected on a geographical order, starting with northern Moldavia (Suceava County had 30), then going southwards to eastern Wallachia, than westwards to Banat, then northern Transylvania and it ends in the southern Transylvania, until the highest prefix, 69 (used for Sibiu County). The short numbers for special services started with 9 and were three digits long. Each town or county has its own special services, callable with the same number throughout the country.

=== Mobile numbers ===
The first mobile company was Telemobil (an ancestor of Zapp) and it started its service in 1993 using the analogue NMT technology. The numbers for this network were using the prefix 018-5xx-xxx and 018-6xx-xxx. As 01 was the area code for Bucharest, the mobile numbers had to be dialed with the prefix included, even from Bucharest. Somewhere around 1998, Telemobil changed its technology to Low Emission Mobile System (LEMS) and operated under the brand name SunTel. The service has proven ineffective and has been changed to the current technology used under the name Zapp Mobile. Since SunTel, the prefix has been changed from 018 to 098 (now 0788).

In 1996, the first GSM phone companies, Connex and Dialog, were allotted from the remaining prefixes, which were county-like, 2 digits, prefixes. In the beginning, Connex got the prefix 92 and Dialog got 94. Calling a Connex mobile from any phone in the country was 0-92-xxx-xxx. Afterwards, Connex also got 91 and 93 area codes, Dialog got 95 and 90, the newly founded Zapp Mobile got 98, and Cosmorom 96. Short numbers were now allowed in both the older form and in 4 digits long forms, both with a leading 9.

=== Toll-free and premium rate ===
At the same time, no-charge numbers were allocated to special prefixes or to the Bucharest area code, looking like 01800-xxxx . Under a special agreement, even before this reform, foreign operators could be reached at various numbers, usually in the prefix 800 (AT&T used 01800-1800). The extra-charge numbers were allotted the prefix 0189, being called like 0189-xxx-xxx. This has been extended to all area codes, as 0pp-89x-xxx, and callers could dial them without the area codes, like the regular local calls. This made them too accessible to children and sometimes telephone lines were hijacked to make calls to these services, then to be charged to the line subscribers who never made these calls by themselves. It was very customary to the aggressive advertising to write the costs of the services with small fonts, likely unreadable on the TV screen, then announcing the first 20 seconds free, writing the "free" word in bigger size, to induce the idea of the calls being all free.

One of the most popular premium rate numbering class was (01)8989-xxx, mostly used for media services and TV games. Therefore, the premium rate numbers were mostly known as "8989".

Also the most possible consecutive identical numbers is 5 (0Zpp-yxxxxx or 0Zpp-xxxxxy)

The Internet dial-up services used similar numbers, like (01)893-xxxx and (0pp)890-xxx or (0pp)893-xxxx. Some premium-rate internet dial-up services used (01)899-xxxx. However, these services were charged at most twice or three times a local call, unless called from a different area.

For a short time before the current numbering plan, two prefixes were implemented for toll-free numbers (080-xxx-xxx) and premium rate numbers (089-xxx-xxx). However, until the implementation of the current numbering plan, all the 018xx and 0xx89 numbers remained unchanged. A special call barring service has been introduced to prevent fraudulent calls to premium rate services. Even today there still are local numbers starting with 89, but only for internet dial-up, and they are migrating to the new prefix 0870.

Usually mobile phone users and abroad callers could not and cannot access no-charge or extra-charge numbers. Extra-charge SMS were sent to three digits numbers, each company having its own system.

=== Later years ===
In the last years, landline usage started to drop within Romania, as the mobile phones market was growing fast. Mobile phone companies were running out of numbers, as both the main mobile companies claimed millions upon millions of subscribers. Also, as the imminent accession to the EU was going to cause the state-owned company to lose its landline monopoly, a reform was introduced in 2002. This modified the system to a 10 digits system, of which the first is always a national access code 0. The first 4 digits, including the leading 0, give the area code, in the format 0ZYX, where X, Y are digits from 0 to 9 and Z is a digit from 2 to 9. The geographic area codes for Bucharest are 0Z1, with a digit less than all the other area codes and an extra digit to the local number. For example, the Romtelecom area code for Bucharest is 021-xxx-xxxx, and for Neamț County is 0233-xxx-xxx.

The Z digit gives the type of the area code:

- Z=2 and 3 means a landline number; the YX code is 1 (with extra digit for local number) for Bucharest, from 30 to 69 for a county code, and 70 to 79 for non-geographic landline numbers;
- Z=7 (and possibly 6 in the future) means a mobile number; 070p-xxxxxx numbers are reserved for virtual operators, while 071p-xxxxxx to 079p-xxxxxx are reserved for certain mobile company code
- Z=8 means either a toll-free (0800-xxxxxx), shared cost, personal numbering, virtual cards, pre-paid cards, or internet dial-up numbers
- Z=9 means a premium-rate number, like 0900-xxx-xxx; business and financial information and service use 0903-xxx-xxx and adult entertainment use 0906-xxx-xxx

Most new landline companies, like Vodafone Romania (formerly UPC) or Digi, were granted new area codes with Z=3, e.g. 031-xxx-xxxx for Bucharest, and 03pp-xxx-xxx for the rest of the country. Because these area codes are shared between more companies, the entire number must be dialed, even within the same network.

The numbers with Z=2, e.g. 021-xxx-xxxx or 02pp-xxx-xxx, belong almost exclusively to Telekom Romania (formerly called Romtelecom). However, smaller companies were granted numbers with these area codes, like 021-59x-xxxx, and the local numbers are assigned in descending order of the first 3 digits, like (599xxxx, 598xxxx, ..., or 529xxxx, 528xxxx, ...). In Bucharest, local numbers starting with 5 were not used by Romtelecom, hence the usage of this digit. For other counties, if 5 had not been used by Romtelecom, it is preferred for the first digit of numbers of other companies. There are few companies requesting numbering resources with Z=2, and in most cases the companies provide local service only and do not extend their network in the whole country.

Formerly within Romtelecom, local numbers were always dialed without area codes, but other numbers were always to be dialed with the area codes, even if it was the same one. However this was changed beginning with May 3, 2008: from that date Romtelecom subscribers can dial full 10 digit numbers for local calls, and since August 1, 2008 they are required to dial the full 10 digit number.

The mobile companies use prefixes starting with 7: 71 for Romtelecom, 72 and 73 for Vodafone Romania (previously branded as Connex), 74 and 75 for Orange Romania (previously branded as Dialog), 76 for Telekom Romania Mobile (previously branded as Cosmote), 77 for RCS&RDS, 78 for Zapp Mobile, etc.

The first Romanian MVNO is Enigma System (), which was granted a block of 100000 numbers in the 070 block (like 07000-xxxxx), on 27 September 2011.

Free phone numbers start with 800 (like 0-800-xxx-xxx). Strangely, some companies to whom a numbering class is allocated may not grant toll-free access to those numbers for other networks. Therefore, sometimes a "toll-free" number is advertised as "toll free only within some operator".

Some 08pp prefixes are used for various services, like:

- 0801 for shared-cost numbers
- 0802 for personal numbering
- 0806 for virtual cards
- 0807 for pre-paid cards
- 087p for Internet dial-up; for the moment, only 0870 is used

Extra-charge numbers start with 90p, with some service types with their own prefixes, like business and financial information (0903) and adult entertainment (0906). There are few used prefixes in the 09pp range, the rest of them are stated as reserved, unlike for the 08pp range, which holds more service types, either toll-free or not.

The former extra-charge numbers were starting with 021-89-xxxxx for Bucharest and 02pp-89x-xxx for the other regions, thus being a subset of the numbers owned by Romtelecom. Currently these numbers are sometimes used for premium rate or normal Internet dial-up services. The usage of these numbers for such services is however discouraged, as the new prefix for Internet dial-up is 0870. There are some dial-up services using these numbers, and most of them begin with (021- or 02pp-)893 or 899.

Calling from Romania to Romania usually implies using the full 10 digits number. Romtelecom county codes were chosen on a geographical order, starting with northern Moldavia (Suceava County had 30), then going southwards to eastern Wallachia, than westwards to southern Transylvania, than northwards, closing the circle with the highest prefix, 69 (used for Sibiu County). These county codes were extended to all landline area codes.

Extra-charge SMS are sent to three or four digits numbers, each company having its own system.

Short numbers are allowed in both the 3 digits and in 4 digits forms, with a leading 9, like 981 for the fire brigade, 961 for ambulance, 955 for police or 9xxx for various companies, including taxi, medical services, guards, information and others. Each town or county has its own special services, like firefighters, police, with the same number. The station to which these calls are directed is chosen based on location. Unlike for Bucharest, other regions use short numbers with 3 digits only, including the leading 9. These services are provided by Romtelecom, therefore the area code must be dialed before the number when calling from other network.

The short local numbers which are the same in the whole country are:

- 02YX-922 Romtelecom devices service (for phones and other equipment bought or rented from Romtelecom), 021-9222 for Bucharest
- 02YX-925 Romtelecom GBM sales and customer support, 021-9255 for Bucharest
- 02YX-923 or 02YX-926 elevator service, 021-923(x) or 021-926(x) for more companies in Bucharest
- 02YX-928 former local gas company; new companies use other numbers; in Bucharest 021-928x for more gas companies
- 02YX-929 electricity company; 021-9291 for Bucharest and 021-9292 for surrounding area
- 02YX-953 former state-owned taxi company; the privatised company still holds this number, 021-9531 for Bucharest
- 02YX-954 former state-owned freight taxi company; the privatised company still holds this number, 021-9541 for Bucharest
- 02YX-955 police, 021-9555 for Bucharest; no longer toll-free since the implementation of 112
- 02YX-956 gendarmerie, 021-9566 for Bucharest; formerly a taxi company number in Bucharest
- 02YX-959 Border police, 021-9590 for Bucharest; (probably on counties along the country border or holding international airports)
- 02YX-961 state-owned ambulance and medical service 021-9611 for Bucharest; allegedly no longer toll-free since the implementation of 112
- 971 international calls via operator (this Romtelecom service is an exception and keeps the original short format even after August 1, 2008)
- 02YX-981 fire brigade, 021-9811 for Bucharest; allegedly no longer toll-free since the implementation of 112
- 991 domestic calls via operator, for reverse charge calls (this Romtelecom service is another exception and keeps the original short format even after August 1, 2008)

Some short numbers are used for network services, for rotary telephones which cannot dial * and #.

Romania joined the European initiative for a continent-wide emergency number, 112. With the implementation of this service, the former emergency numbers are no longer toll-free, unless they are redirected to 112.

Number portability is planned to be available after October 21, 2008.

Besides the 112 service, and the reserved 11x numbers, a number may not begin with 1. There are some special codes which start with 1:

- 10xx carrier selection, with intermediate tone
- 16xx carrier selection, followed by number
- 19x(...) nationwide short numbers (implemented since May 2, 2008)
  - 1921 Romtelecom phone line service
  - 1930 Romtelecom sales and customer support
  - 118932 Romtelecom directory information
  - 1932 Romtelecom directory information in Hungarian language
  - 1951 Various information service
  - 1957 telegrams
  - 1958 current time announcement (every 10 seconds)

When calling from abroad, the leading zero is dropped and replaced with the international access code and the country code, like +40-xxx-xxx-xxx. Only regular landline and mobile phones are accessible from outside Romania.

When calling abroad from Romania, the international access code is 00. From mobile devices the + is also supported, as per the GSM system standard.

The following are the national prefixes by county, where a can be 2 (for Orange - ex Telekom) or 3 (for Vodafone - ex UPC/DIGI):

County	Code
Alba	0a58
Arad	0a57
Argeș	0a48
Bacău	0a34
Bihor	0a59
Bistrița-Năsăud	0a63
Botoșani	0a31
Brașov	0a68
Brăila	0a39
București	0a1
Buzău	0a38
Caraș-Severin	0a55
Călărași	0a42
Cluj	0a64
Constanța	0a41
Covasna	0a67
Dâmbovița	0a45
Dolj	0a51
Galați	0a36
Giurgiu	0a46
Gorj	0a53
Harghita	0a66
Hunedoara	0a54
Ialomița	0a43
Iași	0a32
Ilfov	0a1
Maramureș	0a62
Mehedinți	0a52
Mureș	0a65
Neamț	0a33
Olt	0a49
Prahova	0a44
Satu Mare	0a61
Sălaj	0a60
Sibiu	0a69
Suceava	0a30
Teleorman	0a47
Timiș	0a56
Tulcea	0a40
Vaslui	0a35
Vâlcea	0a50
Vrancea	0a37
