= Digi 4K =

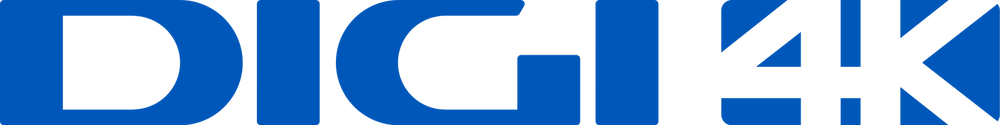

Programming
- Language: Romanian
- Picture format: 2160p (4K UHD)

Ownership
- Owner: RCS & RDS
- Sister channels: Digi Sport; Digi 24; Digi Animal World; Digi Life; Digi World; Film Now; H!T Music Channel; Hora TV; Music Channel; U TV

History
- Launched: November 23, 2018

Links
- Website: https://www.digi4k.ro/

Digi 4K is a Romanian television channel owned by the telecommunications company RCS & RDS, specializing in broadcasting content in ultra high-definition (UHD). Launched on November 23, 2018, Digi 4K became Romania’s first 4K TV channel, showcasing sports events, films, documentaries, and entertainment programming in 2160p resolution. The channel operates with a 16:9 aspect ratio. Digi 4K is part of the wider Digi network, which includes sister channels such as Digi 24, Digi Sport, Film Now, Digi World, and more. Its programming emphasizes high-clarity visuals and immersive experiences, particularly for live sports like UEFA Champions League, UEFA Europa League, UEFA Conference League, Premier League, La Liga, Bundesliga and Liga I.

The first sporting event broadcast by DIGI 4K was the Formula 1 Grand Prix in Abu Dhabi, on November 25, 2018.
