= Alhassan Suhuyini =

Ghanaian broadcast journalist and politician

Hon. Alhassan Saibu Suhuyini
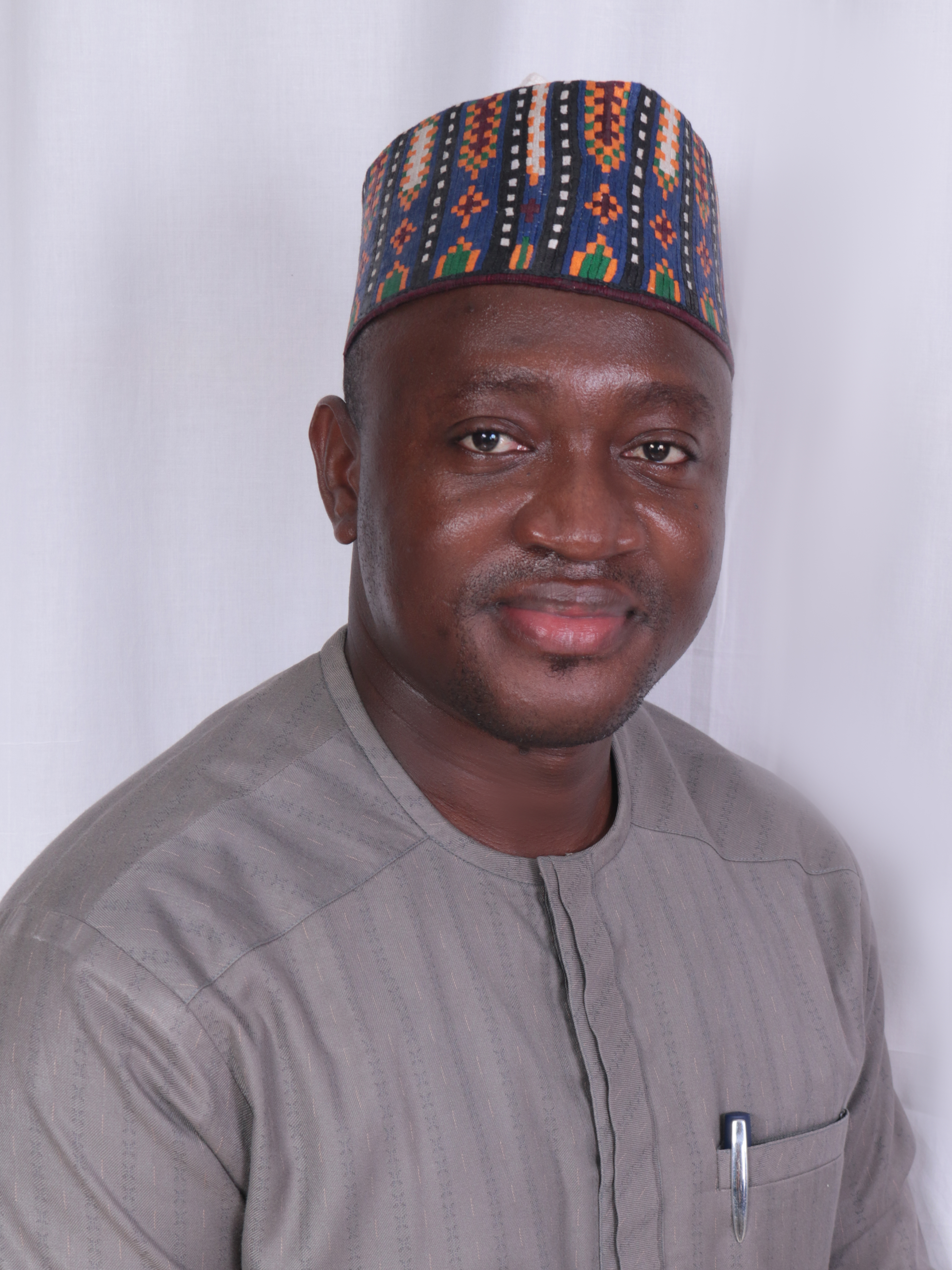

Member of the Ghana Parliament for Tamale North Constituency
- Incumbent
- Assumed office 2017
- Preceded by: Alhassan Dahamani

Personal details
- Born: 12 September 1979 (age 47) Tamale, Ghana
- Party: National Democratic Congress
- Spouse: Hamdiya Amadu Yakubu
- Children: 1
- Education: Ghana Institute of Management and Public Administration
- Occupation: Journalist

Alhassan Saibu Suhuyini
- Known for: "Alhaji and Alhaji" Talk Show

Alhassan Sayibu Suhuyini (born 12 September 1979) is a Ghanaian broadcast journalist and politician. He belongs to the National Democratic Congress. He is currently a member of the eighth Parliament of the Fourth Republic of Ghana representing Tamale North. Suhuyini was re-elected as a member of parliament for Tamale North during the 2024 Ghanaian general election on the ticket of National Democratic Congress. He was appointed as a Deputy Minister-Designate for Roads & Highways by president Jonh Dramani Mahama.

He is a host of two of the station's flagship programs as Ghanaian broadcast journalist who works at Radio Gold in Accra.

He holds a teaching qualification. From Ghana Institute of Management and public Administration He pursued his B.sc. public administration and M.sc. Development Management. He's a Muslim by religion. He also a committee member of land and natural resources. He was member of parliament of the 7th and 8th Republic of Ghana.

== Education ==
Alhassan Suhuyini attended Ghana Secondary School now Ghana Senior High School (Tamale), GHANASCO in Tamale. He holds a B.Sc. Public Administration and an M.Sc. Development management from Ghana Institute of Management and Public Administration. His career as a radio presenter started at Diamond FM in Tamale before he moved to the capital of Ghana. He had brief stints with Citi FM and Metro TV in Accra before settling with Radio Gold. He is currently pursuing his PhD in Public Administration.

== Career ==
His career as a radio presenter started at Diamond FM in Tamale before he moved to the capital of Ghana. He had brief stints with Citi FM and Metro TV in Accra before settling with Radio Gold. He was voted Talk Show Host of the year in 2011, 2012 and 2013 by Radio listeners in Ghana at the Ghana Radio and Television Personality Awards. In 2013 he was selected and sponsored by the South Korean government to tour South Korea as part of its Next Generational Leaders from Africa program. He was a delegate at the 2014 International Visitor Leadership Program, a United States Department of State professional exchange program. He worked at Radio Gold in Accra, where he was the host of two of the station's flagship programs; the morning show called the "Gold Power Drive" and the weekend socio-economic and political current affairs program - Alhaji and Alhaji talk show.

== Political career ==
He was appointed in 2013 by president John Dramani Mahama as board member of Ghana Civil Aviation Authority (GCAA). As of 2014 he was the Communications Manager for the National Hajj Council (Ghana). He won the Tamale North seat by the ticket of the National Democratic Congress in the 2016 General election to become the member of parliament. He won the seat by getting 21,280 votes representing 67.79% of the total number. Despite being member of Parliament, he is also doing communication for his party. Suhuyini was re-elected in the 2020 general elections to represent the Tamale North Constituency in Parliament. In May 2023, Suhuyini was confirmed as Parliamentary Candidate of the National Democratic Congress, after no one filed to contest him for the position at close of nomination. In the 2024 general election, he retained the seat in ticket of the NDC as MP for Tamale North Constituency in Parliament by getting 28,521 votes whiles his contender had 12,317.

He has helped in the construction of roads as deputy minister of roads in Tamale north constituency.

== Committees ==
1.Lands and forestry Committees 2.Appointments committee

== Personal life ==
Suhuyini is a trained teacher. He married Hamdiya Amadu Yakubu Vorsky in 2013.
