= The Money Channel =

- Country: Romania
- Broadcast area: National; also distributed in Moldova
- Headquarters: Bucharest

Programming
- Picture format: 4:3 (576i, SDTV)

Ownership
- Owner: Realitatea-Caţavencu

History
- Launched: 1 May 2006
- Closed: 25 April 2015

Links
- Website: www.tmctv.ro

Availability

Terrestrial
- Digital Television: Channel 9

The Money Channel was a TV channel of Realitatea-Caţavencu, owned by Sorin-Ovidiu Vântu.

The Money Channel was the first business TV channel in Romania. It broadcast information about the Stock Exchange in Romania, and also news, mainly economic, but also politics, weather and sport. It was launched in May 2006 and closed in April 2015.
