= The Kryptonite Sparks =

Romanian indie rock band

- Origin: Botoșani, Romania
- Genres: Indie rock; alternative rock; art rock; psychedelic rock; garage rock; post-punk revival; punk rock (early)
- Works: The Kryptonite Sparks, Doi // A Doua Undă De Bruiaj
- Years active: 2009-present
- Label: Universal Music Romania
- Members: Călin-Răzvan Diaconu; Rareș Diaconu
- Past members: Mădălin Antonesei; Răzvan Anton; Iulian Macovei; Ștefan "Șteff" Boriceanu
- Website: thekryptonitesparks.com

The Kryptonite Sparks, abbreviated as TKS, are a Romanian indie rock band formed in Botoșani in 2009.

The band's current line-up consists of lead vocalist and guitarist Călin-Răzvan Diaconu, vocalist and bass player Rareș Diaconu and drummer Ștefan “Șteff” Boriceanu.

They have released one live album: Fac Io, Nu Fac Io (2019), two extended plays: The Kryptonite Sparks (2013), Doi // A Doua Undă De Bruiaj (2016) and fourteen singles to date.

"Și Golanii Beau Ceai" (2016) was their first single to reach #1 on Radio Guerrilla Top 40 charts, followed by "Ne Ascundem" (2017), "Noapte În Nord" (2017), "Interlocutor" (2018) and "3301_(Suflete_în_Ghiozdan)" (2021).

The band have featured at many festivals including Electric Castle, SummerWell, Peninsula. They have toured extensively throughout Romania, with international shows including France, Serbia, Bulgaria and Greece. They have won a number of awards including "Best Alternative Newcomer 2014/2015” awarded by Metalhead Awards.

== History ==
=== 2009-2011: Formation ===
Călin-Răzvan Diaconu originally formed the band during high-school, by then an acoustic duo together with Mădălin Antonesei. Răzvan's younger brother, Rareș Diaconu joined, taking bass duties. During a show in a local pub in Botoșani they met Răzvan Anton which later joined the band as a drummer. They played local gigs in and around Botoșani, playing blues-rock and progressive rock covers, experimenting with live improvisation. They were sometimes accompanied by Iulian Macovei on trumpet.

It was during this period that Călin-Răzvan Diaconu wrote their first songs, most of them being played live but not released up to date.

=== 2012-2013: The Kryptonite Sparks (EP) ===
As brothers Călin-Răzvan Diaconu and Rareș Diaconu went on to London to pursue their musical studies (at the Institute of Contemporary Music Performance), the band only met and played during summer breaks.

In the summer of 2012 the band rented studio time at Studio Attic, Bucharest and self-produced their first EP, The Kryptonite Sparks. Seeing that they had no place to stay in Bucharest, the band slept on the studio's couches during the recording of the songs. Although the tracks were initially recorded with Mădălin Antonesei on vocals, seeing as he decided to leave the band, Călin-Răzvan Diaconu took lead vocals role and re-tracked the vocals. The album was engineered by Șerban Valeriu and Bărbășelu Constantin, mixed by Rareș Totu and mastered at Sage Audio.

The EP was self-released DIY, CD's printed and packaged in the band's rehearsal space, signed and distributed for free at shows and shared around the community. They later re-released the disc in 2013 as an official release.

During their studies, Călin-Răzvan Diaconu played guitar in Audrey Riley’s We Are Children (We Make Sound) orchestra and Rareș played in the university’s "ICMP Band".

=== 2015-2016: Doi // A Doua Undă De Bruiaj (EP) ===
In 2015, while playing as opening act for Vița de Vie tour, they talked with Adrian Despot about producing their next EP. Despot's wanted to capture the band as they sounded in their live performances. The songs were recorded during 2015 at Sysound Studios, Bucharest and engineered by Mihai Pop.

The band signed with Universal Music Romania for the release.

The EP was greeted with favorable reviews from critics and radios. “Și Golanii Beau Ceai” and “Ești” staying at number one for multiple weeks on Radio Guerrilla's Top 40, and getting airplay from mainstream radio Europa FM, TANANANA, Gold FM, Radio România Cultural, RFi.

=== 2014-2019: Extensive touring ===
In 2014 both Călin-Răzvan Diaconu and Rareș Diaconu graduated from The Institute of Contemporary Music Performance, with Bachelor of Music degrees. They moved back to Romania. While playing a show in Iași, the band was heard by Underground club manager Lili which introduced them to their future manager and booking agent, Alin Voica, founder of Dark Side Booking Academy. In order to being able to collaborate, it meant that the band had to move to Bucharest.

Spotted by Adrian Despot during the summer of 2014, the band was invited to be the opening act on the 15th anniversary tour for Vița de Vie first album, “Fenomental”

In 2015 they go on another national tour "Best Alternative Newcomers Tour" with Pinholes. In the same year the band opened for Black Label Society in Dom Omladine, Belgrade, Serbia.

In 2016-2017 they did their first international tour encompassing 30 cities, "The Interplanetary Endeavour". In September the band opens for The Cat Empire at Arenele Romane, Bucharest.

In 2017 they are part of the "Red Bull Tour Bus", in which the stage was placed on top of an old modified Tour Bus The fall of 2017 brought them together with Romanian pop star Loredana Groza, at Sala Palatului. The band re-arranged and performed one of her singles, "Bună seara, iubite".

While releasing a new single, "Interlocutor" on Antena 1 the band went up with on another national tour in 2018, "InterlocuTOUR"

In 2018 Călin-Răzvan Diaconu travelled to Sweden to film the clip for their newest single, "Noapte în Nord"

In 2019 they played at Olympic gold medalist winner for canoe racing, Ivan Patzaichin festival, RowFest The band has played bigger festivals: Electric Castle, SummerWell, Peninsula, SnowFest, Europa FM.

The band's shows had long improvisational moments and publing interaction, which were invited to sing and dance on stage, tell jokes, serve drinks and remove items of clothing. They often used props on stage: Elvira (bottom half of a manequin), Marcel (plastic pig), Kelly Picketrish (toy xylophone), Korgonzolla (a Korg mini keyboard), three papier-mache reindeer heads. "They brought a breath of fresh air to Romanian underground music".

=== 2020-present: COVID-19, Building TKS Lil' Mansion ===
Due to the COVID-19 crisis of 2020, their live performances were canceled, the band playing live through a series of networked music performances.

They started a series of video game livestreaming / comedy show called Friday Gaming Nights on Twitch, in which they invited their friends and fans to play together online, while in lockdown.

They also started working on a weekly vlog called "Scântei de Kryptonită" During the pandemic the band started working with British mixing engineer Chris Sheldon. Their following singles "Sincrodestin", "3310_(Suflete_în_Ghizodan)", "Dacă vii azi" were mixed by him.

In 2021 they released "3310_(Suflete_în_Ghiozdan)", a single that critiques the poor educational system of Romania, and the increasing procent of functional illiteracy the country faces.

Following manager Alin Voica's departure from Romania, the band signed with Codruț Dumitrescu, at Overground Music.

In 2020 the band stated that their upcoming merchandise will be vegan, fair wear and made out of organic cotton.

In 2023 Ștefan "Șteff" Bouriceanu replaced Răzvan Anton on drums.

In October 2024, they released their first debut studio album called “ERAI /// Eterna Reîntoarcere A Identicului”. It feature their singles “La Tine Acasǎ”, “Sincrodestin”, “Dacǎ Vii Azi”, “Antidemotivațional”, “3310_(Suflete_în_ghiozdan)” and “Cine Rade La Urma”

== Discography ==
Albums

- ERAI /// Eterna Reîntoarcere A Identicului (2024)

Extended plays

- The Kryptonite Sparks (2013)
- Doi // A Doua Undă De Bruiaj (2016)

Singles

- Scântei (2013)
- Nu Vreau Nimic (2014)
- Și Golanii Beau Ceai (2016)
- Ne Ascundem (2017)
- Noapte În Nord (2017)
- Interlocutor (2018)
- Până Acasă La Ai Mei (2018)
- Cine Râde La Urmă (2020)
- Sincrodestin (2021)
- 3310_suflete_în_ghiozdan (2021)
- Dacă Vii Azi (2021)
- August (2022)
- Entropica (2022)
- La Sfârșit (2023)
- Colindă În Prag (2023)
- La Tine Acasă (2024)
- Antidemotivațional (2024)
- Zi După Zi După Zi (2024)
- Iunie (2026)

Live albums

- Fac Io, Nu Fac Io (2019)
