= Nicolae Popa =

Nicolae Popa may refer to:

- Nicolae Popa (judge) (1939–2024), Romanian judge
- Nicolae Popa (businessman) (born c. 1965), Romanian businessman
