= Music Channel (Romania) =

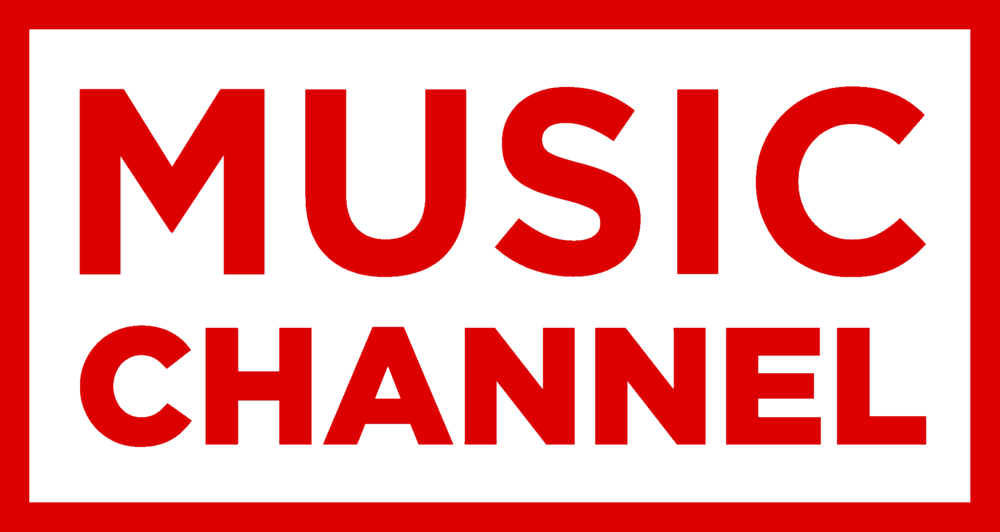
- Country: Romania

Ownership
- Owner: RCS & RDS
- Sister channels: Digi 24; Digi Animal World; Digi Life; Digi Sport; Digi World; Digi 4K; Film Now; H!T Music Channel; Hora TV; U TV

History
- Launched: May 28, 2008

Links
- Website: 1music.ro

Music Channel is a Romanian music television channel, opened on May 28, 2008. On January 1, 2010 was launched a version in Hungary. Music Channel came to prominence as the first Romanian TV station to host Live streaming on the internet. The TV station is known for hosting the yearly Romanian Music Awards Unlikely to MTV Romania and Kiss TV, the station is more genre-broadcasting, dividing its airplay into the four most prominent music genres — pop, rock, urban and dance, much in the likes of UTV. Noteworthy, Music Channel is known for also airing Latin pop, adult contemporary, J-pop and K-pop among other genres that don't receive significant airplay from other music stations. Compared by many to VH1, the TV station conceived many Top-Tens and Top-100s and starting late-November they start playing Christmas music.

Its sister channel, H!t Music Channel was launched on September 1, 2011. Its closure in Hungary was announced on 27 June 2022, citing loss-making operations as the reason for the decision, along with its other sister channels.

Since 2024, Music Channel broadcasts only Romanian music and adverts.
