= Telesport =

- Country: Romania
- Broadcast area: National; also distributed in Moldova; Macedonia
- Headquarters: Bucharest

Ownership
- Owner: Telesport Intermedia (through Realitatea Media)

History
- Launched: 1 December 2003
- Closed: 10 May 2011

Links
- Website: www.telesport.ro

Telesport was the first Romanian sports channel launched on 1 December 2003, by Silviu Prigoană, the man behind Taraf TV and Etno TV. On March 28 2008, Realitatea-Caţavencu Group bought the station and brought a new team to manage the channel, a team led by Vlad Enăchescu, former manager at TVR1. In 2010, Romtelecom attempted to buy the channel, but failed. In return, Romtelecom signed contracts with the majority of Telesport team, including Vlad Enăchescu, all of them founding Dolce Sport.

Without a team and without quality programs, Telesport filed for bankruptcy and on 10 May 2011 lost the broadcast licence.
