= Steaua Liberă =

- Website type: Sports website
- Available in: Romanian
- Website: www.steaualibera.com
- Current status: Active

Steaua Liberă is a sport website created by and for the supporters of Steaua București sports club. The website is widely known among Romanian press, with TV station Antena 1 and other media describing it as a ”hard and influential core” within the CSA Steaua București fans community.

== History ==
Steaua Liberă started as a movement by Steaua supporters against Gigi Becali, in the mid-2000s, when everybody thought that Becali's team, Fotbal Club FCSB, was Steaua Bucharest. The fans then took the movement online, where they formed a powerful community, with an important voice in Romanian football, followed closely by the Romanian press.

The community expanded quickly on Facebook and, in December 2016, it launched its own website. On the website, the community constantly published Steaua Bucharest-related articles, interviews, and much more. Steaua Liberă does not refrain from attacking those it believes are doing harm to the Steaua Bucharest club, with important Romanian newspapers such as Gazeta Sporturilor or ProSport constantly quoting them

=== Supporting Colonel Florin Talpan, Steaua Bucharest's legal adviser ===
In addition to supporting club coaches and players, Steaua Liberă has also expressed its support for Colonel Florin-Costel Talpan, Steaua Bucharest's legal adviser. Through his actions, Talpan has managed to beat Becali in court and to obtain a court orders forbidding Fotbal Club FCSB from using the Steaua Bucharest name and brand. He was also instrumental in reactivating the Steaua Bucharest football team, an achievement which brought a lot of Steaua Bucharest fans to his side.

Numerous times, Steaua Liberă has announced its support for Talpan also calling for him to be named president of the Steaua Bucharest club.

=== Reporting important Steaua Bucharest news ===
The site's reputation increased after it published numerous important breaking news articles related to Steaua Bucharest and Romanian football. One of the first such articles was that presenting and explaining the reasoning behind the decision through which the Bucharest Court of Appeals forbade Fotbal Club FCSB from using the "Steaua" name. Using the information published on Steaua Liberă, the Romanian press investigated the case further

Other important articles published by Steaua Liberă include player transfers, general news about Steaua Bucharest, Florin Talpan's promotion to the rank of colonel, news about the numerous scandals within the Steaua club or information about the lawsuits between Steaua Bucharest and Fotbal Club FCSB. All of these have caused the site's reputation and credibility to grow. The number of its fans and followers also increased.

=== Expanding to other platforms ===
In June 2017, Steaua Liberă launched its own YouTube channel, also called Steaua Liberă. Its popularity also increased rapidly, managing to reach over 100 videos published in less than a year, most of them original content, and to gather over 2,000 subscribers. One of the best days for the Steaua Liberă YouTube channel occurred on May 8, 2018, when an interview with Florin Talpan went viral, with numerous newspapers and television channels sharing it with their audiences.

Following the success it registered on YouTube, Steaua Liberă also expanded to Twitter and Instagram.

On July 20, 2020, Costin Ștucan, a journalist working for Gazeta Sporturilor and the host of the GSP Live internet show, invited Adrian Topîrceanu, also known as Adi 2, a member of Steaua Liberă, on his show. On the show, Adi 2 revealed several important documents, one of them showing that Fotbal Club FCSB is functioning illegally.

== Conflict with the FC FCSB supporters ==
In addition to their traditional rivalries with the supporters of CS Rapid Bucuresti and CS Dinamo București, the members of the Steaua Liberă community are also involved in a conflict with the supporters of FC FCSB, whom they constantly refer to as ”sheep”, due to the fact that, in his youth, Gigi Becali, the man running FC FCSB, used to be a shepherd.
