= Telekom Romania Mobile =

Mobile network company in Romania

Telekom Romania Mobile Communications SA
- Formerly: Cosmorom (1999–2005); Cosmote (2005–2014); Telekom Romania (2014–2021); Telekom Romania Mobile (2021–2026)
- Type: Subsidiary
- Industry: Telecommunications
- Founded: July 30, 1990; 36 years ago (as ROM-POST-TELECOM); 1999; 27 years ago (as Cosmorom)
- Fate: Merged by absorption into Vodafone Romania
- Successor: Vodafone Romania
- Headquarters: Bucharest, Romania
- Services: Mobile phone telecommunications
- Revenue: ▼€380 million (2021)
- Net income: ▲€36 million (2021)
- Owners: OTE (2005–2025); Vodafone Romania (2025–present)
- Number of employees: 853 (2021)
- Website: Official website

Telekom Romania Mobile Communications S.A. was a mobile network company in Romania, jointly owned by Vodafone Romania (majority) and DIGI Romania (minority). Telekom Romania Mobile had 3.5 million subscribers with 15% market share as of July 2021.

The network operated together with Telekom Romania Communications (which traces its ancestry back to ROM-POST-TELECOM, later renamed Romtelecom) from 2014 until 2021 under the same brand Telekom. Both companies were majority owned by OTE, which in turn is controlled by Deutsche Telekom.

On November 6, 2020, OTE agreed to sell the 54% stake in the fixed network company Telekom Romania Communications to Orange Romania for €295 million. In order for the transaction to be approved by the authorities, OTE has committed to buy the remaining 30% of shares in Telekom Romania Mobile, which operates the mobile network. The transaction was completed in July 2021.

OTE did not succeed in selling the mobile phone company after the transaction with Digi failed due to the fact that it only wanted to buy cell sites and mobile frequencies, thus making Deutsche Telekom to rebrand it as Telekom Mobile and keep the company in OTE's portfolio until it finds a buyer.

In November 2023, OTE agreed to sell Telekom Romania Mobile to Clever Group, the owner of Prima TV. However, Clever Group later withdrew from this agreement. In October 2024, Vodafone and Digi entered into an agreement jointly to acquire the company.

On September 30, 2025, Vodafone and DIGI completed the acquisition, resulting in Vodafone getting the postpaid subscribers, business clients, stores, staff, most of the technical infrastructure and partly spectrum, while DIGI getting prepaid customers, most of spectrum and partly (14% of) technical infrastructure. The total acquisition costed 70 million euros, with Vodafone spending 30 million (including debts), and DIGI spending 40 million. Unification of technical infrastructures, including migration of existing postpaid and prepaid customers, to the respective networks, is ongoing for both providers, which is expected to finish around beginning of 2026.

Telekom Romania Mobile was absorbed by Vodafone, with the legal merger becoming effective after July 1, 2026.

== History ==
=== Cosmorom ===
The company was launched as Cosmorom in 1999 by Romtelecom as its mobile telephony brand and entered service in April 2000. In the first years, the company failed to gain market share. Having around 1% market share and financial losses, there were talks about the selling of the company, but the decision was delayed several times due to disagreement between OTE, the majority owner of Romtelecom and the Romanian Government. In January 2004 Romtelecom decided to sell a majority stake in the company. Buying offers were made by Mobilkom (now A1 Telekom Austria), which was seen as a favorite, and the Hungarian company Matev of Deutsche Telekom. But in the end, the Greek company OTE, which owned 54% of Cosmorom's parent company, decided to buy 70% of the company, leaving Romtelecom with the remaining 30%.

=== Cosmote Romania ===
In July 2005 OTE's mobile division Cosmote relaunched the mobile operator separate from the fixed services company Romtelecom, with a popular offer for prepaid services. In December 2005 had approximately 50,000 subscribers. The process of relaunching, started with the rebranding as Cosmote on December 6, 2005. On March 2, 2006, it started a wide advertising campaign on the prepaid market, offering a limited number of SIM cards with 2000 free minutes within the network per month for a low price (3 euro). The network could no longer cope with the large number of users and network failures often occurred. So on March 20, the company announced that the offer will work until March 31 only for people who have activated the service until March 22.

On June 30, 2009 Cosmote acquired Zapp Mobile, a CDMA mobile operator with 374,000 subscribers, who also had a 3G license. Following Zapp acquisition, Cosmote launched 3G service. At the end of 2013, Cosmote Romania had 6.1 million customers, of which 25.9% were postpaid subscribers and the rest were users of prepaid services.

=== Telekom Romania ===
On September 12, 2014, Romtelecom and Cosmote România unified mobile and fixed services under a single brand and changed their respective legal names to Telekom Romania Communications and Telekom Romania Mobile Communications. The company tried to attract postpaid customers, including with bundling mobile and fixed services, but the market share dropped. The company raised prices, but financial losses continued.

== Shareholders ==
Telekom Romania Mobile Communications S.A. (mobile services):

- West Network Invest S.A. - 99.9999994%
- Societatea Națională de Radiocomunicații S.A - 0.0000006%

== Radio Frequency Summary ==
Frequencies used on the Telekom Romania Mobile Network
MCC	MNC	Frequency	Band Number	Protocol (Downlink/Uplink speed)	Class	Notes
226	03	900 MHz	8	GSM/GPRS/EDGE	2G	
226	03	1800 MHz	3	GSM/GPRS/EDGE	2G	
226	03	800 MHz	20	LTE (37.5 Mbit/s/12.5 Mbit/s)	4G	
226	03	900 MHz	8	LTE (37.5 Mbit/s/12.5 Mbit/s)	4G	
226	03	1800 MHz	3	LTE (150 Mbit/s/50 Mbit/s)	4G	
226	03	2100 MHz	1	LTE (112.5 Mbit/s/37.5 Mbit/s)	4G	
226	03	2100 MHz	n1	NR NSA (250 Mbit/s/50 Mbit/s)	5G	
