= Zoltán Teszári =

Romanian IT entrepreneur (born 1970)

- Born: 14 September 1970 (age 55); Oradea
- Occupation: Businessman

Zoltán Teszári (Hungarian pronunciation: [ˈzoltaːn ˈtɛsaːri]; born 14 September 1970 in Oradea) is a Romanian businessman of Hungarian ethnicity. He is the founder of Digi Communications.

== Career ==
In 1990, Teszári participated in the European Junior Judo Championships in Turkey, where he won silver. His business career began when he started selling ice cream with a friend. The ice cream business later developed into the distribution of ice cream cones.

In 1994, he founded Romanian Cable Systems, which later became RCS & RDS (Romania Cable System & Romania Data System).

In the list of the 300 richest Romanians by the Romanian business weekly Capital, Teszári ranked 4th in 2013 with a fortune of €690–700 million (he was the first among Hungarians in Romania).

As of April 2022, Forbes ranked him as the 5th-richest person in Romania with a net worth of $800 million.

== Personal life ==
Teszári is married and has one child.
