= National Audiovisual Council =

National Audiovisual Council (Romania)
Agency overview
- Formed: 1992
- Jurisdiction: Government of Romania
- Employees: 11
- Annual budget: 14.000 Lei Romanian Leu (2022)
- Agency executive: Cristina Pocora
- Parent department: Ministry of Transport and Telecommunications (Romania)
- Website: www.cna.ro

The National Audiovisual Council (Romanian: Consiliul Național al Audiovizualului, CNA) is the official regulatory agency for the audio-visual market (radio, television) in Romania.

Television broadcasts and cable television, frequency allocations, content monitoring, censorship, license allocation are done by the CNA, that is the main regulatory authority for the broadcast media in Romania. The appointments to its board are politicized, the body thus often acts in a biased and ineffective way.

== TV warning signs and previsions ==
AP (Parental Guidance) This program can be watched by children up to age of 12 only with the consent or with their parents or family.

12 - This program is prohibited for children under 12 years of age (Art. 23 (1) Audiovisual productions forbidden to children under 12 years of age shall be broadcast only after 20:00 and shall be permanently accompanied by a warning sign representing a white circle, and inside it, on a transparent background, the number 12 White color)

15 - This program is forbidden to children under 15 years of age (Article 24 1. Audiovisual productions forbidden to children under 15 years of age shall be broadcast only between 23:00 and 06:00 and shall be permanently accompanied by a warning sign representing a white circle, and inside it, on a transparent background, white number 15; except for feature films, series and documentaries classified 15, in which case the time allowed is 22:00 and 06:00). It used to be 16 but replaced by 15 in 2006.

18 - This program is forbidden to children under 18 years of age (Article 24 1. Audiovisual productions forbidden to children under the age of 18 shall be broadcast only between 01:00 and 06:00 and shall be permanently accompanied by a warning sign representing a white circle, and inside it, on a transparent background, white number 18)

Art. 39 (2) of the Audiovisual Code: According to the provisions invoked, the broadcasting on television and broadcasting services of programs which may affect the physical, mental or moral development of minors can be done only if, by choosing the time slot, by coding or as a result of other conditional access systems, ensure that minors in the transmission area, in normal situations, cannot hear or see those broadcasts.

Article 40 (3) of the Audiovisual Code: "Moderators, presenters and producers of programs have an obligation not to use or allow guests to use abusive language or incite violence against other people."

Art. 18 of the Audiovisual Code: According to the previsions invoked, it cannot be broadcast in the time slot 06:00 to 23:00, productions featuring scenes of mental language violence repeatedly or a high degree of intensity and severity, those that present sex scenes, trivial language or behavior, vulgar or obscene, People in Degrading Poses, even if they got consent (Degrading Poses in Romanian version means nudity, genitalia and other fetishes) and Free fights not regulated by National or International Sports Federations.

Art. 101 (3) of the Audiovisual Code: Content show that offer cash prizes or in stuff, they can be broadcast only live and in the time slot 22:00 to 06:00.

== See also ==
- Media of Romania
- Federal Communications Commission
