= UTV Romania =

UTV
- Country: Romania
- Network: Radio And Television UHF Satellite Ltd.
- Headquarters: Bucharest

Programming
- Picture format: 1080i HDTV (downscaled to 576i for the SDTV feed)

Ownership
- Owner: RCS & RDS
- Sister channels: Digi 24; Digi Animal World; Digi Life; Digi Sport; Digi World; Digi 4K; Film Now; H!T Music Channel; Hora TV; Music Channel

History
- Launched: April 9, 2005
- Replaced: UTV
- Replaced by: The Best
- Former names: Romania Music

Links
- Website: www.utv.ro

Availability

Terrestrial
- Digital terrestrial television: Channel 10

UTV is a Romanian free-to-air music television channel located in Bucharest owned by RCS & RDS S.A.. It was launched in late 2005 under the slogan "All I want for Christmas is U". It belonged to UTI GROUP, but was later sold to RCS RDS. It is mainly broadcast in clubs and restaurants, but also has a target for 18–35 years public, broadcasting new and recent music, Romanian and foreign, mainly dance, club, house.

It was also available as U HD, with Dolby Audio, until 2014. UTV mainly broadcasts new music, while H!T music channel, another RCS RDS channel, broadcasts older music from the 1960s to the present.
