= Sorin Ovidiu Vântu =

Romanian businessman (born 1955)

Sorin Ovidiu Vântu (Romanian pronunciation: [soˈrin oˈvidju ˈvɨntu]; 23 November 1955, Bucharest) is a Romanian businessman and owner of the Realitatea-Cațavencu media company. In 2007, he was considered the 4th richest man in Romania, with an estimated net worth between 2.1 and 2.3 billion euros.

On 16 June 2009, during a TV interview on B1 TV, former president Traian Băsescu accused Vîntu of tax evasion by allegedly not paying 60 million euros worth of Value Added Tax. Vântu later denied the accusation, and sued Băsescu for libel, asking for 1 million euros in damages.

Vîntu was sentenced to two years in prison in 2005 for using some false documents to gain majority shares in the Investment and Development Bank (BID), which went bankrupt in 2002. Later the Bucharest Court of Appeals ordered by final decision the discontinuation of the trial finding that the charges passed their statute of limitations.

On 21 June 2012, he was sentenced to one year in prison following the blackmail accusation of his ex business partner, Sebastian Ghiță.

In September 2010 he was briefly arrested, being accused of having helped Nicolae Popa, the former CEO of BID.

On 21 February 2016, he was sentenced to eight years in prison for a ponzi scheme.

== See also ==
- Capital Top 300 wealthiest men in Romania
