= Capital Top 300 wealthiest men in Romania =

This is a list of Romania's richest people (Romanian: cei mai bogați români) for the year 2016. The list is published yearly by the newspaper Capital. The full list is published as a book and only the top 10 are published online.

| Rank | Name | Est. fortune (in million €) |
|---|---|---|
| 1 | Ion Țiriac | 1600-1650 |
| 2 | Dragoş şi Adrian Pavăl | 920-950 |
| 3 | Ioan Niculae | 600-700 |
| 4 | Zoltán Teszári | 500-520 |
| 5 | Iulian Dascălu | 450-460 |
| 6 | Gruia Stoica şi Vasile Didilă | 380-400 |
| 7 | Marius şi Emil Cristescu | 350-360 |
| 8 | Gabriel Popoviciu | 340-360 |
| 9 | George Becali | 280-300 |
| 10 | Radu Dimofte | 280-300 |
