= Digi Sport (Romania) =

- Country: Romania
- Headquarters: Bucharest

Ownership
- Owner: RCS & RDS
- Sister channels: Digi 24; Digi Animal World; Digi Life; Digi World; Digi 4K; Film Now; H!T Music Channel; Hora TV; Music Channel; U TV

History
- Launched: 23 July 2009; 16 years ago

Links
- Website: digisport.ro

Digi Sport is a Romanian sports television network launched on 23 July 2009, available only on the Digi TV platform. It consists of four sports channels, Digi Sport 1, Digi Sport 2, Digi Sport 3 and Digi Sport 4. On 23 November 2018 Digi 4K was launched just for main events.

== Genre ==
Digi Sport broadcasts a variety of sports competitions such as football, tennis, handball, basketball, volleyball or kickboxing. From 2011 to 2023, the network also provided live coverage of Formula 1 race weekends until the broadcasting rights were sold to Antena 1 from the 2024 season onwards.

=== Football ===
==== Liga 1 ====
Digi Sport will show 270 live Liga 1 matches from 2019 to 2024. These games are played on Friday nights, Saturday and Sunday evenings and nights and Monday nights. Before the game, at half-time and after the game all Liga 1 games have dedicated programmes including Fotbal Club and Digi Sport Special presented by Radu Naum and Valentin Moraru and with special guests like Gabi Balint, Ilie Dumitrescu, Helmut Duckadam, Florin Bratu, Claudiu Niculescu or Ionel Danciulescu.

==== La Liga ====
Since 2009 Digi Sport has the rights to broadcast every game in the competition. Digi Sport airs all 380 games of the La Liga season including El Clasico. The biggest games are preceded by the talk show named Fotbal European presented by George Dobre and with some special guests including Andrei Niculescu, Gabi Balint and Nana Falemi.

=== Kickboxing ===
==== Colosseum Tournament ====
Since 2016, Digi Sport has the rights to broadcast every event in the Colosseum Tournament and its Prometheus Fighting Promotion brand.

== Summary of sports rights ==
=== Football ===
- UEFA Champions League: 2018–2027
- UEFA Europa League: 2024–2027
- UEFA Conference League: 2024–2027
- Liga I: 2009–2027
- Liga II: 2011–2027
- Cupa României: 2012–2027
- Supercupa României: 2016–2027
- LaLiga: 2009–2026
- Serie A: 2009–2025
- Bundesliga: 2018–2025

=== Tennis ===
- WTA Tour: 2017-2026
- ATP Tour: 2024-2026

=== Motorsport ===
- MotoGP: 2020-2026

=== Handball ===
- World Men's Handball Championship: until 2025
- World Women's Handball Championship: until 2025
- European Men's Handball Championship: until 2024
- European Women's Handball Championship: until 2024
- EHF Champions League: until 2025
- EHF European League: until 2025
- EHF European Cup: until 2025
- Women's EHF Champions League: until 2025
- Women's EHF European League: until 2025
- Women's EHF European Cup: until 2025
