= Realitatea-Cațavencu =

Romanian media organization

Realitatea–Caţavencu was Romania's premium media organisation, spanning television networks, radio stations, publishing, and new media. Its portfolio of over 20 titles encompassed amongst others, Realitatea TV, Cotidianul, Academia Catavencu, Radio Guerrilla, The Money Channel, Tabu, 24-FUN. The companies were sold in 2011.

As of April 2008, Realitatea-Catavencu is the only integrated media group, organized along four major divisions (quality, business, lifestyle and new media) as well as two strategic structures: a content agency – NewsIn, and the digital signage networks - Monopoly Media and Zoom.

In October 2008, Realitatea-Catavencu initiated Code Green, thus becoming the first media group to get involved in environment related issues and policy. Cod Verde brings together our journalists and all the Romanians that feel responsible for the environment, those who can, and are willing to take charge. The campaign also includes public actions of large scope which exceed the current journalistic concerns.

== Operations ==
=== Television ===
- Realitatea TV
- The Money Channel
- Romantica (co-owned by Chello Zone)
- Telesport
- Premium movie channels: CineStar, ActionStar, ComedyStar
- Publika TV (Moldova).

=== Radio ===
- Radio Guerrilla
- Realitatea FM
- Gold FM (former Radio Total)

=== News agency ===
- NewsIn

=== In-store advertising & Digital signage ===
- Monopoly Media
- ZOOM

=== Publishing ===
- 24 Fun
- Academia Caţavencu
- Aventuri la pescuit
- Bilanţ
- Bucătăria pentru toţi
- Business Standard
- Cotidianul
- Idei în Dialog
- Investiţii şi Profit
- IQads
- J'adore
- Le Monde Diplomatique (Romanian edition)
- Money Express
- Psihologia Azi
- Superbebe
- Tabu
