= Realitatea FM =

Romanian radio station

- Romania
- Frequency: FM: 103.1 Mhz (Snagov)

Programming
- Format: News

Ownership
- Owner: Realitatea-Catavencu

History
- First air date: 2007

Links
- Website: www.radiorfm.ro

Realitatea FM or RFM is a radio station based in Bucharest. It is a talk-show/news radio station, part of Realitatea-Catavencu media group. It began on November 1, 2007. They are broadcasting on:

- Snagov 103.1 FM
