= Național 24 Plus =

- Country: Romania
- Broadcast area: National, also distributed in Moldova

Programming
- Picture format: 16:9 (576i, SDTV)

Ownership
- Owner: Centrul Național Media
- Sister channels: Național TV; Favorit TV

History
- Launched: August 30, 2004 (as N24)
- Former names: N24 (2004–2009); N24 Plus (2009–2011)

Links
- Website: www.n24plus.ro

Național 24 Plus is a Romanian free-to-air channel, owned by Centrul Național Media, which is a trust owned by Micula Brothers. The television channel was launched on 30 August 2004 as N24 under the slogan "Este principalul!" ("It's the main one!") as a news television channel. In 2005, the slogan was changed to "Știri sau nu știi" ("News or you don't know"). On 12 December 2009, it became N24 Plus, becoming thus an information and entertainment

The 2011 to 2022 and 2022-present idents of Național 24 Plus are identic with the idents of Național TV used from 2003 to 2004.

On March 2nd, 2022, it switched to 16:9.

Național 24 Plus broadcasts Indian television series, news, documentaries, music videos, children's television programs and lifestyle television programs. It is the sister channel of Național TV, a generalist television channel, also owned by Centrul Național Media.

== Programming ==
=== Indian series ===
- Kasautii Zindagii Kay
- Jamai Raja
- Sasural Simar Ka
- Saath Nibhaana Saathiya
- Uttaran

=== Other programming ===
- Știri
- Sport
- Meteo
- Un nou mod de viață
- Actul 2
- Doza de Frumusețe și Stil
- Euroferma
- Sed Lex
- Baronii
- Vouă
- Biography of America
- American Cinema
- Framework for Democracy
- Istoria petrolului din România
- Profesii, cariere
- Videoclipuri Național FM
- Nino şi Maria
- Albumul național
