= National Hajj Council (Ghana) =

Government agency of Ghana

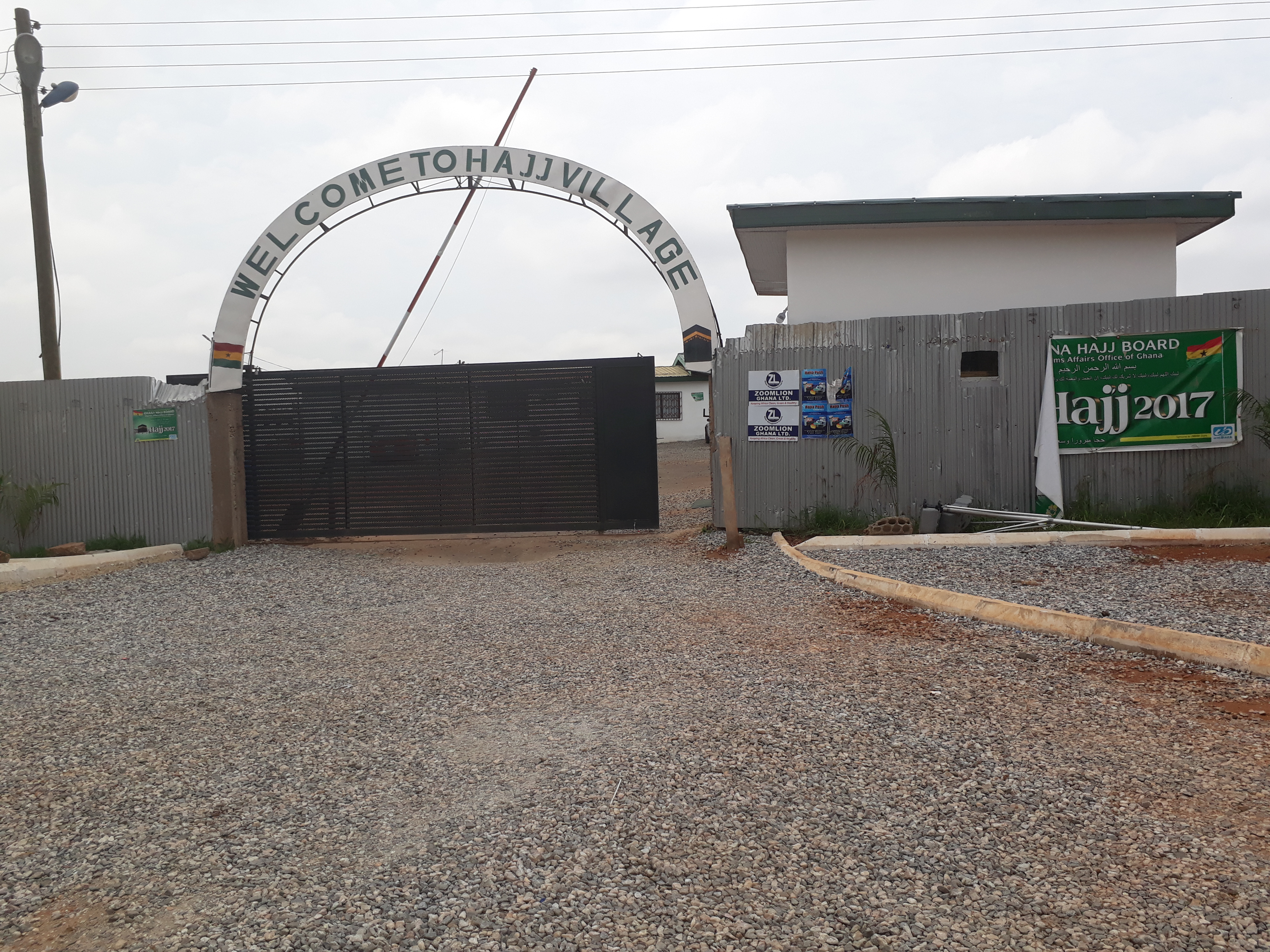
- Entrance to the Ghana Hajj Village near Accra International Airport

Agency overview
- Parent agency: Pilgrims Affairs Office of Ghana
- Website: hajj.org.gh

National Hajj Council (also National Hajj Committee or Ghana Hajj Secretariat or Ghana Hajj Board) is a division under the Pilgrims Affairs Office of Ghana's Ministry of Foreign Affairs. It was set up to oversee the annual airlifting of Ghanaian Hajj pilgrims to Saudi Arabia.

== Cost of Hajj ==
The cost of Hajj per head experience frequent fluctuations, falling in some years and rising in others mainly due to the instability of the Ghanaian cedi. When pegged against the US dollar however the unit cost kept changing depending on other factors like exchange rate, flight ticket among others

Year	Cost	
Year	(US dollar)	(Ghanaian cedi)
2026	3,300	60,000
2025	4,130	62,000
2024	6,000	75,000
2023	6,500	75,000
2022	5,000	39,000
2021	Cancelled due to Covid-19	Cancelled due to Covid-19
2020	Cancelled due to Covid-19	Cancelled due to Covid-19
2019	3,750	19,500
2018	3,450	15,000
2017	3,450	15,000
2016	3,500	11, 900
2015	3,450	11,900
2014	3,450	12,000
2013	3,450	6,800

== Leadership ==
Leadership of the National Hajj Council is appointed by President of Ghana in consultation with the Chief Imam of Ghana. Over the years different government administrations have reorganized leadership structure of the Hajj facilitation body under various names.

=== 2017 reconstitution ===
Akuffo-Addo government in 2017 reconstituted the erstwhile Hajj Committee into three major units supervised by an eleven-member board.^{Note 1} The three units are Medical, Communications and an Information Technology directorate; the latter tasked with the responsibility to build and deploy a technology infrastructure to manage all Hajj operations.

=== Chronology of leaders ===
Office(s)	Officeholder	Term start	Term end
Board Chairman	Alhaji Abdul Rauf Ibrahim Tanko	November 2025	
Board Chairman	Ben Abdallah Banda	February 2023	October 2025
Board Chairman	Ibrahim Cudjoe Quaye	February 2017	January 2023
Board Chairman	Abdul Rauf Ibrahim Tanko	January 2013	January 2016
Board Chairman	Alhassan Bene	2009	2012

== Notes ==
1.^Note 1 The following persons support leadership of the 2017 Hajj team: Sadique (PhD) - adviser to board chairman, and Gariba Malik - Passport issues.
