= Zapp Mobile =

Zapp
- Company type: Private
- Industry: Mobile telecommunications
- Founded: April 1993 as Telefonica Romania
- Defunct: 1 December 2017
- Fate: Acquired by OTE, and slowly dissolved from 2011 to 2018
- Headquarters: Baloteşti, Ilfov County, Romania
- Key people: Chris Bataillard, CEO
- Website: www.zapp.ro

Zapp Mobile was the first CDMA 450 MHz mobile phone operator in Romania, part of Telekom Romania Mobile (now Vodafone Romania and DIGI Romania). In 2006 Zapp got a UMTS 2100 MHz license.

Zapp Mobile was a company of Telemobil S.A. România, which was a spin-off of Telefónica Romania, the first Romanian mobile service provider (now defunct). Telefónica Romania acquired a NMT license on 22 March 1992 and the mobile operator called "Telemobil" went live in April 1993. On 30 June 2009 Zapp Mobile was acquired by OTE and it is in the process of integration in OTE's Romanian mobile unit Cosmote Romania.

As of 24 March 2013 Zapp CDMA licence expired and the CDMA 450 network was closed down.

== Radio Frequency Summary ==
The following is a list of known frequencies Zapp Mobile employed in Romania:

Frequencies used on the Zapp Mobile Network
MCC	MNC	Frequency	Band number	Protocol	Class	Notes
226	06	900 MHz	8	UMTS/HSPA/HSPA+ (21.6 Mbit/s)/(5.76 Mbit/s)	3G	Not operational - shut down as of end of March 2023
226	06	2100 MHz	1	UMTS/HSPA/HSPA+/DC-HSPA+ (43.2 Mbit/s)/(5.76 Mbit/s)	3G	Not operational - shut down as of end of March 2023

== See also ==
- List of mobile network operators
- Communications media in Romania
