= Ziarul Financiar =

Romanian newspaper

- Editor: Sorin Pislaru
- Categories: Business Daily
- Publisher: PubliMedia International
- Country: Romania
- Language: Romanian
- Website: www.zf.ro
- ISSN: 1454-2641
- OCLC: 780376884

Ziarul Financiar is a daily financial newspaper published in Bucharest, Romania. Aside from business information, it features sections focusing on careers and properties, as well as a special Sunday newspaper. Ziarul Financiar also publishes Transylvanian, Proprietăți, Ziarul de Duminică, Profesii, După Afaceri, supplements and a monthly magazine, go4it!, which is provided freely to the newspaper's subscribers.

== History ==
In April 2003, Ziarul Financiar has launched a press package that together with ZF also contains its cultural supplement, the Sunday Newspaper (Romanian: Ziarul de Duminică), the weekend After Business (După Afaceri) supplement and the Discovery magazine (Descoperă).

Since 2004, Ziarul Financiar has launched a series of Yearbooks - The Top of the Most Valuable Companies of Romania, The Top Players of the Economy, Top Transactions, Who's Who in Business and The Top 1,000 Business people in Romania.

Ziarul Financiar also publishes the publication "Business Directory of Romania", which was launched in 2006. Currently (October 2019), Ziarul Financiar is edited by Mediafax Group and is coordinated by Cristian Hostiuc, Editorial Director, and Sorin Pâslaru, Editor-in-Chief.

== Notable contributors ==
- Silviu Brucan
- Daniel Dăianu
- Ovidiu Pecican
- Alex Mihai Stoenescu
