= Digi24 =

Romanian television news channel

- Country: Romania
- Headquarters: Bucharest

Programming
- Picture format: 576i (16:9, SDTV) 1080i (16:9, HDTV)

Ownership
- Owner: RCS&RDS
- Sister channels: Digi Animal World; Digi Life; Digi Sport; Digi World; Digi 4K; Film Now; H!T Music Channel; Hora TV; Music Channel; U TV

History
- Launched: 10 December 2010 (relaunched 1 March 2012)
- Former names: 10 TV

Links
- Website: www.digi24.ro

Availability

Streaming media
- Digi24 Live

Digi24, often known as Digi 24 (Romanian pronunciation: [ˈdidʒi ˌdowəˈzetʃʲ ʃi ˈpatru]), is a 24-hour Romanian news television channel which was launched on 1 March 2012 by Digi TV.

== History ==
10 TV, a generalist television channel, was launched on 10 December 2010 by RCS&RDS. 10 TV hosted Nașul TV show, which Radu Moraru had previously anchored for ten years on B1 TV. 10 TV was subsequently re-launched with a brand new name. On 1 March 2012, 10 TV was rebranded as Digi24 by branding agency Kemistry and hitherto known as such. It also used to have regional channels like Digi 24 Timișoara, Digi 24 Galați, Digi 24 Constanța, Digi 24 Brașov, Digi 24 Oradea and more.
