= ProSport =

Romanian sports news outlet

- Type: Online newspaper
- Owner: GÂNDUL MEDIA NETWORK SRL
- Editor: Andrei Trifan
- Founded: 2 July 1997
- Ceased publication: 6 December 2013
- Headquarters: Fabrica de Glucoză, nr. 21, parter, sector 2, București
- City: Bucharest
- Country: Romania
- Website: www.prosport.ro

ProSport was a daily Romanian newspaper. It was owned by the PubliMedia International. It was launched in July 1997 by the Media Pro, the biggest media trust in Eastern Europe.

== Overview ==
In 2000, the newspaper had average sales of around 79,910 copies, dropping to 43,000 copies in 2009, and losing the lead in sports newspapers.

Although a wide range of sports was covered in the newspaper, football was given by far most of the coverage. The newspaper was divided into a variety of different sections such as: national football, international football, sports and special. It usually included 24 pages which use a 6-column format, but also printed editions of 32 pages devoted to some specific events.

In 2019 Gândul Media Network company took over the ProSport brand. Now, the sports website is part of ARCMEDIA and it is one of the most important and influential in Romania, having a trustworthy content.
