= Nicolae Popa (businessman) =

Romanian criminal (born 1965)

- Born: c. 1965 (age 60–61); Romania
- Occupation: Businessman
- Known for: Fraud and embezzlement related to a Ponzi scheme known as the Fondul Național de Investiții (FNI)
- Criminal charges: Fraud and embezzlement
- Criminal penalty: 15 years in prison

Nicolae Popa (born c. 1965) is a Romanian criminal. In 2006 he was sentenced in absentia to 15 years in jail for fraud and embezzlement related to the 2000 collapse of the Fondul Național de Investiții (FNI) Ponzi scheme, with an estimated prejudice of 1.2 million euros spread between some 130,000 investors.

The sentence was final; all appeals were exhausted. Popa was also sentenced to 12 years in jail for a different affair, Fondul Național de Acumulare (FNA), but this decision may still be appealed. On the run since 2002, Popa was apprehended in December 2009 in Jakarta, Indonesia. Sorin Ovidiu Vântu, a high-profile businessman and owner of several newspapers and television stations, declared after Popa's apprehension that he still considers Popa a friend and that the sentences are "a giant manipulation".

In the final televised debate of the 2009 presidential elections, Popa's arrest was used as political ammunition by the incumbent president Traian Băsescu against runoff rival Mircea Geoană, after the latter met with Vântu the night before the debate just after news of Popa's apprehension broke out.

At his trial in Giurgiu in 2014, Popa was sentenced to 10 years and 4 months in prison; he was liberated in 2017, after serving 3 years and 2 months.
