= PubliMedia International =

Newspaper and magazine publishing company

PubliMedia International, the publishing company of biggest's media trust in Eastern Europe, Media Pro, is a newspaper and magazine publishing company operating in Romania.

In July 2010, it was reported that PubliMedia and related companies were setting up Mediafax Group, a new publishing and electronic media company, which would bring together a number of companies under common ownership.

PubliMedia publishes nine newspapers (two national dailies and seven local newspapers) and 12 magazines.

The firm operates in several market segments:

- Business press: with three titles: Ziarul Financiar (a business daily), BUSINESS Magazin (the only business weekly magazine in Romania), Gandul (quality press) and Target (a monthly business magazine focused on success stories and lifestyle)
- Guides: ProTV Magazin (television listings)
- Women's magazines: Acasa Magazin, with Ce se intampla, doctore? — a health and life style magazine, launched in October 2005 and with The ONE, a glamour-glossy magazine
- Special interest magazines: with three titles ProMotor (a car magazine), DESCOPERA (a knowledge magazine), Go4it! (a gadget magazine)
- Men's magazines: Romanian editions of Playboy and Maxim
- Local newspapers network: with 7 titles, in the main cities of Romania

The firm also operates several websites in Romania in the same segments as its printed publications.

- Business: www.zf.ro, www.businessmagazin.ro, www.targetonline.ro
- Entertainment: www.protvmagazin.ro, www.playboyromania.ro, www.maxim.ro
- Women magazines: www.csid.ro, www.acasamagazin.ro, www.onemagazine.ro
- Special interest: www.descopera.ro, www.go4it.ro,
- Auto: www.promotor.ro
- Regional: www.ziarelocale.ro
