= UPC Romania =

Former Romanian cable company

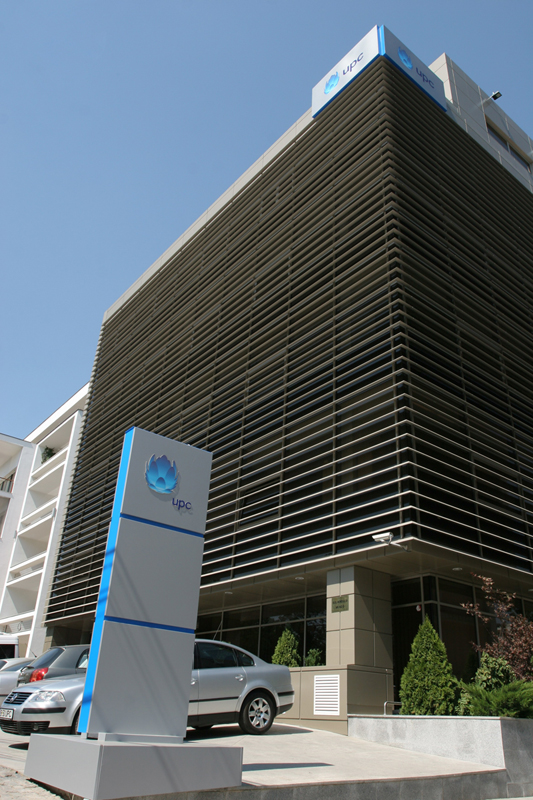
- Type: Subsidiary
- Industry: Telecommunications
- Founded: October 14, 1999; 26 years ago
- Defunct: March 31, 2020
- Fate: Acquired by Vodafone Romania on 31st of July 2019; rebranded as Vodafone
- Successor: Vodafone Romania
- Headquarters: Bucharest, Romania
- Key people: Robert Redeleanu (CEO)
- Products: Cable television Broadband Internet; Telephony
- Revenue: $173.3 million
- Owner: Liberty Global
- Number of employees: 1100 (2019)
- Parent: Vodafone Romania
- Website: www.vodafone.ro

UPC Romania was a telecommunications company in Romania, which provided cable television, broadband internet and fixed telephony to approximately 1 million customers. On July 31, 2019, Vodafone acquired the company and it was merged into Vodafone Romania on 31 March 2020.

== History ==
United International Holdings (UIH) (now Liberty Global) has invested in Romania since 1993, by acquiring shares in several local cable companies in the country.

UPC Romania was established in October 1999. In 2000 it had 115,000 subscribers. In early 2003, UPC absorbed local cable television companies in Bucharest, Botoșani, Cluj-Napoca, Focșani, Ploiești and Sfântu Gheorghe. At the beginning of 2005, UPC had 333,000 subscribers in 40 cities.

In 2005, Liberty Global (then UGC Europe) bought Astral Telecom for $420 million and became major provider with 1.31 million customers.

On May 19, 2005, UPC bought 50% of the shares of Focus Sat, before launching the service on July 5, 2005. In April 2006, it took over the entire control of the company after buying the remaining 50% of the shares from the founders.

In December 2018 the company's satellite TV division Focus Sat was sold to M7 Group. This sale was processed after necessary permissions, in spring 2019.

Its last TV business was sold to Vodafone in 2019.
