= Capital (Romanian magazine) =

Romanian weekly magazine

The official logo of the Romanian financial and economic weekly magazine Capital

Capital (Capital in Romanian) is a Romanian financial and economic weekly magazine published in Bucharest.

Capital offers analyses, investigations and trend predictions accompanied by graphics, tables and photos to all with an interest in economics. Capital offers its readers guidance in their entrepreneurial initiatives, going beyond the news in order to discover the causes that generate the events.

Capital was the first publication launched by Ringier in Romania. It was started in 1990. Capital was re-launched in 2000 and 2004 in a new and modern graphic concept. Capital has launched the Top 300 Richest Romanians. Other two tops were added in the following years: Top 100 Successful Women and in 2005 Top 100 Companies to Work for.

Regular sections:

- Actuality;
- Business;
- Investments;
- Consultancy;

Editorial Supplements:

Capital issues the following supplements:

- Gadget
- European Funds
- Banking
- Buildings&Real Estate
- Foreign Investments
- Financial services

Brand extensions: The magazine publishes in Romania the Top Capital Collection:

- Top 300 Richest Romanian People
- Top 100 Most Successful Women
- Top 100 Companies to Work for
- Top 120 Best Franchises in Romania

TV Shows:

- Capital TV on Kanal D.

Capital TV sections:

- Behind the economy curtains
- Capital expert
- People on top
- Trends

== See also ==
- List of magazines in Romania
