= Radio Gold FM =

Radio station in Bucharest, Romania

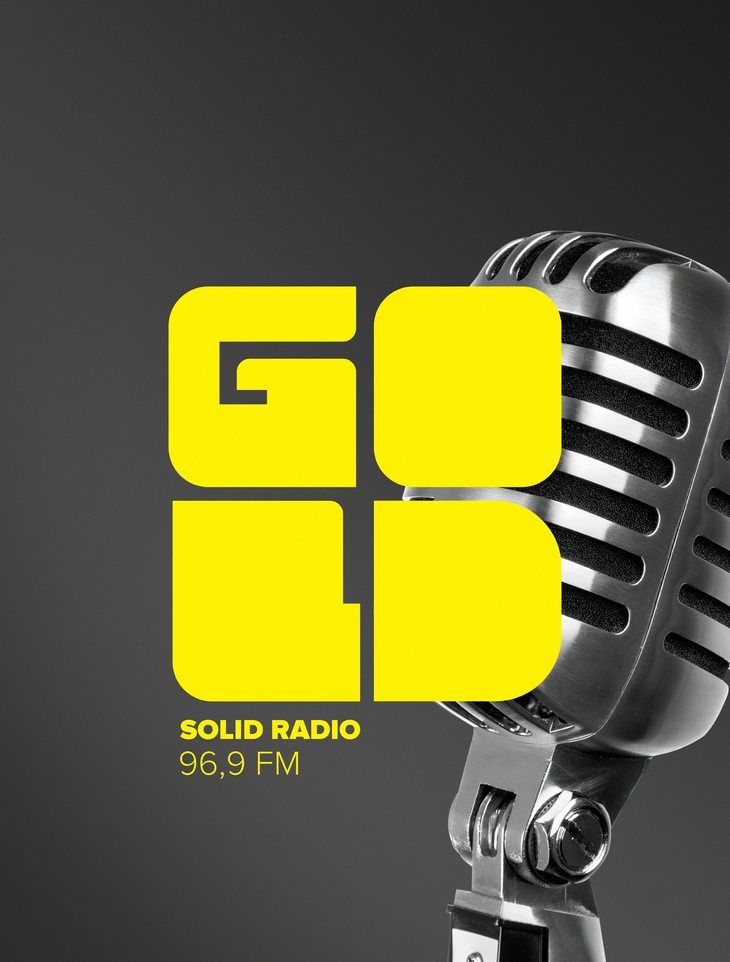

Radio GOLD FM (Formerly Radio Total) is an FM radio station broadcasting from Bucharest, Romania. It was launched on 27 October 2008 on 96.9 MHz and is one of the most popular radio stations in Romania.

== History ==
The station initially focused on the greatest hits of the 1960's, 1970's, and 1980's. Its slogan was "Gold FM. The greatest hits radio."

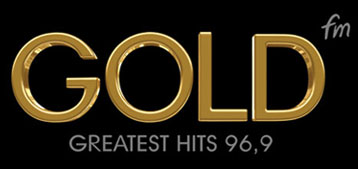

At the end of 2014, the station transitioned to adult contemporary, playing a selection of hits from the last 25 years to target a younger audience. The re-branding meant new jingles, new logo, and a new slogan, "Gold FM. Solid radio." The result of this change was seen in the radio's audience data in 2015, with the station managing to pull in more than double its initial reach (from under 25000 listeners in 2014 to approx. 54000 in the fall of 2015). Starting in May 2020, the station started to play a selection of oldies once again, combined with some alternative new wave music.
