= Vodafone Romania =

Romanian mobile phone network operator

Vodafone Romania S.A.

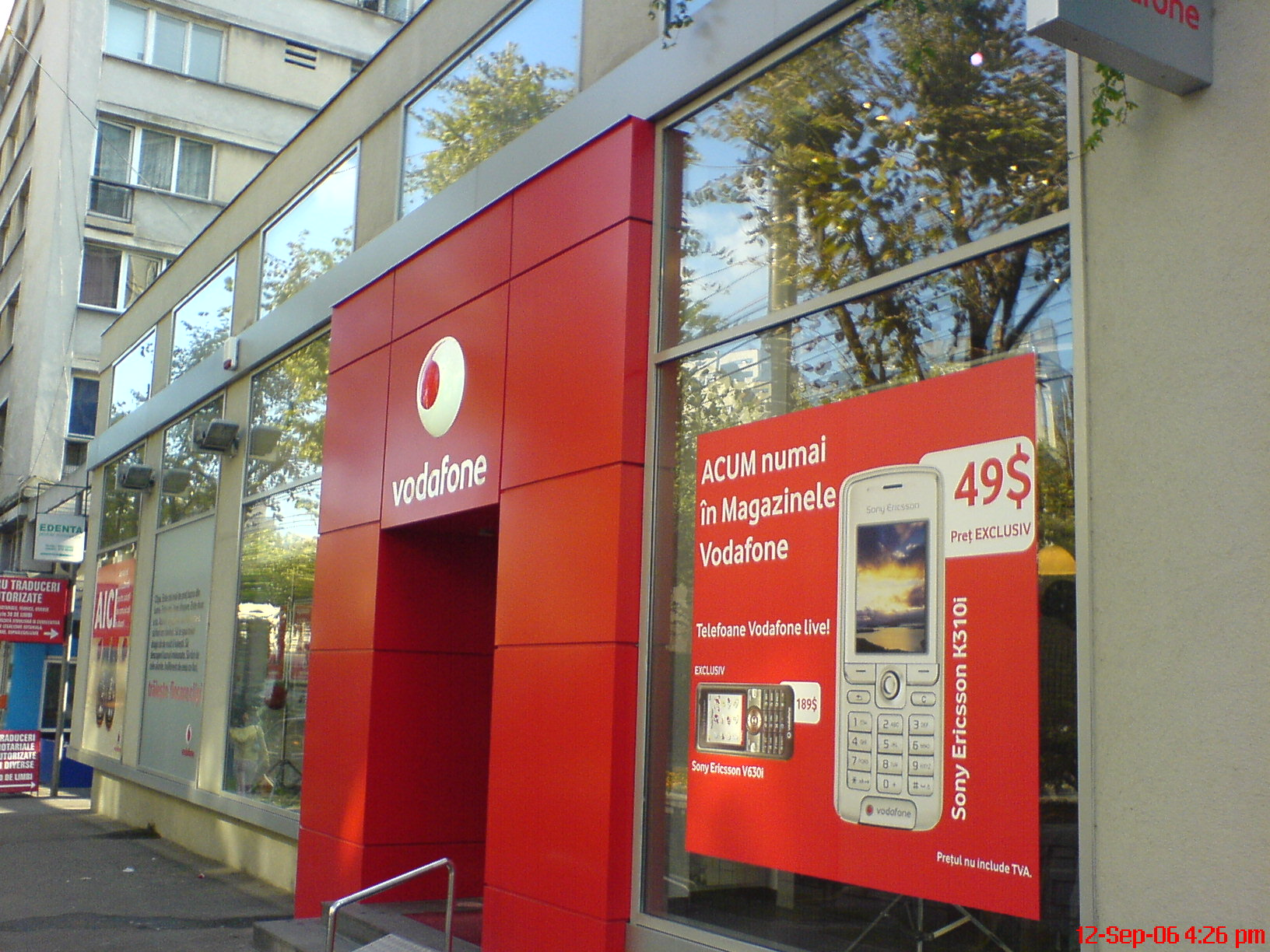
- Formerly: Connex; Connex-Vodafone; Telekom Romania Mobile
- Type: Subsidiary
- Industry: Mobile; Telecommunications
- Founded: 1997; 29 years ago (as Connex GSM)
- Headquarters: Bucharest, Romania
- Key people: Nedim Baytorun (CEO)
- Revenue: 818,000,000 euro (2018)
- Net income: 38,100,000 euro (2018)
- Number of employees: 2,340 (2018)
- Parent: Vodafone Group Plc
- Website: www.vodafone.ro

Vodafone Romania S.A. is a Romanian telecommunications operator owned by Vodafone Group Plc. It launched in April 1997 as the first GSM network in Romania.

Before acquisition by Vodafone Group Plc, it was known as Connex, after which it was rebranded Connex-Vodafone and in April 2006, the Connex name was dropped, the operator being simply known as Vodafone Romania, aligning itself with the global Vodafone brand.

Vodafone Romania is a wholly owned subsidiary of Vodafone Group Plc, and is the seventh-largest Vodafone subsidiary in the world by number of subscribers. Vodafone became the majority stakeholder after it brought 79% of Mobifon's shares from Canadian company Telesystems International Wireless, which had been the previous majority shareholder. Furthermore, it recently acquired 5% of Mobifon's shares from Canadian Entrepreneur Elani Grobler.

The operator is the main competitor of Orange for the 22.8 million active mobile telephony users in Romania. Connex, the ancestor of Vodafone Romania, held the largest number of subscribers, except the year 2000, until September 2004, when Orange edged ahead.

The motto of Vodafone is Trăiește fiecare clipă (rendered in English by the company as Make the most of now, a more accurate translation would be "Live every moment"). Previous mottos were: Tu faci viitorul (You create the future) and Viitorul sună bine (The future sounds good).

== Details ==
Subscriber numbers issued in Romania by Vodafone begin with the three-digit prefixes 072, 073 and 079, followed by a unique seven-digit combination. However, not all such numbers necessarily belong to Vodafone subscribers because of the number portability for mobile telephony networks.

In November 2022, the latest auction for the 5G frequencies was completed. The frequencies that Vodafone gained are as follows:

- 10 blocks of 10 MHz on the frequency zone of 3400-3800 MHz
- 2 blocks of 5 MHz on the frequency zone of 700 MHz

Vodafone was the second highest bidder for the frequencies spending up to 123 million euros. The 5G network became accessible Vodafone Romania subscribers in May 2019.

== Brands of Vodafone ==
Vodafone headquarters in Bucharest, Romania

Vodafone Romania (and Connex before it) used numerous others brands. They include:

- Xnet – an internet service provider, offering free unlimited dial-up for Connex mobile phone subscribers between 2000 and 2003. The brand is no longer used.
- myX – Romania's first mobile portal. Also used by the company for a short-lived venture in the fashion industry. The portal has been relabeled as Vodafone Live.
- myBanking – Mobile Banking service
- myDomain – domain name service
- homemade.ro – video sharing website

== History ==
- 1998: SMS services introduced
- 1999: Xnet Internet service introduced; High Speed Circuit Switched Data (HSCSD) technology introduced; mobile phones running on Connex donated to ambulance service of Oradea (first Romanian company to do so)
- 2000: WAP mobile Internet services launched
- 2001: myX, Romania's first mobile portal launched; SMS services such as dating, ringtones and logos are introduced; GPRS service launched

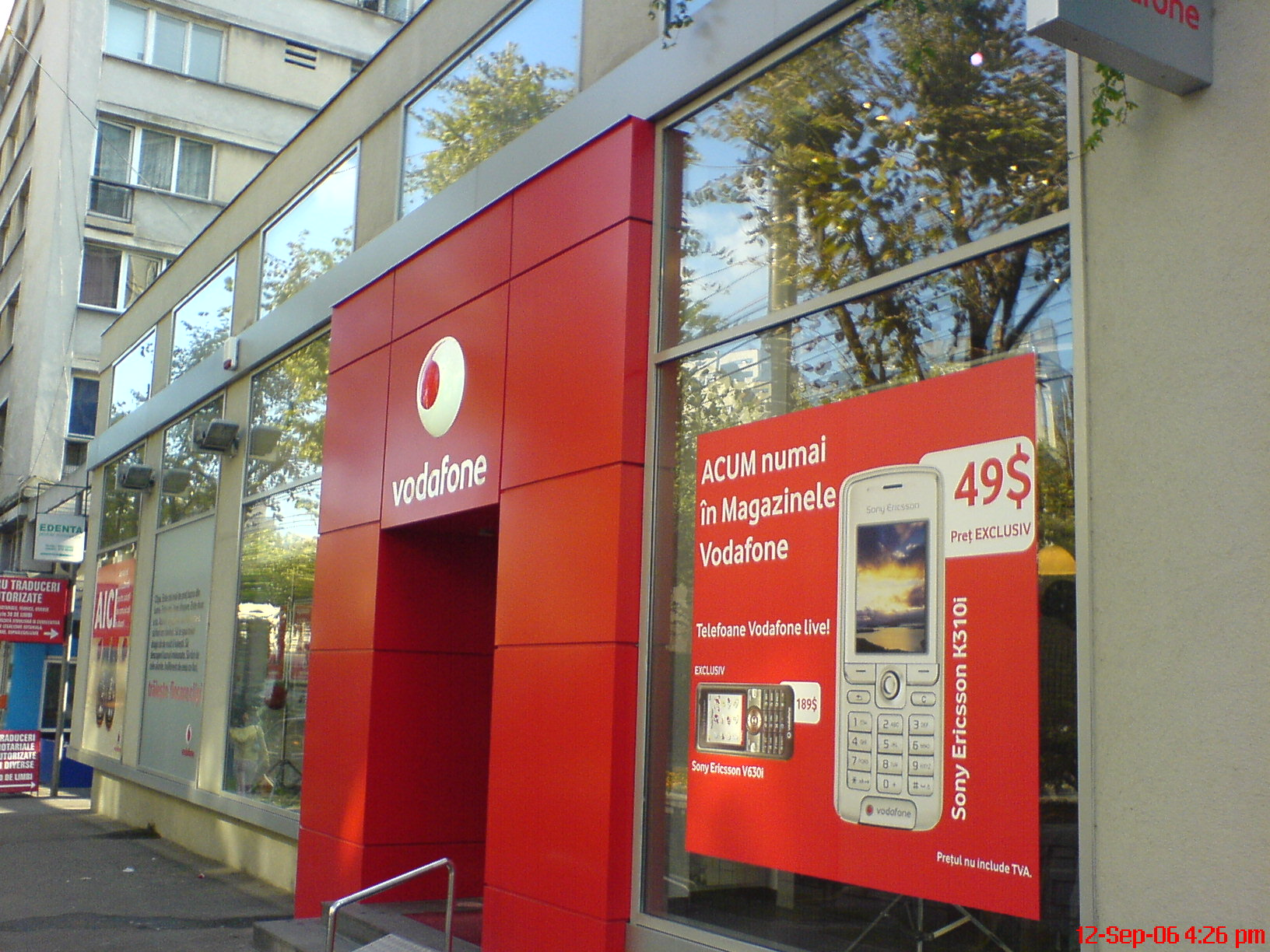
A former "Connex Center" rebranded as Vodafone in Iaşi, Romania.

- 2002: GPRS prepaid introduced; first company in Europe to introduce World Wide Number (WWN) facilities; mobile banking introduced in cooperation with Banca Comerciala Romana (BCR).
- 2003: myBanking introduced – a service in collaboration with Raiffeisen Bank, for customers to pay Connex bills and do banking automatically
- 2003: Connex Meeting Call introduced.
- 2005: 3G services based on W-CDMA introduced, giving way to video telephony and broadband internet via mobile phone.
- 2005: In partnership with RIM, Connex launches the second BlackBerry service in Romania.
- 2005: Liliana Solomon is named CEO of Connex.
- 1 November 2005: The name of the operator is changed to Connex-Vodafone.
- 27 April 2006: The name of the operator is changed to Vodafone Romania.
- 2018: Vodafone acquires Liberty Global's Romanian operations, UPC Romania.

=== Radio frequency summary ===
The following is a list of known frequencies which Vodafone employs in Romania:

Frequencies used on the Vodafone Romania Network
MCC	MNC	Frequency	Band number	Protocol (Downlink/Uplink speed)	Class	Notes
226	01	900 MHz	8	GSM/GPRS/EDGE	2G	
226	01	1800 MHz	3	GSM/GPRS/EDGE	2G	
226	01	900 MHz	8	UMTS/HSPA/HSPA+ (21.6 Mbit/s/5.76 Mbit/s)	3G	
226	01	2100 MHz	1	UMTS/HSPA/HSPA+/DC-HSDPA (43.2 Mbit/s/5.76 Mbit/s)	3G	
226	01	800 MHz	20	LTE (75 Mbit/s/37.5 Mbit/s)	4G	Downlink speeds can be up to 225Mbit/s through CA_3A_20A
226	01	1800 MHz	3	LTE (150 Mbit/s/50 Mbit/s)	4G	Downlink speeds can be up to 225Mbit/s through CA_3A_20A
226	01	2100 MHz	1	LTE (75 Mbit/s/37.5 Mbit/s)	4G	

== See also ==
- List of mobile network operators
- Communications media in Romania
