= Radio Guerrilla =

Romanian FM radio station

- Type: Radio network
- Country: Romania
- Availability: National
- Launch date: 29 November 2004
- Official website: https://www.guerrillaradio.ro/

Radio Guerrilla is a Romanian FM radio station broadcasting from Bucharest, Romania. The station's target audience is young middle-class people between the ages of 25 and 34 (48.8% of its listeners have tertiary studies and 66.7% are between 20 and 39 years of age). Despite launching only in 2004, it is currently one of the most popular stations in Romania, with a market share of 8.7%.

Aside from FM radio, its broadcasts are also available through the Internet, via streaming. Its slogan is "Eliberadio" (a portmanteau of "eliberare", literally liberation, and "radio"). The station is known for its socially liberal viewpoint.
