= Orange Romania =

Romanian telecommunications company

Orange România
- Type: Subsidiary
- Industry: Telecommunications
- Founded: 1997; 29 years ago (as Mobilrom)
- Headquarters: Bucharest, Romania
- Key people: Julien Ducarroz (CEO)
- Revenue: ▼€ 913 million (2012)
- Net income: 41,200,000 (2018)
- Number of employees: 2,366 (2018)
- Parent: Orange S.A.
- Website: www.orange.ro

Former logo of Dialog

Orange România is a broadband Internet service provider and mobile provider in Romania. It is Romania's largest GSM network operator which is majority owned by Orange S.A..

Between 1997 and April 2002, the company, majority-owned by France Télécom, was named Mobil Rom, and operated under two brand names : Dialog (for monthly subscription plans, in Romanian means "dialogue") and Alo (for prepaid services). In April 2002, after France Télécom re-branded its services globally under the brand Orange, it became Orange Romania to comply with the group's global strategy. As of December 2012, Orange Romania had 10.3 million mobile subscribers.. However, following the introduction of DIGI as a new mobile operator in 2007, Orange is now credited with around 9.2 million mobile subscribers in 2025.

Orange is in head-to-head competition with Vodafone Romania and the most recent DIGI for one of the most dynamic mobile telephony markets in south eastern Europe. Currently the mobile penetration is at about 120% (active users only). Vodafone (formerly Connex) was leading in terms of number of subscribers until September 2004, when Orange overtook them to become the leading mobile telephony operator, with a market share of almost 35% of the total market.

In September 2021, Orange Romania, through a subsidiary, acquired 54% of the fixed-network operator Telekom Romania (fixed) (formerly incumbent and state-owned Romtelecom) from OTE Group. On June 1, 2024, Orange Romania and its subsidiary merged, leading to a final ownership structure of Orange SA at 80% and the Romanian State at 20%. The move is intended to accelerate the delivery of fixed-mobile converged services, unifying networks, customer databases, and IT systems.

In October 2025, Vodafone Romania acquired Telekom Romania Mobile from OTE Group - some assets of the latter being sold to DIGI in the process - reducing the number of mobile network operators in Romania from 4 to 3 (Orange Romania, Vodafone Romania, and DIGI).

These consolidations, though establishing a more competitive landscape in Romania, aim to reinforce Orange Romania as the leading global telecommunications network operator in Romania.

Orange România also controls 4% of the Moldovan operator Orange Moldova.

== YOXO ==
In 2020 Orange Romania launches its branch YOXO Romania as a virtual mobile network.

== Radio frequency summary ==
The following is a list of known frequencies which Orange uses in Romania:

Frequencies used on the Orange Romania Network
| MCC | MNC | Frequency | Band number | Protocol (Downlink/Uplink speed) | Class | Notes |
|---|---|---|---|---|---|---|
| 226 | 10 | 900 MHz | 8 | GSM/GPRS/EDGE | 2G | |
| 226 | 10 | 900 MHz | 8 | UMTS/HSPA/HSPA+ (21.6 Mbit/s/5.76 Mbit/s) | 3G | 3G Phase-out 2025 |
| 226 | 10 | 2100 MHz | 1 | UMTS/HSPA/HSPA+/DC-HSDPA (43.2 Mbit/s/5.76 Mbit/s) | 3G | 3G Phase-out 2025 |
| 226 | 10 | 1800 MHz | B3 | LTE (142 Mbit/s/47.5 Mbit/s) | 4G | Downlink speeds can be up to 355.6 Mbit/s through CA_3A_7A_20A |
| 226 | 10 | 2600 MHz | B7 | LTE (992 Mbit/s/470.5 Mbit/s) | 4G | Downlink speeds can be up to 355.6 Mbit/s through CA_3A_7A_20A |
| 226 | 10 | 800 MHz | B20 | LTE (71.2 Mbit/s/25 Mbit/s) | 4G | Downlink speeds can be up to 500Mbit/s through CA_3A_7A_20A |
| 226 | 10 | 700 MHz | B28 | LTE (71.2 Mbit/s/25 Mbit/s) | 4G | Downlink speeds can be up to 150Mbit/s |
| 226 | 10 | 1500 MHz | B32 | LTE | 4G | Limited network development (2024–03) |
| 226 | 10 | 1800 MHz | n3 | 5G NSA | 5G | |
| 226 | 10 | 2600 MHz | n7 | 5G NSA | 5G | |
| 226 | 10 | 800 MHz | n20 | 5G NSA | 5G | |
| 226 | 10 | 700 MHz | n28 | 5G NSA | 5G | |
| 226 | 10 | 3500 MHz | n78 | 5G NSA | 5G | |

An Orange Shop in Iaşi- a retail shop for Orange services and mobile phones

== See also ==
- List of mobile network operators
- Communications media in Romania
