= Digi Communications =

Multinational telecommunications company

Digi Communications N.V.
- Type: Public
- Traded as: BVB: DIGI
- ISIN: NL0012294474
- Industry: Telecommunications
- Predecessor: TVS Holding Brasov (1992); Kappa (1993)
- Founded: November 30, 1992; 33 years ago
- Headquarters: Bucharest, Romania
- Area served: Romania; Spain; Italy; Belgium; Portugal; United Kingdom
- Key people: Zoltán Teszári (Chairman); Serghei Bulgac (CEO)
- Products: Fixed telephony; Mobile telephony; Broadband; Internet television; IoT
- Revenue: ▲$ 5.51 billion (2026)
- Number of employees: 10 177 (2023)
- ASN: 8708
- Website: digi-communications.ro

Digi Communications N.V. is a Romanian multinational telecommunications company and mobile network operator specializing in integrated services including cable and satellite television, fixed and mobile telephony, and broadband internet, operating primarily in Romania, Hungary, Spain, and Italy.

Founded in 1992 in Romania by a group of individuals including Zoltán Teszári through the establishment of TVS Holding Brașov for cable TV infrastructure, the company expanded to Hungary in 1998 and pursued international growth, including entry into Spain in 2018 and an initial public offering on the Bucharest Stock Exchange in 2017. Digi Communications has achieved market leadership in its core segments based on revenue-generating units, with over 90% of its networks in Romania and Hungary utilizing fiber optics, and it launched commercial 5G services in Romania in 2019, while continuing expansions into markets such as Portugal and Belgium.

== History ==
=== First cable networks ===
In 1992 TVS Holding Brasov was developed by Zoltán Teszári, Ioan Bendei and other businessmen. The company offered cable television services in Brașov and Timișoara. In 1993, Zoltán Teszári co-founded Kappa cable company in Bucharest. In 1996, the shareholders decided to divide the Kappa network into two equal parts. Half owned by Zoltán Teszári merged with Analog CATV SA cable company in Bucharest. The other half was bought in 2000 by Astral Telecom, which in 2005 was merged with UPC Romania (now Vodafone Romania). This separation of the company led to the division of the areas in Bucharest between the two companies for 10 years.

=== Development ===
In 1997, the company changed its name to Romania Cable Systems S.A. (RCS). Same year it is established Romania Data Systems S.A. (RDS) which offers internet services. Among the investors in the company from the beginning until the listing on the stock exchange were Carpathian Cable Investments S.a.R.L. from 1998 and Celest Limited from 1999.

The company entered Hungary in November 1998 after buying 15 small and medium cable companies in Budapest and 3 other cities. Between December 1999 and January 2000, the first cable networks were acquired in Slovakia, where Slovakia Cable Systems (SCS) was 95% owned by RCS.

In April 2000, the project to build a 4,200 km national fiber optic network was initiated. In 2003, after the liberalization of the market, the fixed telephony service was launched in Romania. Digi TV satellite television platform was first launched in Romania in December 2004, followed by launches in Hungary in February 2006, in the Czech Republic and Slovakia in August 2006 and in Croatia and Serbia in December 2006.

=== 2005-2014 ===
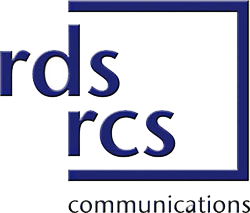
RCS & RDS logo (2005–2009)

Punct RCS & RDS logo used on different stores

RCS and RDS merged to form RCS & RDS S.A. on 26 April 2005. The company focused on rapid development both organically and through acquisitions. The C-Zone network was acquired in 2006, entering certain areas in Bucharest that were not covered due to zone exclusivity. In these areas RCS & RDS kept the brand until 2009.

Digi Slovakia, including the Digi Sport television channels in Slovakia and the Czech Republic, were sold to Slovak Telekom in 2013. Also, satellite television subsidiary in the Czech Republic was sold to Lama Energy in March 2015, which continued to use the Digi brand for other acquired internet and IPTV provider until 1 April 2020. The subsidiary in Croatia was sold to A1 Telekom Austria's Vipnet (now A1 Croatia).

=== Mobile development ===
In 2014, the mobile phone service was relaunched, followed by the launch of 4G service in 2015. Satellite television subsidiary in Serbia was sold to Kopernikus Technology, which in turn was sold to Telekom Srbija (mts) in 2018. In 2017, Digi bought the Invitel cable company in Hungary. After initially receiving approval in May 2018, it was revoked in November 2018, due to finding non-competitive issues in certain areas. These have been resolved and the transaction was completed in March 2020. In 2021, the whole Hungarian division (including Invitel) was bought by 4iG Nyrt. In 2025 the company was merged with Vodafone (also owned by 4iG Nyrt.) and became One.

the logo of Digi Punct used on different stores

== Corporate structure ==
Cable Communications Systems NV was established in the Netherlands in 2000 and is the parent company of RCS & RDS SA, the Romanian company founded in 1994 by Zoltán Teszári. It was renamed Digi Communications NV in 2017 when was listed.

== Services ==
=== Broadband internet ===
Digi implemented FTTB technology on almost the entire network in Romania and Hungary in 2006. Then followed the implementation of GPON in 2008, covering the houses as well. In 2013 started replacing FTTB with FTTH. They started the business in Spain in 2008. In 2018 Digi started offering internet services through FTTH in Spain. As of first half of 2023, it counts for 5.7 millions of clients.

=== Mobile telephony ===
The company launched Digi Mobil in Romania in December 2007 which offered mobile telephony limited to 3G service only at the time. In 2014, the mobile phone service was relaunched, followed by the launch of 4G service on band 38 in 2015 and on band 1 in 2018. After winning a mobile operator license in 2014 and numerous delays, the company launched mobile services in Hungary in 2019.

In Spain, due to the large number of Romanian residents, MVNO mobile telephony services were launched through Movistar in 2008. Initially, the company attracted Romanians because it offered cheap calls with Romanian networks. Vodafone Spain reacted after 1 year when it started losing customers by offering free calls with Vodafone Romania. This was followed by offers for Latin Americans. Then the company started offering internet at a low price, attracting Spanish customers. Digi became the second MVNO operator by number of customers.

Following the model in Spain, in 2010 Digi Mobil was launched as MVNO in Italy through TIM, but it was not as successful despite the fact that in Italy is a larger number of Romanians. Vodafone Italia began to offer free calls with Vodafone Romania and fixed networks before the launch of Digi Mobil.

=== Cable television ===
The company offers all channels in one package except premium channels.

=== Television channels ===
In July 2009, Digi launched the Digi Sport channels in Romania and Hungary. Then followed the Digi Sport channels in Slovakia and the Czech Republic in August 2010, which have been operated separately since 2013 following the takeover of Digi Slovakia by Slovak Telekom.

In the summer of 2010, it acquired 50% of Music Channel, which launched Hit Music Channel in January 2012. The company launched a generalist channel in December 2010, but due to the low audience it was closed. The premium movie channel Digi Film (now Film Now) was launched on 1 February 2011. In 2011, Digi acquired the UTV TV music channel.

Digi24 TV news channel was launched on 1 March 2012. Following disagreements with Discovery, the company launched 3 thematic channels in October 2012: Digi World, Digi Life and Digi Animal World. On 10 December 2018, Digi 4K was launched.

=== Energy supplier ===
In April 2015, Digi launched the energy supply service. The company had the most subscribers on the competitive market from the companies that do not have the distribution infrastructure in 2017. In 2019, it increased tariffs by 30% due to a tax added by the government and then by 20%. The company announced that it is gradually giving up the supply service due to the unusual volatility of the electricity price.

== Digi brand ==
RCS & RDS introduced the Digi TV brand for satellite television services in December 2004 in Romania and in 2006 in Hungary, Slovakia, the Czech Republic, Croatia and Serbia. In 2006 the company unified under the Digi brand the cable television, internet and telephony services in Hungary, followed by Slovakia in June 2007. In Romania all the services rebranded Digi in 2009 but it is used together with the old RCS & RDS brand.

== Mobile frequencies ==
The following is a list of Digi Mobil mobile frequencies in Romania.

=== Romania ===
Mobile frequencies used by Digi Mobil in Romania
MCC	MNC	Frequency	Band number	Protocol	Class	Notes
226	05	900 MHz	8	GSM (2×5Mhz)	2G	Voice only GSM network from refarming LTE 900, used for better indoor coverage.
226	05	2100 MHz	1	UMTS/HSPA/HSPA+ (2×5Mhz ~21.6 Mbit/s/5.76 Mbit/s)	3G	Converted to LTE / 5G NSA.
226	05	2100 MHz	B1	LTE (2×10 MHz ~ 75 Mbit/s/37.5 Mbit/s) LTE (2x15 MHz ~ 112.5 Mbit/s/37.5 Mbit/s)	4G	FDD-LTE network launched on 6 October 2016. Coexists with n1 5G NSA in big cities.
226	05	900 MHz	B8	LTE (2×3 MHz ~22.5 Mbit/s/7.5 Mbit/s)	4G	FDD-LTE network launched in September 2019 from refarming UMTS 900. In 2022 began the process of refarming the spectrum back to 2G and closing down the LTE 900 network in favor of LTE 800
226	05	2600 MHz	B38	LTE-TDD (2×20Mhz ~300 Mbit/s)	4G+	TDD-LTE network launched on 1 October 2015. Operational. yet technically outdated network.
226	05	2600 MHz	B41	LTE-TDD	4G	TDD-LTE (limited access to only 4G, no 4G+)
226	05	800 MHz	B20	LTE (2x5 MHz ~ 37.5 Mbit/s/12.5 Mbit/s)	4G	FDD-LTE network launched on 1 January 2022
226	05	2600 MHz	B7	LTE (2x20 MHz ~ 150 Mbit/s/50 Mbit/s)	4G	Only in populous areas and on highways.
226	05	2100 MHz	n1	5G NSA	5G	300 Mbit/s
226	05	3500 MHz	n78	5G (1×50Mhz ~600 Mbit/s)	5G	TDD 5G network launched on 27 June 2019
226	05	2600 MHz	n7	5G (1×45 MHz)	5G	FDD 5G increasing network.

== Shareholding ==
The majority owner of Digi Communications NV is RCS Management SA, which includes politicians among shareholders. In 2016 the shareholders of this company were:

- Zoltán Teszári – 59.23%
- Cable Communications Systems NV – 2.47%
- 8 individual associates – 38.30%

== Subscribers ==
RCS & RDS is one of the leading providers of mobile telephony services in Romania. Below is the evolution of their mobile telephony subscribers over the years:

Year	Subscribers
2018	3,367,000
2017	3,000,000
2016	2,000,000
2013	1,100,000
2010	1,300,000
2009	1,200,000

== Controversy ==
In 2012, the operator removed Discovery channels from the grid, motivating that it would have requested too much money for retransmission. During public discussions, Digi offered to redistribute all Discovery channels in a separate package, but Discovery refused. Only Discovery and TLC returned to the grid in December 2016.

In 2012, Digi removed the Antena TV Group channels from the satellite television grid following disagreements. In 2013, the director of Digi, Ioan Bendei, was blackmailed to sign the distribution contract by the director of Antena Group under threat of being denounced for corruption of the television rights of the national football league. The director of Antena Group was sentenced to prison for blackmail. After evidence of corruption was made public by a journalist in 2013, the directors of Digi and of the Professional Football League were convicted in January 2019. Digi and Antena Group have dropped the litigations in May 2018.

In Hungary, Digi was excluded from the auction for 5G licenses in 2019, motivating its decision on assumptions and facts that are supposed to happen. Digi filed an appeal that was not admitted, then sued NMHH, the regulator of the telecommunications market. Meanwhile, the 5G auction has been closed.

== See also ==
- List of mobile network operators in Europe
