= Television in Romania =

Television in Romania started in August 1955. State television started to broadcast on 31 December 1956. The second television channel followed in 1968, but between 1985 and 1990, there was only one Romanian channel before the return of the second channel. The first experimental color broadcast was made in 1972, from the SECAM format. Official color television tests was introduced in 1981 to 1983 in PAL Regular color broadcast testing began in 1985, but full-color broadcasting didn't arrive until 1986-1990. Private broadcasters arrived in December 1991, with SOTI which was the first private nationwide television station in Central and Eastern Europe. Romania has the highest penetration rates for pay television in the world, with over 98% of all households watching television through cable or satellite.

== Television market ==
The Romanian market is dominated by two large groups: Central European Media Enterprises Ltd. and Intact Media Group, with PRO TV and Antena 1 as main channels and Kanal D also gaining audience share, starting 2014 as the third most popular channel. There are over 50 channels running ads, as of 2015 television being the best type of advertising in Romania. Over 80% of revenue advertising is earned by three players: 35% (48% GRP) PRO TV Group, 26% ANTENA TV Group, 10% Kanal D and 29% (15% GRP) rest of the channels.

== Terrestrial television ==
Romania is the only EU state that didn't end analogue broadcasting because of low interest in terrestrial television. DVB-T tests began in 2005 with two channels in Bucharest and one in Sibiu using MPEG 2 for SD Channels and MPEG 4 for HD Channels. It broadcast public channels (including one in HD) and a for a limited time a few commercial television channel (general, news and music) until September 2016. On July 23, 2013 PRO TV, the largest television channel, changed from free-to-air to pay television. ANCOM cancelled the auction for multiplexes in 2011, and postponed the switching-off to June 17, 2015. Since June 2015 only TVR 1 continued to broadcast analogue until 31 December 2016, later again postponed until 31 December 2018. The rest of analogue broadcasts were shut down.

The absence and lack of implementation of DVB-T in Romania is somehow controversial, as many people are suspecting that this delay and the adoption of DVB-T2 is forced just to sustain the interest of cable and DTH providers, also the lack of interest of the must carry broadcasters in providing channels in terrestrial is very criticized, however the main DVB-T operator in Romania is SNR, which is said to be responsible for this.

In September 2016, Romania turned off DVB-T broadcasts which were experimental, and shifted on DVB-T2 technology. Criticism has appeared in the press about delays, suggesting that this will be a reason for the 20% of households who were receiving free terrestrial television to migrate towards cable and satellite operators. TVR remained the only broadcaster on DVB-T2. It is sent in Free To Air, as it is a public station.

On 23 November 2022, TVR, the only broadcaster on terrestrial in Romania, removed the HD broadcasts for TVR-1 and TVR-2 on DVB-T2, leaving terrestrial broadcasting only with the SD broadcasts of TVR. TVR 1 HD and TVR 2 HD will be available solely on Satellite, Cable and IPTV. This happened mainly because of low demand of the terrestrial services, and to make room for the newly relaunched TVR Cultural.

== Cable television ==
Romania has a high penetration rates for cable television in Europe, with over 79% of all households watching television through a CATV network in 2007. The market is extremely dynamic, and dominated by two giant companies – Romanian-based RCS&RDS (DIGI) and U.K.-based (Vodafone). Both offer internet broadband, fixed (VOIP) and mobile telephony. The national CATV network is being improved, and most households are being migrated towards digital cable solutions.

== Satellite television ==
After cable, satellite subscriptions hold second place, and are mainly popular in rural areas, where cable television and optical fiber networks were not widely available in the second half of the 2000s. The main operators are: Telekom TV, DIGI, Focus Sat operated by UPC Romania (the first DTH platform in Romania), FreeSat, and Orange operated by Orange Romania. Most of providers offer a small number of HD channels (10 channels), except Focus Sat (20 channels) and Orange, which is mainly dedicated to HD broadcasting with 50 channels. Focus Sat and FreeSat are prepaid services and can be also used with a CAM and a smart card. Defunct DTH Platforms are: Boom TV and AKTA Satelit, which were acquired by Romtelecom, now Telekom Romania.

== IPTV ==
IP television: Romtelecom (now Telekom) slowly started to upgrade its ADSL network to VDSL in 2008, and launched IPTV on December 8, 2009. It is popular in business (companies, corporations etc.) sector rather than consumer. It is provided by Telekom (formerly Romtelecom), INES. RCS RDS tried unsuccessfully to implement IPTV being available to a limited number of subscribers since 2010.

== List of channels ==
The following is a list of television channels broadcast in Romania.

A&E Networks UK Channels operated by A&E Networks UK, a joint-venture with Sky plc:

- Crime & Investigation
- History

AMC Networks International

- AMC
- Extreme Sports
- JimJam
- Minimax
- TV Paprika

Antenna Group

- AXN
- AXN Black
- AXN Spin
- AXN White
- Kiss TV

BBC Worldwide

- BBC Earth
- BBC First
- BBC News

Central European Media Enterprises

- Acasă
- Acasă Gold
- Pro Arena
- Pro Cinema
- Pro TV
- Pro TV Internațional

Clever Group

- Prima Comedy
- Prima History
- Prima News
- Prima Sport
- Prima TV
- Prima World

DIGI

- Digi24
- Digi Animal World
- Digi Life
- Digi Sport (Romania)
- Digi World
- Music Channel (50%)

Doğan Media İnternational SA

- Kanal D
- Kanal D2

Skydance

- Animal Planet
- Cartoonito
- Cartoon Network
- Cinemax
- Cinemax 2
- CNN International
- Comedy Central
- Discovery Channel
- Eurosport 1
- Eurosport 2
- Food Network (joint-venture with Tribune Media)
- HBO
- HBO 2
- HBO 3
- HGTV
- Investigation Discovery
- MTV
- TLC
- Travel Channel
- Warner TV

Channels operated by Nickelodeon UK, a joint venture with Sky plc:

- Nickelodeon
- Nick Jr.
- Nicktoons

Disney Channels Worldwide EMEA

- Baby TV
- Disney Channel
- Disney Junior
- Nat Geo People
- National Geographic
- National Geographic Wild

Intact Media Group

- Antena 1
- Antena 3 CNN
- Antena Stars
- Antena Internațional
- Happy Channel
- Chefi.ro

Mooz TV

- Sport Extra

NBCUniversal International Networks

- CNBC
- Diva
- E!

Tematic Media

- Duck TV
- Shorts TV

TVR

- TVR 1
- TVR 2
- TVR 3
- TVR Cultural
- TVR Info
- TVR Internațional
- TVR Sport

Viasat World

- Viasat Epic Drama
- Viasat Explore
- Viasat History
- Viasat Kino
- Viasat Nature

Main single-channel broadcasters

- B1
- Realitatea Plus
- România TV

International channels

- Arte
- Al Jazeera
- Balkanika TV
- Bloomberg
- CGTN
- Deutsche Welle
- Duna TV
- Euronews (in English)
- Fashion TV
- France 24
- KBS World
- Mezzo
- ProSieben
- Rai 1
- Rai 3
- Russia Today
- RTL
- Sat.1
- Sky News
- Super RTL
- TV5Monde (partially with subtitles)
- TVE Internacional
- Trace Urban
- Trace Sport Stars

== Most viewed channels ==
Most viewed channels for 2023 are:

Position	Channel	Share of total viewing (%)
1	Pro TV	18.7
2	Antena 1	13.3
3	Kanal D	11.3
4	Romania TV	6.8
5	Antena 3 CNN	5.0
6	Happy Channel	2.7
7	Antena Stars	2.5
8	Digi Sport 1	1.9
9	Film Cafe	1.9
10	Digi 24	1.9
11	Realitatea Plus	1.8
12	Pro Cinema	1.3
13	Prima TV	1.4
14	TVR 1	1.3
16	TVR 2	1.0
17	Diva	1.0
18	AMC	1.0
19	Acasa	1.0
20	Cartoon Network	0.8

Given Romania's extensive cable coverage, many channels receive considerable viewing shares. Pro TV is the most viewed channel. Ratings data is measured by TNS-AGB International (2005–2007) and GfK Romania (2008–2011) on behalf of ARMADATA S.R.L.

Viewing ratings in percent
Channel	2014	2015	2016	2017	2018	2019	2020	2021	2022	2023
Pro TV	3.7	3.3	3.8	4.1	3.9	3.9	3.9	3.8	3.6	3.5
Antena 1	3.0	2.9	3.2	2.7	2.6	2.6	3.0	3.0	2.5	2.5
Kanal D	1.7	2.0	2.3	2.1	2.2	2.2	2.4	2.5	2.0	2.1
România TV	1.0	1.1	1.2	1.4	1.4	1.6	1.6	1.6	1.4	1.3
Antena 3 CNN	1.6	1.4	1.2	1.2	1.1	1.1	1.1	1.1	1.1	0.9
TVR 1	0.9	0.8	0.6	0.5	0.6	0.5	0.5	0.4	0.4	0.3
Prima TV	0.7	0.6	0.6	0.6	0.6	0.4	0.5	0.4	0.3	0.3
Antena Stars	0.4	0.5	0.5	0.5	0.5	0.4	0.3	0.4	0.5	0.5
Acasă / Pro 2	0.6	0.6	0.4	0.3	0.4	0.4	0.2	0.2	0.2	0.2
B1 TV	0.6	0.5	0.4	0.4	0.3	0.4	0.4	0.2	0.2	0.1
Digi Sport 1		0.1	0.2	0.3	0.3	0.4	0.3	0.4	0.4	0.4
Realitatea Plus	0.5	0.4	0.2	0.3	0.4	0.3	0.3	0.4	0.4	0.3
TVR 2	0.4	0.3	0.2	0.3	0.4	0.3	0.3	0.3	0.3	0.2
Cartoon Network	0.3	0.3	0.4	0.3	0.3	0.3	0.3	0.2	0.2	0.2
Digi24	0.2	0.3	0.3	0.3	0.3	0.3	0.5	0.4	0.4	0.4
Pro Cinema	0.2	0.3	0.3	0.3	0.3	0.3	0.3	0.3	0.3	0.3
Cartoonito / Boomerang	0.2	0.2	0.2	0.2	0.3	0.3	0.3	0.2	0.2	0.1
Happy Channel	0.1	0.1	0.2	0.2	0.2	0.3	0.3	0.4	0.5	0.5

== See also ==
- Media of Romania
- List of Romanian language television channels
- List of television stations in Romania
- List of Romanian television series
