= Grivco =

Romanian holding company

- Company type: Private
- Industry: holding
- Founded: 1991
- Headquarters: Bucharest, Romania
- Key people: Dan Voiculescu (CEO)
- Revenue: ▲$400 million USD
- Number of employees: 2,800
- Website: http://www.grivco.ro/

Grivco is one of the largest Romanian holding companies located in Bucharest. The holding is formed by more than 20 companies including fields of activity like trade, media, energy, industry and services. The holding also holds a controlling stake in one of the largest media trusts in Romania, the Intact company.

The GRIVCO Group is also present on international markets, with offices in Cairo, Istanbul, Moscow, Belgrade, Beijing, Beirut.

The most well-known company of the group of companies is the Intact Media Group, which includes the television stations Antena 1 (generalist), Antena 3 (news) and Happy Channel (lifestyle), the newspapers Jurnalul Național, Gazeta Sporturilor, and Financial Week, the stations Romantic FM and News FM radio. The GRIVCO Group also owns the energy company Grivco Energy, involved in the energy scandal provided by the Rovinari and Turceni complexes in 2006. The onerous contracts concluded between November and December 2005 caused the two energy complexes a damage of RON 15.7 million. These preferential contracts benefited seven companies that managed the performance of buying in-band energy (ie 24 hours a day) at prices that were below the production costs of the two thermal power plants.

Areas of activity of the Grivco holding company:

- media (Intact Media Group)
- business and management consulting
- applied research and investments
- dairy production
- production of agricultural products
- distribution
- restaurant
