= GSP TV =

- Country: Romania
- Broadcast area: Romania

Programming
- Picture format: 576i SDTV

Ownership
- Owner: Antena TV Group (Intact Media Group)
- Sister channels: Antena 1 Antena Stars; Antena 3 CNN; Antena Internațional; Happy Channel; Chefi.ro

History
- Launched: 26 July 2008
- Closed: 3 April 2014
- Replaced by: ZU TV

Links
- Website: www.gsptv.ro

GSP TV (named after the newspaper Gazeta Sporturilor) was a private commercial television channel from Romania, focused on sports shows. It was launched on July 26, 2008, and owned by Antena TV Group. From September 14, 2012, GSP TV became a station for men. From April 3, 2014 to June 15, 2026, GSP TV was replaced by ZU TV. On June 15, 2026, Chefi.ro replaced ZU TV.

== Shows ==
- Meciul zilei (Match of the Day)– a talk-show about sports hosted daily by Viorel Grigoroiu
- Contraatac– a talk-show about sports hosted daily by Dan Udrea
- Radio GSP
- Fight News Extra
- This is IT – a talk-show about IT hosted daily by Costin Deşliu
- Smile cu Cătălin Oprișan
- FootbALL Inclusive
- Ginx TV
- Sport Cafe
- Fight News

== Competitions ==
=== Football ===
- Liga I
- EFL Championship
- MLS

=== Fights ===
- UFC
- RXF

=== Billiard ===
- Mosconi Cup
