= Dan Voiculescu =

Romanian politician and businessman

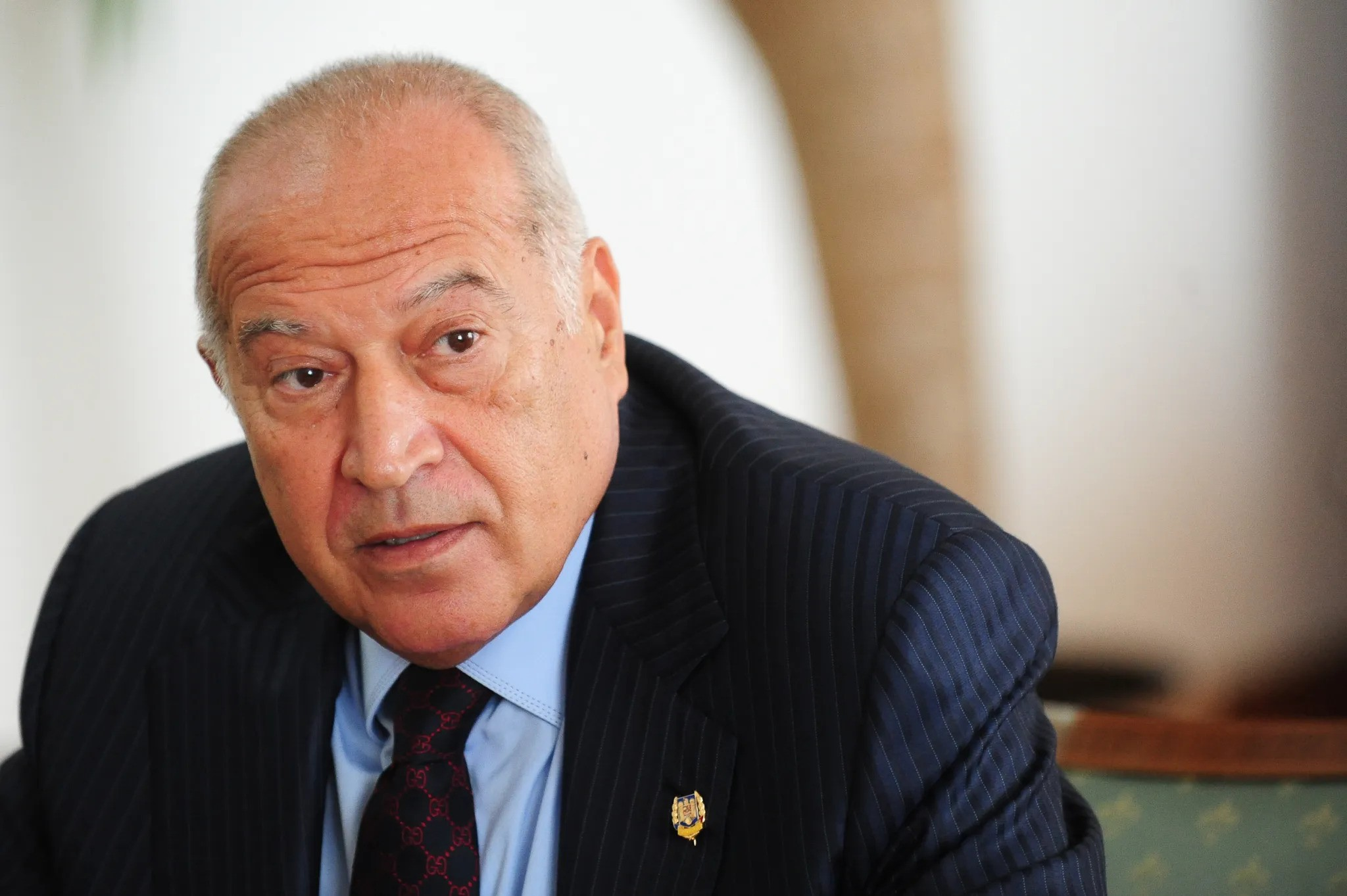
- Voiculescu in 2013

Senator of Romania
- In office December 13, 2004 – December 14, 2008
- Constituency: 42 Bucharest
- In office December 15, 2008 – June 25, 2012
- In office January 22, 2013 – January 28, 2013
- Constituency: 8 Bucharest

Personal details
- Born: September 25, 1946 (age 79) Bucharest, Romania
- Party: Social Liberal Humanist Party (since 2015)
- Other political affiliations: Conservative Party (1991–2015)
- Domestic partner: Liana Voiculescu

Dan Voiculescu (Romanian pronunciation: [ˈdan vojkuˈlesku]; born September 25, 1946) is a doctor of economics, university professor, and Romanian politician, former businessman. He is the founding president of the Romanian Humanist Party (PUR), which later became the Conservative Party (subsequently absorbed by the Alliance of Liberals and Democrats Party) and has since become the Social-Liberal Humanist Party. Dan Voiculescu was elected senator for Bucharest in three legislatures.

On February 5, 2011, Dan Voiculescu initiated the creation of the Social-Liberal Union (USL), a parliamentary and pre-electoral political alliance. The “Humanists” played a significant role in shaping the USL that year. In 2012, the alliance won the parliamentary elections by a landslide, securing over 66% of the vote and becoming the most powerful political coalition Romania had seen since 1990.

In August 2014, Voiculescu was sentenced to 10 years in prison in the case involving the privatization of the Food Research Institute (ICA). He was conditionally released in July 2017 after serving two years and eleven months.

In August 2024, the Bucharest Court of Appeal definitively upheld the suspension of both the additional penalties and the order to recover damages in the ICA case. The decision followed a final ruling by the Bucharest Tribunal, which found that the DNA expert who had calculated the amount of damages had committed perjury.

Dan Voiculescu was one of the richest men in Romania, with a fortune estimated at 1.5–1.6 billion euros, according to Top 300 Richest Romanian People launched by the Capital magazine in October 2009. The Intact Media Group, founded by Dan Voiculescu, includes several major television stations (most notably Antena 1 and Antena 3), radio stations, as well as top newspapers and magazines (most notably Jurnalul Naţional and Gazeta Sporturilor). According to Top 300 issued by Capital, developing televisions and launching GSP TV and Radio station ZU, as well as strengthening the print media, have been among the main directions that have marked the group's businesses in 2008.

== Early life ==
For his secondary studies, he went to the Emil Racoviţă High School. Starting in 1969, he studied at the Academy of Economic Studies (ASE) in Bucharest, obtaining a B.A. in 1974, and a Ph.D. in 1977. In 1991, he obtained a Ph.D. in economics from the unaccredited Pacific Western University (Hawaii), in Honolulu, Hawaii, and became a professor at ASE.

According to the autobiography published on the official website, he was born in a modest family, his father being a plumber and his mother a housewife. He grew up in the Bucharest neighborhood of Bariera Vergului, near the 23 August skating rink, where he practiced ice hockey. In 1969 he fulfilled the military service in a military unit in Focsani, obtaining the rank of reserve intendancy lieutenant.

== Professional and Political activities ==
=== Pre-Revolutionary Romania ===
==== Vitrocim (1970-1982) ====
After graduating from the Faculty of Foreign Trade at the Bucharest University of Economic Studies, Dan Voiculescu was assigned to the Tehnoforest enterprise. From there, he was transferred to a newly formed foreign trade enterprise, ICE Vitrocim, where he worked as an economist and subsequently as a department head between 1970 and 1982.

==== Crescent (1982-1992) ====
Between 1982 and 1992, he was active within the Chamber of Commerce and Industry of Romania and served as the director of the Romanian representation of Crescent Commercial & Maritime Ltd., a company owned by Fouad Sanbar, a Greek citizen. Following Fouad Sanbar's death, Voiculescu inherited the Crescent company.

==== Post-Revolutionary Romania ====
In 1991, Voiculescu founded the Humanist Party of Romania, which changed its name to the Conservative Party (PC) in May 2005. Voiculescu held the executive presidency of the political formation between 1991 and 2005, a period during which the party became an ally of the Social Democratic Party under the Adrian Năstase government. In 2008, despite being officially in the opposition, the PSD achieved a lower score than the PDL, marking a weaker performance than in the 2004 elections. Consequently, the PSD lost approximately 0.9 million voters: dropping from 3.2 million votes in 2004 (when it ran alongside Dan Voiculescu's PUR) to 2.35 million votes. Under Voiculescu's leadership, the party also markedly changed its doctrine to embrace conservative values in line with the views of the European People's Party in the European Parliament. The PC, however, did not join the European People's Party.

The PC, then called the PUR, supported the Social Democratic Party (PSD)-led government from 2000 to 2004, and ran in coalition with the PSD in the 2004 parliamentary and presidential elections. The PC was also part of the ruling coalition led by Prime Minister Călin Popescu-Tăriceanu from December 2004 until the party withdrew in 2006. According to Freedom House, one reason the government of Popescu-Tăriceanu included the small PC, which received support from only 2 percent of the population, was due to the strength of Voiculescu family's Antenna 1 television station. PC ran in a coalition with PSD in the 2008 legislative elections, and Voiculescu was elected senator in a Bucharest district.

As member of the Romanian Senate, Voiculescu has been strong in his opposition to Romanian President Traian Băsescu, who he states has exceeded constitutional boundaries and abused power. In March, 2007, he established a special commission within the Parliament to investigate Băsescu's actions as president and sponsored the legislation in the Parliament that led to a national referendum over whether Băsescu should remain in office. Voiculescu was also strongly opposed to former Minister of Justice Monica Macovei.

In April 2007, the Parliamentary Committee led by Senator Dan Voiculescu managed, for the first time in the post-revolutionary Romania, the suspension of an acting president. The report drawn up by the "Voiculescu Committee" was adopted in the Romanian Parliament, with 322 votes "for" and 108 "against"; President Traian Băsescu was thus suspended from his function.

Voiculescu opposed a draft law proposed by Justice Minister Monica Macovei and supported by the European Commission to set up a special agency for checking assets declarations for MPs and other senior officials. He subsequently supported a version characterized as "watered down" by the international media.

In September 2007, Dan Voiculescu resigned from his senator function as a form of protest against the blocking in the Romanian Parliament, of various important social laws. They were about promoting his projects on extending the contracts of tenants in the nationalized houses, reducing VAT on food, solidarity fund for pensioners and non-taxation of reinvested profits, legislation designed to bring more money to pensioners with low incomes, to lower prices on basic food or assist companies to reinvest their profits.

In November 2008, by occasion of the first elections held in the plurality system, Dan Voiculescu returned to the Romanian Parliament, obtaining 21,708 votes in the 8th college in Bucharest, and in December 2008 he was elected vice-president of the Senate of Romania, with 83 votes for and 2 against.

=== Voiculescu's Law ===
Voiculescu initiated a bill, now named after him, that allows tenants of buildings that were nationalized during communism to stay in them, while the former owners receive only financial compensation. After a long legislative and constitutional battle, president Băsescu signed it into law in 2009, even though he and his party opposed it. Emil Boc's government however did not apply it, and was sued by tenants' associations.

=== Secret police involvement ===
CNSAS revealed that Voiculescu acted as an informer for the Securitate by the names of "Felix" and "Mircea". Voiculescu denies, however, having been an official collaborator (with a signed agreement) or an officer of the Securitate and is appealing the CNSAS' ruling to that effect. He has said he will resign from the Senate if the verdict is not overturned on appeal. He blamed the initial findings against him on Băsescu, who, according to Voiculescu, launched a campaign to undermine him.

According to the CNSAS (National Council for the Study of the Securitate Archives), Voiculescu was first recruited by the Securitate in 1970 under the code name "Mircea," with the mission of collecting information about foreign citizens by acting as a German-language translator for them; because the results were unsatisfactory, this collaboration allegedly ended the following year. In 1973, he was allegedly given the code name "Felix," and over a two-year period, he reportedly provided a series of informative notes regarding foreign citizens with whom he had contact. In 1975, Voiculescu became a member of the Romanian Communist Party (PCR), and the Securitate allegedly dropped "Felix" as an informant, though he continued to be used on an occasional basis. This was the case with a 1977 note, which proved important for the CNSAS in formulating the accusation of political policing.

In 2003, 2004, and 2005, the National Council for the Study of the Securitate Archives (CNSAS) issued Decision No. 126 of November 11, 2003, Certificate No. 371 of October 5, 2004, and Decision No. 101 of May 19, 2005, stating that there were no indications at that time that Dan Voiculescu had been an agent or collaborator of the Securitate, or that he had engaged in political policing. On June 5, 2006, the Political Bureau of the Conservative Party nominated Dan Voiculescu for the position of Deputy Prime Minister in the Government of Romania. Until that date, the Romanian Intelligence Service (SRI) had repeatedly refused to hand over a large number of files requested by the CNSAS, which had previously been classified. At the express request of the CNSAS, a joint SRI-CNSAS commission met to discuss the status of these files—including some containing information about the relationship between Voiculescu and the Securitate—in the context of a legal expansion of the scope of documents analyzable by the CNSAS. Through a decision made in June 2006, the CNSAS confirmed Dan Voiculescu's collaboration with the Securitate as political police under the conspiratorial name "Felix". Dan Voiculescu appealed the decision, but his appeal was rejected, receiving only 3 favorable votes. The verdict was also confirmed in court, as required by law, with the Bucharest Court of Appeal rejecting the senator's challenge on February 5, 2010. The Court of Appeal justified its decision on the grounds that the informative notes violated the fundamental rights and freedoms of the monitored citizens.

Tom Gallagher wrote in a 2004 paper that it is supposed that Dan Voiculescu held the rank of General within the intelligence service before Romania's 1989 anti-communist revolution, but nothing has been proved till now. Ziua newspaper commented however that if Voiculescu was a "covert general" this fact would be extremely hard to prove; official records show that Voiculescu was a reserve army sub-lieutenant.

Following the challenges raised in this case, the Constitutional Court ruled that the Law of the National Council for the Study of the Securitate Archives (CNSAS) was unconstitutional, admitting the exception raised in the Dan Voiculescu–CNSAS trial. The newspaper Jurnalul Național, owned by the Intact Media Group, ran the headline that day: "Dan Voiculescu has defeated the CNSAS". The law was subsequently amended by emergency ordinance, bringing it into compliance with the Constitutional Court's decision by making court confirmation of the verdict mandatory. In Dan Voiculescu's case, the verdict was confirmed by the Bucharest Court of Appeal in early 2010 and by the High Court of Cassation and Justice in March 2011. The evidence upheld by the High Court included his file from the Third Directorate of the Ministry of Internal Affairs, as well as an informative note in which Dan Voiculescu reported on the actions of an Austrian citizen of Romanian origin.

In 1979, the Securitate opened the "Dorin" file, in which Voiculescu was the target of surveillance. He was suspected due to his nonconformist behavior, his luxurious lifestyle, and his unauthorized contacts with foreign citizens during trips abroad, which violated regulations.

== Academic activities ==
Starting in 1996, Dan Voiculescu taught courses for 8 years at the Bucharest University of Economic Studies (ASE), within the Department of International Economic Relations, covering the subject "Competition and Competitiveness". He collaborated with eleven other co-authors on the work "Competitiveness Analysis of the Romanian Economy. Horizon 2000-2005-2010. Alternative Strategic Solutions", published by the Romanian Academy Publishing House in 1998.

Two years later, he received the Virgil Madgearu Award for the year 1998 from the Romanian Academy. This was part of the Romanian Academy Awards, a newly established series of distinctions across multiple fields, with this specific award being one of the seven prizes in the "Economic, Legal, and Sociological Sciences" section.

From 2003 to 2007, he suspended his teaching activities in protest against the ease with which doctoral degrees were granted to individuals of questionable morality or professionalism. He returned to teaching in 2007, and in 2008 he requested the Senate's Legal Committee, along with 16 other senators, to approve his concurrent accumulation of functions. The Legal Committee issued a favorable opinion on his request, allowing him to continue his activity as a university professor at ASE parallel to his role as a senator.

Starting in 2020, he resumed university activity as a student, completing the bachelor's degree program at the Faculty of Orthodox Theology in Bucharest, Social Work Department, in June 2023.

== Business activities ==
After 1990, he founded the Grivco Holding, becoming the majority shareholder in 1992. Initially, its main activity was foreign trade. This was followed by involvement in media and the launch of an A4-format newspaper, Jurnalul Național, and the first commercial television station in Romania, Antena 1. Over time, the group's activities focused on the foreign trade of industrial materials, energy trade, agriculture, and mass media, giving rise to the GRIVCO holding, currently structured into 3 divisions: commerce, media, and industry & services. Dan Voiculescu reached his first million dollars in 1996, consisting of approximately 400,000 in dividends from GRIVCO and around 600,000 in dividends from Antena 1. The most well-known company of the Grivco group is Intact Media Group, with the Antena TV Group subgroup, which together comprise the television stations Antena 1, Antena 2, Antena 3, Euforia TV, Antena International, and GSP TV; the radio stations Romantic FM and Radio ZU; the publications Jurnalul Național, Gazeta Sporturilor, Săptămâna Financiară, Felicia, Confidential, BBC Top Gear, BBC Good Food, and BBC Science Focus; the Intact printing house, and the "Mereu Aproape" Foundation.

In 2006, Dan Voiculescu donated all the shares he held in the group of companies he founded, in equal parts, to his two daughters, withdrawing entirely from business. The media trust was transferred in 2006 to his daughter, Camelia Voiculescu, following Dan Voiculescu's intention to occupy the position of Deputy Prime Minister in the Tăriceanu government, representing the Conservative Party, a post from which George Copos had resigned. In October 2009, Capital magazine evaluated the wealth of the entire Voiculescu family at 1.5–1.6 billion euros. Following Voiculescu's conviction and imprisonment, the family's wealth decreased over the next 6 years to 180–200 million euros.

Between 2013 and 2017, Antena TV Group was prosecuted in a corporate blackmail case. Sorin Alexandrescu, the general director, threatened Ioan Bendei, the administrator of RCS & RDS. Alexandrescu demanded the signing of a retransmission contract for Antena TV Group stations under dictated terms, threatening a media smear campaign regarding alleged corruption if the demand was refused. RCS & RDS reported the extortion. The National Anticorruption Directorate (DNA) investigated the acts. Dan Voiculescu was indicted initially for complicity in the blackmail operation. On May 12, 2016, the Bucharest Court of Appeal issued the initial ruling, convicting Voiculescu and sentencing him to two years in prison. On June 28, 2017, the High Court of Cassation and Justice issued the final verdict on appeal: Dan Voiculescu was not guilty of complicity to blackmail.

== Social & Philantropic Activities ==
Dan Voiculescu established the Dan Voiculescu Foundation for the Development of Romania in 1990. Subsequently, he founded the Foundation for the Defense of Citizens Against State Abuses (FACIAS). One of FACIAS's actions was the reconstitution of the pension rights of Viorica Vișan, a woman sentenced to 16 years in prison due to a miscarriage of justice and released after 10 years.

=== The Dan Voiculescu Foundation for the Development of Romania ===
FDVDR is a non-governmental organization in Romania operating in the field of education. Its educational projects cover subjects from the school curriculum, while simultaneously developing programs dedicated to vocational education, entrepreneurial education, and excellence.

The FDVDR scholarship program is intended to encourage and assist exceptional youth with outstanding results in the fields of science, culture, or technology. Over time, FDVDR scholarship recipients have included Ionuț Budișteanu, Matei Bucur Mihăescu, and others. FDVDR has also awarded awards of excellence to personalities in the fields of science and culture. Award recipients include Justin Capră, Radu Beligan, Gabriela Ficz, and others.

=== During the Coronavirus Crisis ===
In April 2020, following an appeal by the Intensive Care Unit (ATI) of the Fundeni Clinical Institute in Bucharest, the Dan Voiculescu Foundation for the Development of Romania contributed to the purchase of external triage units to protect critical patients and the medical staff of the Fundeni hospital.

On April 3, 2020, through an open letter, Dan Voiculescu proposed that the Government of Romania take measures to prevent a food crisis and requested a ban on the export of "food products, including cereals and raw materials, for a period of one year."

Through Military Ordinance No. 8 announced by the Government on April 10, 2020, the Government decided to suspend exports for a series of agri-food products, including wheat, barley, oats, rice, soybeans, as well as wheat flour, oilcakes, bakery and pastry products, biscuits, seed oil, and sugar. The measure was valid throughout the entire state of emergency.

== Corruption investigation ==
The Romanian National Anti-corruption Department (DNA) announced on April 3, 2007, that it was investigating Voiculescu, his daughter, and several business associates for money laundering, with regard to funds obtained through the national lottery. Voiculescu denied all the charges, claiming the investigation was politically motivated and that the transactions were legal.

In October 2009, following some articles in the press, the vice-president of the Romanian Senate, Dan Voiculescu, has undergone a vetting process carried out by the National Agency for Fiscal Administration (ANAF), verification based on which ANAF has established that the allegations surrounding the senator Dan Voiculescu have no real basis.

=== The ICA Trial ===
At the end of 2008, Dan Voiculescu was indicted by the National Anticorruption Directorate, accused of using his influence in 2003 as the leader of a governing party to facilitate Grivco's acquisition of the majority stake in the Food Research Institute (ICA).

The file was sent to the High Court of Cassation and Justice due to Voiculescu's status as a member of parliament.[91] The trial proceedings were postponed seven times until November 2010. In December 2010, Dan Voiculescu was heard, claiming the file was politically ordered by Traian Băsescu. Six new postponements followed; the trial advanced and was transferred from the High Court of Cassation and Justice to the Bucharest Tribunal following Voiculescu's resignation from Parliament. On September 26, 2013, he was sentenced by the Bucharest Tribunal to 5 years in prison for the crime of money laundering. Both the DNA and Voiculescu, along with other co-defendants, filed appeals against the sentence, which were debated at the Bucharest Court of Appeal on August 4 and 5, 2014. On August 8, 2014, the Bucharest Court of Appeal admitted the DNA's appeal regarding Dan Voiculescu, changed the legal classification of the acts attributed to him, and increased his sentence to 10 years in prison.

On September 26, 2013, Dan Voiculescu was found guilty and sentenced to 5 years in prison. In the case of using his political connections to influence the sell of the Institute for Alimentary Research to Grivco a company that he had a stake in. The case was postponed several years because Dan Voiculescu resigned several times from the Romanian Parliament.

Voiculescu was incarcerated at Rahova Penitentiary on August 8, 2014, and the National Agency for Fiscal Administration (ANAF) seized several of his properties to cover the damages. In less than a year and a half in prison, Voiculescu wrote eleven books, which brought him a reduction of over 300 days from his served sentence. He was released on parole from prison after 2 years and 11 months, although the damages had not been paid.

Following the pronouncement of the decision, one of the judges in the case, Camelia Bogdan, was excluded from the magistracy by the judges' section of the Superior Council of Magistracy because she received money from one of the parties involved in the trial, namely the Ministry of Agriculture; the CSM decision was, however, annulled on appeal. Subsequently, during an interview with Evenimentul Zilei TV, journalist Adrian Ursu stated that Antena 3 had been informed that if they left Mircea Băsescu alone, Dan Voiculescu would be acquitted.

On September 11, 2025, the High Court of Cassation and Justice (ÎCCJ) annulled a dismissal ordinance issued by the Prosecutor's Office attached to the High Court of Cassation and Justice and definitively established that former judge Camelia Bogdan committed the crime of abuse of office when judging the ICA file, with the ÎCCJ maintaining the dismissal of the case while changing its legal basis. The decision is final.

== Criticism ==
President Băsescu has accused Voiculescu of being a "media mogul" who uses his media group to fight political battles. He further accused Voiculescu of trying to control, through the media, the politics of the country. In May 2007, Băsescu said "Oligarchs should not be confused with the business community. They are the few who have made fortunes thanks to facilities from government, people who have become very rich and now give orders to politicians, those who are supported financially by the oligarchs and who have turned into puppets of certain businessmen like Voiculescu, [Rompetrol owner Dinu] Patriciu, and many others." An Organization for Security and Co-operation in Europe report on the 2009 presidential election found that the newspaper Jurnalul Naţional and television station Antena 1, both owned by Voiculescu's family, were biased against the incumbent Băsescu. In the last years, Voiculescu tried to reinvent his public image through the Internet. He started a personal blog, showing a much lighter side of his personality, and even began writing satirical guest posts for online journals non-related to his media empire.

== See also ==
- List of corruption scandals in Romania
