= Antenna =

Antenna (pl.: antennas or antennae) most commonly refers to:

- Antenna (zoology), one of a pair of appendages used for sensing in arthropods
- Antenna (radio), or aerial, an electronic device that transmits, receives, or detects radio waves
  - Antenna types

Antenna, antennas, antennae or antena may also refer to:

== Broadcasting companies and channels ==
- Antenna Group or ANT1 Group, a media company and broadcaster in Greece
- Antenna TV, an American TV channel
- Antena 1 (disambiguation), several channels
- Antena 2 (disambiguation), several channels
- Antena 3 (disambiguation), several channels
- Antena Internațional, an international TV channel for Romanians
- Antena Radio Jelah, Bosnian radio station
- Antena Sarajevo, Bosnian radio station
- Antena Stars, a Romanian television channel
- Radio Antena M, Montenegrin radio station
- TV Antena 10, a television station in Teresina, Piauí, Brazil

== Film and television ==
- Antenna (film), a 1970 Dutch short film
- Antenna (TV series), an Australian TV program for children
- Antenna Documentary Film Festival, held annually in Sydney, Australia
- Antenna Awards, Australian awards for community television
- "Antenna", an Aqua Teen Hunger Force episode

== Literature ==
- Antenna (journal), news journal of the Royal Entomological Society
- Antenna (magazine), a web publication by Townsquare Media, formerly a print magazine

== Music ==
=== Bands and labels ===
- Antenna (band), an American indie rock band 1991–1994
- Antenna, an Australian band with Dave Faulkner
- Antena, an electro-samba group of French singer-songwriter Isabelle Antena, and their 1982 mini-album
- Antenna (record label), a South Korean record label

=== Albums ===
- Antenna (Cave In album), 2003
- Antenna (GO!GO!7188 album), 2009
- Antenna (Mrs. Green Apple album), 2023
- Antenna (ZZ Top album), 1994
- Antennae (album), by Joe Morris, 1997

=== Songs ===
- "Antenna" (song), by Fuse ODG, 2013
- "Antenna", a song by The Church from the 1988 album Starfish
- "Antenna", a song by Kraftwerk from the 1975 album Radio-Activity
- "Antenna", a song by Sonic Youth from the 2009 album The Eternal
- "Antenna", a song by Bonobo from the 2013 album The North Borders

== Other uses ==
- Antennae Galaxies, a pair of interacting galaxies in the constellation Corvus

== See also ==
- Aerial (disambiguation)
- Antenna array
