= Lithuania Bushido Federation =

MMA promoter based in Lithuania

Lithuania Bushido Federation Lietuvos Bušido federacija
- Industry: Mixed martial arts and kickboxing promotion
- Founded: 1999
- Headquarters: Vilnius, Lithuania
- Key people: Donatas Simanaitis (president); Col. Česlovas Jezerskas (honorary president)
- Website: bushido.lt

Lithuania Bushido Federation (Lithuanian: Lietuvos Bušido federacija), also known as Bushido Lithuania, is the largest combat sports promotion in Lithuania.

LBF was founded in 1999 with the name Lietuvos Bušido RINGS federacija as the Lithuanian stable-branch of the Japanese promotion RINGS and held its first event in 2000. RINGS fighter Volk Han was influential in starting the promotion.

As of 2012, LBF unites 34 Lithuanian sports clubs and has been holding the international mixed martial arts series Bushido Fighting Championship, domestic MMA series S.W.A.T., international kickboxing series King of Kings, international MMA series with Hero's Lithuania brand, as well as events carrying the brands of their partners such as K-1, Shooto, ADCC, Pancrase, ZST and Shootboxing.

The MMA organisation cooperated with Rizin Fighting Federation for the Rizin World Grand Prix 2015 events held December 29 and 31, 2015. The former Pride FC Heavyweight champion Fedor Emelianenko headlined the NYE Rizin main event.

== Media coverage ==
MMA Bushido events are broadcast on FightBox, DAZN and Prime Fight. Events are sometimes also broadcast by regional broadcasters like Sportal.bg and TV1 in Bulgaria. Some past broadcasters include TV4, TV3, Lietuvos rytas TV and Sport1.

A 3-year global broadcast deal with DAZN was announced 30 September 2022. (Note: Excluding in Estonia, Latvia and Lithuania.)

== Events ==
#	Event	Date	Venue	Location
	MMA Bushido 99	November 14, 2025	Twinsbet Arena	Vilnius, Lithuania
	MMA Bushido 98	September 13, 2025	Dinamo Arena	Yerevan, Armenia
	Bushido SWAT 96	March 29, 2025	Snow Arena	Druskininkai, Lithuania
	Bushido SWAT 95	December 24, 2024	Alytus Arena	Alytus, Lithuania
	MMA Bushido 94	November 16, 2024	Twinsbet Arena	Vilnius, Lithuania
	Bushido SWAT 94	October 12, 2024	Širvintos Sport Center	Širvintos, Lithuania
	MMA Bushido 93	September 21, 2024	Twinsbet Arena	Vilnius, Lithuania
	Bushido SWAT 93	September 14, 2024	Snow Arena	Druskininkai, Lithuania
	Bushido SWAT 92	May 18, 2024	Širvintos Sport Center	Širvintos, Lithuania
	Bushido SWAT 91	April 27, 2024	Alytus Arena	Alytus, Lithuania
	MMA Bushido 92	March 16, 2024	Avia Solutions Group Arena	Vilnius, Lithuania
	MMA Bushido 91	February 17, 2024	Atta Centre	Riga, Latvia
	MMA Bushido 90 in Belgium	January 13, 2024	La Sucrerie	(Belgium) Wavre, Lithuania
	MMA Bushido 88 in Vilnius	November 18, 2023	Avia Solutions Group Arena	Vilnius, Lithuania
	Bushido SWAT’90	September 30, 2023	Legendos Club	Vilnius, Lithuania
	Bushido SWAT’89	June 3, 2023	Kauno OAZĖ	Kaunas, Lithuania
	Bushido SWAT’88	April 29, 2023	Alytus Arena	Alytus, Lithuania
	MMA Bushido 88 in Sofia	April 22, 2023	Universiada Hall	Sofia, Bulgaria
	MMA Bushido 87 in Brussels	March 11, 2023	Kraainem Sport & Event Village	Brussels, Belgium
	Bushido SWAT’87	February 4, 2023	Kauno OAZĖ	Kaunas, Lithuania
	Bushido SWAT’86	December 17, 2022		Alytus, Lithuania
	MMA Bushido 86 in Riga	November 26, 2022	Atta Centre	Riga, Latvia
	MMA Bushido 85 in Kaunas	November 5, 2022	Žalgiris Arena	Kaunas, Lithuania
	Bushido SWAT’85	September 24, 2022	Zalgirio Arena Amphitheatre	Kaunas, Lithuania
	MMA Bushido 84 in Brussels	June 19, 2022	Kraainem Sport & Event Village	Brussels, Belgium
	Bushido SWAT’84	February 12, 2022	Alytus Arena	Kaunas, Lithuania
	MMA Bushido in Kazakhstan	February 18, 2021		Almaty, Kazakhstan
	MMA Bushido in Minsk	November 28, 2020		Minsk, Belarus
	Bushido SWAT’78	August 2, 2020	Event Oasis	Kaunas, Lithuania
	Bushido SWAT’77	June 27, 2020	Vilkanastru Dvaras Hotel	Vilkanastrai, Lithuania
	Bushido SWAT’76	February 13, 2020	Žalgiris Arena	Kaunas, Lithuania
	MMA Bushido 78 in Tauragė	December 28, 2019	Bastilija sports complex	Tauragė, Lithuania
	Bushido SWAT’73	June 29, 2019	Alytus Arena	Kaunas, Lithuania
	MMA Bushido 77 in Vilnius	May 3, 2019	Siemens Arena	Vilnius, Lithuania
	MMA Bushido 75 in Tauragė	December 15, 2018	Bastilija sports complex	Tauragė, Lithuania
	Bushido SWAT’72	November 24, 2018	Šiauliai Arena	Šiauliai, Lithuania
	MMA Bushido 74 in Vilnius	May 4, 2018	Siemens Arena	Vilnius, Lithuania
	MMA Bushido 73 in Cork	April 21, 2018	Neptune Stadium	(Republic of Ireland) Cork, Ireland
	MMA Bushido 72 in Šiauliai	November 4, 2017	Šiauliai Arena	Šiauliai, Lithuania
	MMA Bushido 71 in Vilnius	November 19, 2017	Siemens Arena	Vilnius, Lithuania
	Bushido SWAT’64	September 24, 2016	Alytus Arena	Kaunas, Lithuania
	MMA Bushido 51 in Astana	June 8, 2012	Saryarka Velodrome	Astana, Kazakhstan
	Bushido SWAT’62 in Utena	April 29, 2016	Utenos daugiafunkcis sporto centras	Utena, Lithuania
	Bushido SWAT’61	April 15, 2016	Kalnapilio Arena	Panevėžys, Lithuania
	Bushido SWAT’56	February 13, 2016	Akademija Saulė	Šiauliai, Lithuania
	Bushido SWAT’55	December 19, 2015	Laisvalaikio Centre Fortuna	Tauragė, Lithuania
	Bushido SWAT’54	December 4, 2015	Kauno OAZĖ	Kaunas, Lithuania
	Bushido SWAT’52	October 24, 2015	Akademija Saulė	Šiauliai, Lithuania
	Bushido SWAT’50	September 4, 2015	Kauno OAZĖ	Kaunas, Lithuania
	Bushido SWAT’49	May 30, 2015	Night Club Havana	Šiauliai, Lithuania
	Bushido SWAT’48	May 7, 2015	Kauno OAZĖ	Kaunas, Lithuania
	Bushido SWAT’47	April 18, 2015	Alytus Arena	Alytus, Lithuania
	Bushido SWAT’46	February 28, 2015	Kauno OAZĖ	Kaunas, Lithuania
	Bushido SWAT’45	December 20, 2014	Kauno OAZĖ	Kaunas, Lithuania
	Bushido SWAT’44	December 6, 2014	Laisvalaikio Centre Fortuna	Tauragė, Lithuania
	Bushido SWAT’42	May 15, 2014	Kauno OAZĖ	Kaunas, Lithuania
	Bushido SWAT’41	May 10, 2014	Zalgirio Arena Amphitheatre	Kaunas, Lithuania
	Bushido SWAT’40	April 18, 2014	Zalgirio Arena Amphitheatre	Kaunas, Lithuania
	Bushido SWAT’39	March 22, 2014	Kauno OAZĖ	Kaunas, Lithuania
	Bushido SWAT’38	December 12, 2013	Kauno OAZĖ	Kaunas, Lithuania
	Bushido SWAT’37	November 23, 2013	Laisvalaikio Centre Fortuna	Tauragė, Lithuania
	Bushido SWAT’36	May 10, 2013	Kalnapilio Arena	Panevėžys, Lithuania
	Bushido SWAT’35	March 16, 2013	Kalnapilio Arena	Jonava, Lithuania
	Bushido SWAT’34	February 23, 2013	Biržai Ausra	Biržai, Lithuania
	Bushido SWAT’33	February 16, 2013		Pakruojis, Lithuania
	MMA Bushido 53 World Series in London	November 30, 2012	The Coronet	London, United Kingdom
	Bushido SWAT’32	November 24, 2012	Laisvalaikio Centre Fortuna	Tauragė, Lithuania
	Bushido SWAT’31	October 5, 2012		Prienai, Lithuania
	Bushido SWAT’29	April 7, 2012	Šakių JKSC	Šakiai, Lithuania
	Bushido SWAT’28	March 17, 2012		Tauragė, Lithuania
	Bushido SWAT’27	March 16, 2012	Kauno Sport Hall	Kaunas, Lithuania
	MMA Bushido 50 World Series in Almaty	December 21, 2011		Almaty, Kazakhstan
	MMA Bushido 47 in London	November 6, 2011	Troxy	London, United Kingdom
	Bushido SWAT’24	September 23, 2011		Šiauliai, Lithuania
	Bushido SWAT’23	May 21, 2011		Jurbarkas, Lithuania
	Bushido SWAT’18	February 16, 2011	Atzalyno Sports Hall	Pakruojis, Lithuania
	Bushido SWAT’17	September 24, 2010		Marijampolė, Lithuania
	Bushido SWAT’16	June 5, 2010	Voro Fortas	Alytus, Lithuania
	Bushido SWAT’14	February 16, 2010	Pakruojis Sports Center	Pakruojis, Lithuania
	Bushido SWAT’13	September 6, 2009	Combo Club	Kaunas, Lithuania
	Bushido SWAT’12	June 21, 2009	Nese Bank of Entertainment	Vilnius, Lithuania
	Bushido SWAT’8	December 14, 2008	Combo Club	Kaunas, Lithuania
	Bushido SWAT’7	September 27, 2008	Club Šansas	Molėtai, Lithuania
	Bushido SWAT’6	September 20, 2008	Darius and Girėnas	Jurbarkas, Lithuania
	Bushido SWAT’4	February 2, 2008		Lithuania
	Bushido SWAT’2	February 17, 2007	Club Max	Šiauliai, Lithuania

== Champions ==
=== Current champions ===
Weight class	Upper weight limit	Champion	Event	Date	Title defenses
Heavyweight	Unlimited	(Lithuania) Tomas Pakutinskas			
Light heavyweight	93 kg (205.0 lb)	Vacant			
Middleweight	84 kg (185.2 lb)	Vacant			
Welterweight	77 kg (169.8 lb)	Vacant			
Lightweight	70 kg (154.3 lb)	Vacant			
Featherweight	65 kg (143.3 lb)	Vacant			
Bantamweight	60 kg (132.3 lb)	Vacant			

=== MMA Bushido Welterweight Championship ===
Weight limit: 77 kg (169.8 lb)

No.	Name	Event	Date	Defenses
Current	Vacant			
Leisans was stripped of the title 6 April 2023.
	(Latvia) Arturs Leisans def. Vitold Jagelo	KOK 110 Mega Series in Vilnius; Vilnius, Lithuania	March 18, 2023	

== See also ==
- King of Kings
