= List of Romanian television series =

The following is a list of Romanian TV series.

== 1970s ==
=== 1971 ===
- Urmărirea (The chase) - TVR; drama/war

=== 1972 ===
- Cireșarii - TVR; adventure

=== 1973 ===
- Un august în flăcări (An August in flames) - TVR; drama/war
- Pistruiatul (That freckled kid) - TVR; war

=== 1977 ===
- Toate pânzele sus! (Raise the sails!) - TVR; adventure

=== 1979 ===
- Lumini și umbre (Lights and shadows) - TVR (1979-1982); drama

== 1980s ==
=== 1984 ===
- Eroii nu au vârstă (Not too young to be a hero) - TVR; adventure/war
- Racheta albă (White rocket) - TVR; adventure

=== 1986 ===
- Ochii care nu se văd... (What the eyes don't see..) - TVR (1986/1994); drama

== 1990s ==
=== 1993 ===
- Inelul cu briliant (The diamond ring) - TVR; crime

=== 1994 ===
- Călătorie de neuitat (Unforgettable journey) - TVR; adventure

=== 1999 ===
- 1, 2, 3 - Pro TV; sitcom
- Boier Moflea și Vodă - Pro TV (1992-2002); sitcom
- Garcea - Pro TV (1999-2003); sitcom
- Vacanṭa Mare - Pro TV; sitcom

== 2000s ==
=== 2003 ===
- Căsătorie de probă (Trial Marriage) - Acasă; sitcom (2003-2004)
- La bloc (Living in a Block) - Pro TV; sitcom (2002-2008)
- Leana ṣi Costel (Leana and Costel) - Pro TV, Kanal D; sitcom (2003-2012)
- Trăsniți în N.A.T.O. (Crazies in N.A.T.O.) - Prima TV (2003-2009)

=== 2004 ===
- Numai iubirea (Just Love) - Acasă - soap-opera (2004)

=== 2005 ===
- Băieṭi buni (Good Boyz) - Pro TV - action (2005)
- Lacrimi de iubire (Love Tears) - Acasă - soap-opera (2005)
- Păcatele Evei (Eve's Sins) - Acasă; soap-opera (2005-2006)
- Secretul Mariei (Maria's Secret) - Antena 1 (2005-2006)

=== 2006 ===
- Daria, iubirea mea (Daria, My Love) - Acasă; soap-opera (2006)
- Mondenii (The Mondens) - Prima TV - sitcom (2006-2014)
- Iubire ca în filme (Love as in the Movies) - Acasă; soap-opera (2006)
- Om sărac, om bogat (Poor Man, Rich Man) - Pro TV; drama (2006-2007)
- Vocea Inimii/La Voz de Corazon (Heart's Voice) - Antena 1; soap-opera (2006-2007)

=== 2007 ===
- Gipsy Heart (Romanian: Inimă de țigan) - Acasă; (2007)
- Războiul sexelor (War of Genders) - Acasă; sitcom (2007)

=== 2008 ===
- Arestat la domiciliu (Home Arrest) - Pro TV; sitcom (2008)
- Doctor de mame (Mothers and Doctors) - Acasă; drama (2008)
- Îngeraṣii (The Little Angels) - Acasă; sitcom (2008)
- Nimeni nu-i perfect (Nobody's Perfect) - Prima TV - sitcom (2007-2008)
- Regina (The Queen) - spin-off of Gipsy Heart; Acasă; soap-opera (2008)
- Scene de căsnicie (Marriage Scenes) - Antena 1 - sitcom/drama (2008)
- Vine poliṭia! (The Police is coming!) - Pro TV; action (2008)

=== 2009 ===
- State de România (State of Romania) - Acasă - spin-off of Regina (2009)
- Aniela (Aniela) - Acasă - soap opera (2009)

== 2010s ==
=== 2010 ===
- Iubire și onoare (Love and Honor) - Acasă (2010)
- Moștenirea (The Heritage) - Acasă - spin-off of State of Romania (2010)
- Narcisa sălbatică (Wild Narcisa) - Antena 1 (2010-2011)

=== 2011 ===
- Eu, Tu, El și Ea (Me, You, Him and Her) - Prima TV; sitcom (2011)
- În derivă - HBO Romania (2010-2013)
- Pariu cu viața - ProTV (2011-2013)
- Tanti Florica - ProTV (2012-2013)

=== 2012 ===
- Las Fierbinṭi - ProTV (2012-present)
- Spitalul de demență - ProTV (2012-2013)

=== 2013 ===
- Rămâi cu mine - HBO Romania (2013-2014)

=== 2014 ===
- Umbre - HBO Romania (2014)
- O nouă viaṭă - Acasă (2014)
- O săptămână nebună - Pro TV (2014)
- Fetele lu' dom' profesor - Kanal D (2014-2018)

=== 2015 ===
- Lecții de viață - Pro TV (2015-present)
- Camera Cafe - Antena 1; comedy (2015)

=== 2016 ===
- Atletico Textila - Pro TV; comedy (2016-2017)
- Deschide ochii - Pro TV; drama (2016)
- Valea Mută - HBO Romania (2016)
- Băieți de oraș - Antena 1 (2016-2018)

=== 2017 ===
- Ai noștri - Pro TV; comedy (2017)
- Când mama nu-i acasă - Happy Channel; drama (2017)
- O grămadă de caramele - Happy Channel; drama (2017)

=== 2018 ===
- Fructul oprit - Antena 1; drama (2018-2019)
- Triplusec - Pro TV; comedy (2018)
- Hackerville - HBO Romania (2018)
- Primăverii - TVR2; comedy (2018-2019)

=== 2019 ===
- Vlad - Pro TV; drama (2019-2021)
- Liber ca pasărea cerului - Antena 1; comedy (2019)
- Sacrificiul - Antena 1; drama (2019-2020)
- Mangaliṭa - Antena 1; comedy (2019-2020)

== 2020s ==
=== 2020 ===
- Videochat - PRO TV; comedy (2020)
- Bani negri (pentru zile albe) - HBO Romania; action, comedy (2020)

=== 2021 ===
- Adela - Antena 1; drama, action (2021-2022)
- Povești de familie - Antena 1; drama, family (2021-2022)
- Secretele Președintelui - Prima TV; comedy (2021-present)

=== 2022 ===
- Ruxx - HBO Max; drama (2022)
- Strada Speranței - Kanal D; comedy (2022)
- Clanul - PRO TV; action, thriller, drama (2022-2024)
- Pup-o, mă! Înfuntarea bacilor - Prima TV; comedy (2022)

=== 2023 ===
- Lia – soția soțului meu - Antena 1; drama (2023-2024)
- Spy/Master - HBO Romania; action, drama, thriller (2023)
- Lasă-mă, îmi place! Camera 609 - Antena 1; comedy, romance (2023-2024)
- Groapa - Voyo; action, drama (2023-2025)
- Bravo, tată! - Antena 1; comedy (2023-2024)

=== 2024 ===
- Brigada Nimic - PRO TV - comedy, action (2024)
- Tătuțu' - Voyo - action, thriller, drama (2024-2026)
- Iubire cu parfum de lavandă - Antena 1; - drama (2024-2025)
- Scara B - PRO TV - comedy (2024)
