= Mireasă pentru fiul meu =

Romanian reality television show

- Created by: Levent Altinay
- Presented by: Mirela Vaida
- Country of origin: Romania
- Original language: Romanian
- No. of seasons: 6
- No. of episodes: 1,005

Production
- Running time: 240–300 minutes
- Production company: Sinevizyon TV Production

Original release
- Network: Antena 1
- Release: 29 August 2011 – 3 March 2017

Mireasă pentru fiul meu (literally 'A bride for my son') is a Romanian reality matrimonial show produced by Sinevizyon TV Production. The first series started on 29 August 2011 and it is broadcast by Antena 1 channel in Romania. The competition is hosted by singer and TV host Mirela Boureanu Vaida. The show is similar to Noră pentru mama which was broadcast by Kanal D Romania.

== Format ==
The premise of the show is that there is a group of people (girls, boys and boys' moms) living together in a large, usually specially constructed house. During their time in the house they are isolated from the outside world and are not aware of outside events. Contestants are continuously monitored by in-house television cameras as well as personal audio microphones during their stay. Each series lasts for about 1 year, with 41–45 contestants entering the house to marry.

=== Launch day ===
On the launch Day, anywhere from upwards of approximately 28 contestants entered the Mireasă pentru fiul meu house. In the first season, contestants entered the house in the launch night.

=== Contestants ===
In every season the girls and boys, together with their mothers, grandmothers, (In season 2 Florin entered in the competition with his grandmother Maria and in season 3 Laurențiu entered in the competition with grandmother Maria) stepmothers, (In season 2 Răzvan entered in the competition with his stepmother Elena) aunts (In season 1 Ionuț entered in the competition with his aunt Mariana, but her aunt was replaced by her mother, Niculina in final weeks) or single entered in the Mireasă pentru fiul meu house on the Launch Day. In the first two weeks the boys and girls stay in different houses, the boys, in the boys' house and the girls, in the girls' house with the boys' mothers.

=== Weekly bride and weekly mother ===
Every week one girls and one mother who received the most public votes are declared the weekly bride and the weekly mother. They can be saved from elimination. Also the weekly mother can save his son from elimination.

=== Nomination and elimination ===
Almost every week, the contestants (except boys) make nominations. In some weeks the mothers nominate one, two or three girls and in the others weeks the girls nominate one or two boys with their mothers. The contestants who received the most nominations are up for elimination during that week. The contestant who received the fewest votes from the public is eliminated from the competition.

=== Isolation ===
Mireasă pentru fiul meu contestants are isolated in the house, without access to television, radio or the Internet; they are not permitted routine communication with the outside world. This was an important issue for most earlier series of the show. In more-recent series, contestants are occasionally allowed to view televised events (usually as a reward for winning at a task). Despite the contestants isolation, some contestants are occasionally allowed to leave the house as part of tasks. Contestants are permitted to leave the house in an emergency.

=== Live final and the winners ===
At the beginning of the Live Final, a small number of contestants remained in the house (anywhere from 7 to 11) after surviving numerous eliminations. The public were asked to vote for their favourite surviving couple (bride and bridegroom with bridegroom's mother called mother-in-low) to win a cash prize and be crowned the winners of Mireasă pentru fiul meu. Voting lines were suspended at intervals during the show to reveal runners-up. Contestants finishing lower than third place, were eliminated without delay and interviewed by the presenter. Once the second runners-up had been revealed, the show took a break, before returning half an hour later to allow the third place contestants to be evicted and interviewed. The winner was then announced. The first runners-up then left the house and was interviewed, followed by the winners, who were usually treated and greeted to a cheering crowd and a firework display before their interview. In Live Final some couples can marriages.

== Series details ==
Series	Launch date	Finale date	Days	Weeks	Episodes	Contestants	Winners	International Destinations
1	29 August 2011	25 August 2012	351	50	497	41	Edina & Adrian with Mrs. Mărioara	Austria; Turkey
2	1 September 2012	24 August 2013	368	51	508	45	Lorena & George with Mrs. Cristina	Bulgaria; Turkey
3	31 August 2013	30 August 2014	365	53	TBA	41	Contantina & Raymond	Turkey

- On 25 August 2012, Adrian & Edina were the first winners of the series. However, Adrian & Edina didn't receive the big prize because they weren't lovers. The prize split between all the finalists of the season.
- On 24 August 2013, George & Lorena were declared the second winners of the series. In Live Final George and Lorena were married. Lorena, the charismatic bride of season 2, established a stunning record. She occupied 1st place 8 consecutive months, a unique performance for this show.

== Seasons ==
=== Season 1 (2011) ===
The debut season started airing on 29 August 2011 and ended on 25 August 2012. In the grand final Ionuț and Monica was married. Edina and Adrian with Mrs. Mărioara was declared the winners of the competition.

=== Season 2 (2012) ===
The debut season started airing on 1 September 2012 and ended on 24 August 2013. In the grand final Alin & Andreea and George & Lorena were married. The winners of the second season were Lorena and George with Mrs. Cristina.

=== Season 3 (2013) ===
The debut season started airing on 29 August 2013 and ended on 30 August 2014. The winner of the third season were Costantina and Raymond.

=== Season 4 (2014) ===
The debut season started airing on 6 September 2014 and ended on 29 August 2015. The winners of Season 4 were Elly and Cristian.

=== Season 5 (2015) ===
The debut season started airing on 5 September 2015. The winners of Season 5 were Adriana si Valentin

== History ==
The original series started in February 2007 and it was broadcast by Kanal D channel in Romania. The series was called Noră pentru mama (literally "Daughter-in-law for my mother") and that show had five seasons. Noră pentru mama was presented by TV host Gabriela Cristea. In 2011, after the end of the fifth season Antena 1 adopted this format, releasing a new series called Mireasă pentru fiul meu presented by Mirela Boureanu Vaida.
