= List of English words of Etruscan origin =

This is a list of English words that may be of Etruscan origin, and were borrowed through Latin, often via French. The Etruscan origin of most of these words is disputed, and some may be of Indo-European or other origin. The question is made more complex by the fact that the Etruscans borrowed many Greek words in modified form. Typically if a Latin word has an unknown, uncertain or disputed origin, it is considered a possible candidate for deriving in whole or in part from an Etruscan word; however, native Etruscan must then be distinguished from Greek. If no Etruscan word is clearly identifiable sometimes an attempt is made to reconstruct one. Etruscan derivations therefore are highly variable in probability; that is, some are highly speculative and others more likely.

== List ==
ace
from Middle English aas, from Old French as, from Latin as, "a whole, a unit, copper coin", possibly Etruscan. As was a Roman coin and was also a unit of weight equal to about one troy pound.
antenna
from antenna < antemna, "yard-arm, sail". Possibly Etruscan *antithemna > *ant(th)emna from Greek ἀνατιθέμενος anatithémenos, something set up.
Anthony
from Latin Antōnius, a Roman gens claimed by Marcus Antonius to descend from Ἄντων (Ántōn), a son of Heracles, but the gens is probably Etruscan in origin, most likely derived from Ani, the Etruscan god of the sky. Previous claims asserted an Ancient Greek (compare ἄνθος ánthos, “flower” or ἄνθρωπος, "man, human") origin with an unetymological excrescent -h- but this remains dubious.
April
Latin aprilis probably from Etruscan form apera- (found the Tabula Capuana, a ritual calendar line 8--the next section mentions May anpile), which form may come from Greek Aphrodite. There is also a gloss that equates Etruscan <c>Abreus with Latin Aprilis mensis.
arena
from arēna "arena" < harēna, "arena, sand" < archaic hasēna < Sabine fasēna, unknown Etruscan word as the basis for fas- with Etruscan ending -ēna.
atrium
From Latin atrium which both Breyer and Bonfante consider to be a likely loan from Etruscan (along with other architectural terms such as fenestra "window" and cella "chamber"). But both Watkins and de Vaan trace it back to Proto-Indo-European (though they disagree on the exact root).
autumn
from autumnus "autumn". Just as Etruscan veltha, an earth god, appears as Latin Vola or Olta and is in Voltumna and Vertumnus, so the parallel construction autumnus ought to come from Etruscan autu-, related to avil, "year": *av(i)-to-m(e)nos, with loss of the l. There are some names with both l and t: avlethaium, authnal, avtle, and so on, which appear related to autu or auta in Venetic, the idea being that autumn signifies the passing of the year.
belt
from balteus, "sword belt." The sole connection between this word and Etruscan is a statement by Marcus Terentius Varro that it was of Etruscan origin. All else is speculation.
catamite
Latin, from Etruscan catmite, from the Ancient Greek Ganymede, cupbearer to Zeus. Bonfante and most others accept this etymology.
ceremony
possibly Etruscan or possibly referring to Etruscan rites performed at Caere.
defenestration, fenestra
Both Bonfante and Whatmough accept the probability that Latin fenestra was a loan from a derivative of Etruscan fnes-. Some of the other reasonably certain loans also deal with elements of architecture, for example atrium and cella.
element
from elementum, 'letter'.
histrionic
from histrionicus, from histrio, "actor".
letter
from Old French lettre, from Latin littera, which may have derived, via Etruscan, from the Greek "διφθέρα" (writing tablet).
mantissa
market
military
Etruscan or perhaps related to Greek homilos, "assembled crowd" (compare homily).
mundane
from mundus, 'earth', from munth, 'land'.
mutule
palace, palate, palatine
One of the seven hills of Rome. Either from Latin palus "stake" or the Etruscan shepherd goddess Pales.
people
From Latin populus by way of Old French peuple, possibly of Etruscan origin. After a lengthy discussion, Whatmough concludes that it is not completely certain that Latin populus is an Etruscan loanword, but that such an etymology is "satisfactory at the morphological and phonological levels."
person
from Middle English persone, from Old French persone, from Latin persona, "mask", probably from Etruscan phersu, "mask". Another sources, however, links the Etruscan word as a derivative of Greek πρὀσωπον prosōpon, "mask".
Rome
from 'Ruma', the name of one of the Etruscan tribes, or 'Rumon', which was what the Etruscans called the Tiber River, possibly of Etruscan origin as ruma was one of the Etruscan gentes, from rum, “teat”.
satellite
from Latin satelles, meaning "bodyguard, attendant", perhaps from Etruscan satnal. Bonfante, otherwise quite skeptical of many proposed loans, calls it "quite likely" that Latin satteles is from Etruscan. Whatmough considers Latin satteles "as one of our securest Etruscan loans in Latin."
scurrilous
Serge (first name)
serve
the word serve derives from Latin servire ('to serve') and servus ('a slave'), which have sometimes been thought to derive from Etruscan. However, a detailed analysis has preferred an Indo-European etymology for the Latin word.
spurious
From Latin spurius "born out of wedlock, illegitimate" from Etruscan spur-al "of the city" because, as Pisani proposed, children not claimed by their fathers were considered to belong to the city. Whatmough, however, rejects Pisani's claim, both because of the late attestation of the Latin term, but also because the Etruscan root spur is now seen as meaning "community" not "city"; and furthermore, in any case, the form that would have to be the immediate predecessor of Latin spurius would have to be Etruscan spurie which may have a different meaning, and in one instance seems to be the name of a person with a named father.
triumph
From Old Latin triumpus, probably a loan word via Etruscan from Greek thriambos, a hymn to Dionysus.
vernacular
from vernaculus, 'domestic', from verna, 'a native slave'.
viburnum
from Latin viburnum, likely Etruscan in origin. Compare laburnum, alaternus, basterna, lacerna, santerna, pincerna, clarnus, all strongly suspected to be derived from Etruscan or related languages.

== Bibliography ==
- Breyer, Gertraud (1993). Etruskisches Sprachgut im Lateinischen unter Ausschluss des spezifisch onomastischen Bereiches (in German). Peeters Publishers. ISBN 9068313355. 9789068313352.
- Whatmough, M. Studies of Etruscan Loanwords in Latin PhD dissertation. University College London. 2007. https://discovery.ucl.ac.uk/id/eprint/10121058/1/Studies_in_the_Etruscan_loanwo.pdf
- Bonfante, G. "Etruscan Words in Latin" Word 36.3. 1985. pp. 203–210 https://www.tandfonline.com/doi/pdf/10.1080/00437956.1985.11435872?needAccess=true
- de Vaan, M. Etymological Dictionary of Latin and the other Italic Languages (Leiden Indo-European Etymological Dictionary Series, Volume: 7), 2011.

== See also ==
- Lists of English words of international origin
