= Karlos Xavier =

Ecuadorian-Italian singer-songwriter

Karlos Xavier, pseudonym of Carlos Xavier Córdova Figueroa (born 31 July 1988 in Esmeraldas), is an Ecuadorian singer-songwriter, and a figure in Latin American music. Throughout his career, he has achieved commercial success in Europe, earning certifications such as a Gold Record in Italy.

== Biography ==
Born in 1988 in Esmeraldas, Ecuador, he demonstrated a strong interest in music from early childhood, starting to perform and interpret songs from the Latin American repertoire in 1999. By the age of fifteen, he was composing his first original tracks.

In 2006, at the age of 17, he moved to Milan, Italy, to reunite with his mother who had emigrated to Europe. Later settling in the province of Pavia, he established an extensive network of collaborations with musicians from various regions of Latin America, refining his style and blending traditional and contemporary sounds. In July 2021, he officially obtained Italian citizenship.

== Career ==
Writing 95% of his own lyrics, he composes and performs his tracks in both Spanish and Italian, also initiating collaborations with Italian artists such as Lorenzo Luraca, Mauro Nardi.

During his live career, he has shared the stage with major international Latin music figures. In Esmeraldas, he performed alongside American bachata star Toby Love. While in Milan, he shared the stage with international artists, most notably the Puerto Rican romantic salsa singer Nino Segarra. He has been a regular performer at major industry events, appearing multiple times at the Milano Latin Festival.

In the media sphere, the artist has expanded his presence by participating in major festivals and radio/TV broadcasts across both Europe and Latin America: In 2023, he participated in the official selections and the academy & Casting phases of Una voce per San Marino 2023, the music festival used to select the representative for the Republic of San Marino at the Eurovision Song Contest. Furthermore, he participated in performances and promotional activities at Casa Sanremo, the official hospitality hub of the Sanremo Music Festival.

In Italy, he has made numerous television appearances on national networks and prominent regional broadcasters, showcasing his musical projects on Rai 2, Rai 3, Canale Italia, Telelombardia, Antenna 3 and La 8 (Teleottanta).

In Latin America, the promotion of his studio works and tours has led him to be featured on multiple national television channels and network media outlets in both Ecuador and Colombia.

In his studio work, the artist has distinguished himself through numerous national and international artistic partnerships. The song Canto a mi país, entirely written and composed by Karlos Xavier and dedicated to migrants, features the official collaboration of the brothers Danilo Parra, La Viví Parra and José Daniel Parra (belonging to one of the most prominent artistic families in Ecuador), along with other figures from the Ecuadorian music scene like Paulina Calahorrano, GN El Gato Negro and Jim Marlon.

On the track No me enseñaste a olvidar, he officially collaborated with musician and composer El Negro José. Within the album Más fuerte, he handled the composition, arrangement and rewriting into a salsa version of the song Dame veneno, performed in collaboration with singer Luiggy Luiggy Hernandez and registered under the catalog of Farfallina Edizioni. For the summer single Mamyta, released by the Farfallina Edizioni Musicali label, he collaborated on songwriting and composition with musicians Quirico Bacciu and Mirko Putzu, promoting the project on Italian national television (Canale Italia) alongside presenter and artist Giuseppe Spinelli (known as Giuseppe Sp).

Throughout his career, he has undertaken several promotional tours in Ecuador, Colombia, Peru and Italy.

== Partial discography ==
=== Studio albums ===
- 2014 – Karlos Xavier
- 2016 – Regálame una Sonrisa
- 2019 – Loca
- 2021 – Amore
- 2023 – Más fuerte
- 2025 – Bailar

=== Singles and EPs ===
- 2009 – Tocar tu cuerpo (EP)
- 2013 – Canto a mi país (feat. Danilo Parra, La Viví Parra, José Daniel Parra)
- 2013 – No me enseñaste a olvidar (feat. El Negro José)
- 2014 – Pedacito de cielo.
- 2015 – Aruñando tu piel
- 2015 – Te amo
- 2020 – Mamyta (feat. Mirko Putzu & Quirico Bacciu)
- 2023 – Dame veneno (feat. Luiggy Luiggy Hernandez)

== See also ==
- Latin American music
- Milano Latin Festival
- Una voce per San Marino 2023
