= Antena 2 =

Antena 2 may refer to:

- Antena 2 (Romania), a Romanian TV channel
- Antena 2 (Portugal), a Portuguese radio station
- Antena 2 (Colombia), a radio station operated by RCN Radio
