= Jurnalul Național =

Romanian newspaper

Jurnalul Național is a Romanian newspaper, part of the INTACT Media Group led by Dan Voiculescu, which also includes the popular television station Antena 1. The newspaper was launched in 1993. Its headquarters is in Bucharest.

The newspaper had a circulation of 30,000 copies, one of the highest circulation of any newspaper in Romania.
