= Silviu Prigoană =

Romanian politician (1963–2024)

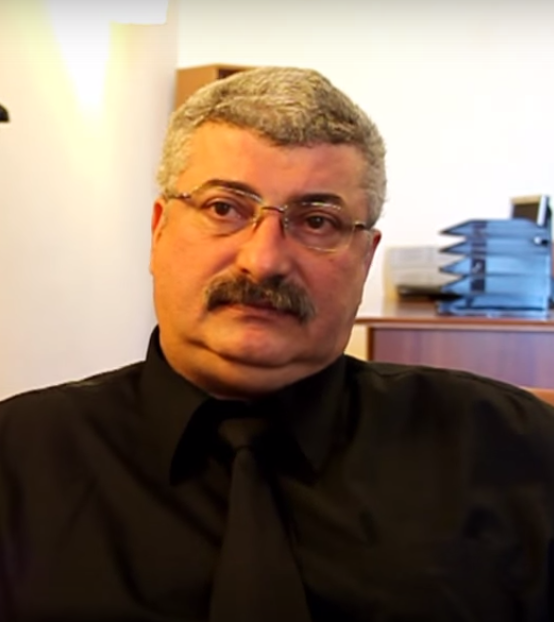
- Prigoană in 2012

Member of the Chamber of Deputies of Romania
- In office December 2008 – December 2012
- Constituency: 42 – Bucharest – Electoral College No. 15

Personal details
- Born: 22 December 1963 Gherla, Cluj Region, Romania
- Died: 12 November 2024 (aged 60) Șimon, Bran, Brașov County, Romania
- Party: Democratic Liberal Party (until 2012); Independent (since 2012)
- Spouse(s): Adriana Bahmuțeanu (div.); Viorica Prigoană (former)
- Children: 4
- Parent(s): Vasile Prigoană; Maria Prigoană

Vasile-Silviu Prigoană (22 December 1963 – 12 November 2024) was a Romanian businessman and politician.

== Life and career ==
Prigoană owned 60% of Rosal Grup, a waste collection company which services Bucharest's Sector 3, Cluj-Napoca, Suceava, and Baia Mare.

In December 2008, he became a member of the Romanian Chamber of Deputies, serving for four years. He was a member of the Democratic Liberal Party (PDL) until September 2012, shortly before his term expired.

Apart from his waste collection company, Prigoană is known for founding the first Romanian news television, Realitatea TV, the first sports channel based in Romania, TV Sport (later sold to Central European Media Enterprises, becoming Sport.ro), and two other music channels: the first with emphasis on Romanian traditional music, Etno TV, and the other known for promoting Manele music, Taraf TV.

His first wife, Viorica, died in 1994 at age 30. He was married to Adriana Bahmuțeanu with whom he had a tumultuous relationship that culminated with their fourth marriage in May 2009. The couple have two children together, along with two sons from his first marriage, Honorius-Adrian and Silvius.

Prigoană died from a heart attack in Bran, Brașov, on 12 November 2024, at the age of 60. He was buried at the Evangelical Lutheran Cemetery in Bucharest.
