= Stația experimentală de televiziune București =

- The station identification card
- Type: Television station
- Country: Romanian People's Republic
- First air date: 21 August 1955
- Availability: Romania
- Headquarters: Calea Dudești 101 (Vitan Post Office)
- Broadcast area: Bucharest
- Dissolved: 31 December 1956
- Picture format: analog, 320 lines
- Language: Romanian
- Replaced by: Televiziunea Română

Stația experimentală de televiziune București (The experimental TV station in Bucharest), was the first television service in Romania. It was on the air from 21 August 1955, until it was replaced by the regular television service on 31 December 1956.

== History ==
In August 1954, a group of scientists working in the research lab of the Ministry of Posts and Telecommunications began developing an experimental television station, using Soviet documentation and Soviet and Romanian parts. The group consisted of engineers Alexandru Spătaru, Grigore Antonescu, Octav Gheorghiu, Adrian Gheron, Nicolae Luncescu, Gheorghe Răducanu and technicians Traian Anghel, Simion Grigorescu and Ștefan Stanef. In June 1955 they finished the 1 kW emitter, and the antenna was installed on top of the Post Office in Vitan neighborhood.

The emitter would broadcast an analog television signal at 49.75 MHz and the sound signal at 56.25 MHz, the images consisting of 320 lines at 50 Hz. After a while, its power increased to 2 kW, in order to cover the entire area of Bucharest. Since the experimental station had just a telecine equipment, it was only able to broadcast programs previously recorded on film

The station began broadcasting on the evening of 21 August 1955, at 8 PM, by showing the newsreels, the "Bear Cubs" cartoon, the "Soviet Asia" documentary film and other programs. These could be seen publicly, on a handful of Soviet television sets installed in various shops and leisure places in Bucharest.

The broadcast continued intermittently, showing movies, documentaries, cartoons and newsreels until 31 December 1956, when the regular television station began emitting.

== See also ==
- Television in Romania
