= Antena 3 =

Antena 3 may refer to:

- RTP Antena 3 (Portugal), a Portuguese radio station owned by Rádio e Televisão de Portugal
- Antena 3 CNN (Romania), a Romanian television channel owned by Intact Media Group
- Antena 3 (Spain), a Spanish television channel
  - Antena 3 Canarias, a defunct television channel that broadcasts to the Canary Islands
  - Antena 3 Noticias, a news program
  - Antena 3 Radio, a defunct Spanish radio station

== See also ==
- Antenna 3 (disambiguation)
- 3 Antena
