= Mireasă pentru fiul meu season 3 =

Mireasă pentru fiul meu
- Season 3
- No. of episodes: TBA

Release
- Original network: Antena 1
- Original release: 31 August 2013 – 30 August 2014

Mireasă pentru fiul meu 3 is the third season of the Romanian Antena 1 competitive reality matrimonial show, which premiered on August 31, 2013. In the Launch Day 15 girls, 11 boys and 5 mothers entered the competition, featuring a total of 31 contestants, the largest amount for any season at the time.

The premise of the series remained largely unchanged from previous editions of the series, in which a group of contestants compete to win the big prize and to marry . In every week one girl and one mother who received the most public votes are declared the weekly girl winner and the weekly mother winner. They can be saved from elimination. Also the weekly mother can save his son from elimination. A Contestant can be expelled from the show for breaking rules, such as discussing nominations when not permitted.

== Contestants ==
On Day 1, thirty-one contestants entered the Mireasă pentru fiul meu house. Notable new contestants this season include the Dansez pentru tine star Grigore Moldovan and Raymond Untu who is the brother of former contestant of season 2 Vanessa Untu.

=== Boys & Girls ===
Name	Age on entry	Hometown	Occupation	Has/had couple
Alin Urdă	26	Bacău	Teacher	Yes, with Iulia (but split)
Andrei Rotaru	27	(Italy) Florence	Tattoo artist	Yes, with Cristina
Andreea Mihalache	21	Ploiești	Secretary	
Claudia Grigore	22	Bucharest	Student	Yes, with Sorin
Constantina Căldăraru	24	Craiova	Waiter	Yes, with Raymond
Corina Mocanu	20	Bacău	Student	Yes, with Traian
Cristina Petre	21	Bucharest	Model	Yes, with Andrei
Denisa	20	Pitești	Waiter	
Diana Luca	23	Bucharest	Student	Yes, with Robert (but split)
Edit Mărtinaș	23	Deva	Cashier	Yes, with George (but split)
Gabriel "Gabi" Botez	26	Bucharest	Scullion	Yes, with Cristina (but split)
Gabriel Marin	25	Pitești	Manager	
George Mihai	22	Prahova	Chef	Yes, with Edit (but split)
Gina Trancă	24	Timișoara	Economist	
Grigore Moldovan	25	Bucharest	Dancer	Yes, with Mariana
Ioana Ghenea	26	(Belgium) Brussels	Accountant	
Iuliana "Iulia" Dima	22	Bucharest	Student	Yes, with Alin (but split)
Laurențiu Marius	20	Galați	Promoter	Yes, with Marianita
Mariana	22	Buzău	Cashier	Yes, with Grigore
Marianita Cochiorca	22	Bucharest	Student	Yes, with Laurențiu
Oana Obreja	25	Bacău	Governess	Yes, with Laur
Ramona Micu	28	(Italy) Roma	Fashion stylist	
Raymond Untu	22	Cristian	Manager	Yes, with Constantina
Robert Iosif	29	Bucharest	Barman and waiter	Yes, with Diana (but split)
Sorin Ciosici	26	Timișoara	Dentist and Male model	Yes, with Claudia
Traian Enea	22	(Spain) Toledo	Male model	Yes, with Corina

=== Mothers ===
Name	Age on entry	Hometown	Occupation	Son/grandson
Daniela Urdă	48	Bacău	Manager	Alin's mom
Elena Marin	55	Pitești	Housewife	Gabriel's mom
Iuliana Enea	45	(Spain) Toledo	Chef	Traian's mom
Maria Dima	60	Galați	Pharmacist	Laurențiu's grandmother
Virginia Mosli	41	Argeș	Maid	George's mother

== Season summary ==
In the first part of Day 1, Traian, Alin, George, Laurențiu and Gabriel entered in competition with their mothers, Mrs. Iuliana, Mrs. Daniela, Mrs. Virginia, Mrs. Maria respectively Mrs. Elena, while Raymond, Gabi, Robert, Andrei, Sorin and Grigore entered in competition without their mothers. In the second part of Day 1 fifteen girls entered in the competition. Andreea entered in house with her dog "Tița". As in any season boys and girls will stay in different houses and they not seen in the first week. In girls house Gina said that she don't had a boyfriend. On Day 4 for the first time in this season all girls were in boys house, while boys were in girls house. After visit Mrs. Daniela upset Mariana, Constantina, Iuia, Claudia, Diana, Ioana and Oana because they told that they want to meet with Traian. On Day 5 Mrs. Elena was unhappy with her standing in the competition and due to conflict with Mrs. Maria, Elena considered quitting. Later, Elena decided to remain for her son. On Day 6 boys cooked cakes for girls. On Day 6 Andreea's dog returned home. The end of the day contestants had a blind date, one boy met each girls and they talked but they don't saw. Boys chose two girls and girls choose two boys, if a boy chooses a girl and that girl chooses that boy, they go on a date. After blind date Traian and Corina, Sorin and Ioana, George and Edit, Robert with Ramona and Diana go on a dates. Andrei is only boy who was not chosen by girls because of his jokes. After date George told Edit that he loved her.

On Day 7 Corina won the public votes and she became Weekly bride. Constantina was runner-up followed by Marianita in third place. Also Mrs. Iuliana won the public votes and she became Weekly mother. On Day 8 Corina, Constantina and Marianita were in boys house and Traian was in girls house because he was the son of Weekly mother. After visti Traian said that Corina is his favourite girl. Following these events, Andrei and Laurențiu formed the first alliance of the season. In girls house Claudia, Andreea, Diana and Cristina formed the second alliance of the season. On Day 10 Mrs. Virginia accused Mrs. Iuliana as she manipulated all girls. Virginia said that Iuliana praised very much her son. Iuliana denied immediately. On Day 14 Constantina said that Traian is her favourite boy.

== Top contestants per week ==
	Week 2	Week 3	Week 4	Week 5	Week 6	Week 7	Week 8	Week 9	Week 10	Week 11	Week 12	Week 13	Week 14	Week 15	Week 16	Week 17	Week 18	Week 19	Week 20	Week 21	Week 22	Week 23	Week 24	Week 25	Week 26	Week 27	Week 28	Week 29	Week 30	Week 31	Week 32	Week 33	Week 34	Week 35	Week 36	Week 37	Week 38	Week 39	Week 40	Week 41	Week 42	Week 43	Week 44	Week 45	Week 46	Week 47	Week 48	Week 49 alexandra	Week 50	Week 51
In the Top	Mrs. Iuliana, Corina, Constantina, Marianita	Andrei, Mrs. Iuliana, Constantina, Mrs. Maria,	Andrei, Constantina	Constantina, Mrs. Maria																																														

- On Week 2 Mrs. Iuliana was Weekly mother (60.6%). Corina was Weekly bride (26.5%), Constantina was runner-up (20.5%) and Marianita was in third place (12%).

== Voting table ==
A record of the votes cast, stored in a voting-table, shows how each contestant voted to eliminations throughout his or her time in the house.

#	Week 2	Week 3	Week 4	Week 5	Week 6	Week 7	Week 8	Week 9	Week 10	Week 11	Week 12	Week 13	Week 14	Week 15	Week 16	Week 17	Week 18	Week 19	Week 20	Week 21	Week 22	Week 23	Week 24	Week 25	Week 26	Week 27	Week 28	Week 29	Week 30	Week 31	Week 32	Week 33	Week 34	Week 35	Week 36	Week 37	Week 38	Week 39	Week 40	Week 41	Week 42	Week 43	Week 44	Week 45	Week 46	Week 47	Week 48	Week 49	Week 50	Week 51	Elimination votes received
Weekly bride	Corina	Constantina	Constantina	Constantina																																															
Weekly mother	Mrs. Iuliana	Mrs. Iuliana	(none)	Mrs. Maria																																															
Weekly groom	(none)		Andrei	(none)																																															
Nominated	(none)			Ramona, Denisa, Andreea, Oana																																															
Alin & Mrs. Daniela	No nominations	No nominations	No nominations	Not eligible																																															
Alin & Mrs. Daniela	No nominations	No nominations	No nominations	Ramona, Denisa																																															
Andrei	No nominations	No nominations'	Weekly groon	Not eligible																																															
Andreea	No nominations	No nominations	No nominations	Nominated																																															1
Claudia	No nominations	No nominations	No nominations	Not eligible																																															
Constantina	No nominations	Weekly bride	Weekly bride	Weekly bride																																															
Corina	Weekly bride	No nominations	No nominations	Not eligible																																															
Cristina	No nominations	No nominations	No nominations	Not eligible																																															
Denisa	No nominations	No nominations	No nominations	Nominated																																															3
Diana	No nominations	No nominations	No nominations	Not eligible																																															
Edit	No nominations	No nominations	No nominations	Not eligible																																															
Gabi	No nominations	No nominations	No nominations	Not eligible																																															
Gabriel & Mrs. Elena	No nominations	No nominations	No nominations	Not eligible																																															
Gabriel & Mrs. Elena	No nominations	No nominations	No nominations	Ramona, Denisa																																															
George & Mrs. Virginia	No nominations	No nominations	No nominations	Not eligible																																															
George & Mrs. Virginia	No nominations	No nominations	No nominations	Ramona, Denisa																																															
Gina	No nominations	No nominations	No nominations	Not eligible																																															
Grigore	No nominations	No nominations	No nominations	Not eligible																																															
Ioana	No nominations	No nominations	No nominations	Not eligible																																															
Iulia	No nominations	No nominations	No nominations	Not eligible																																															
Laurențiu & Mrs. Maria	No nominations	No nominations	No nominations	Not eligible																																															
Laurențiu & Mrs. Maria	No nominations	No nominations	No nominations	Andreea, Ramona																																															
Mariana	No nominations	No nominations	No nominations	Not eligible																																															
Marianita	No nominations	No nominations	No nominations	Not eligible																																															
Oana	No nominations	No nominations	No nominations	Nominated																																															1
Ramona	No nominations	No nominations	No nominations	Nominated																																															5
Raymond	No nominations	No nominations	No nominations	Not eligible																																															
Robert	No nominations	No nominations	No nominations	Not eligible																																															
Sorin	No nominations	No nominations	No nominations	Not eligible																																															
Traian & Mrs. Iuliana	No nominations	No nominations	No nominations	Not eligible																																															
Traian & Mrs. Iuliana	Weekly mother	Weekly mother	No nominations	Oana, Ramona																																															
Notes	1																																																		
Evicted	(none)																																																		

=== Notes ===
- ^Note 1 : There were no nominations in Week 2, Week 3 and Week 4.

== Reception ==
=== Ratings ===
The series premiered on August 31, 2013 to a 5.0 rating .

=== Viewing figures ===
Ep	Date	Timeslot	Romania			Rank (Day)	Source
Ep	Date	Timeslot	Average (thousands)	Share (%)	Rating (thousands)	Rank (Day)	Source
1 & 2 (Premiere)	Saturday, August 31	14:00-16:00 pm	529	19%	5,0	2	
1 & 2 (Premiere)	Saturday, August 31	17:00-19:00 pm	461	18.9%	4,4	2	
3	Monday, September 2	12:00-13:00 pm					
4	Monday, September 2	14:00-16:00 pm					
5	Tuesday, September 3	12:00-13:00 pm					
6	Tuesday, September 3	14:00-16:00 pm					
7	Wednesday, September 4	12:00-13:00 pm					
8	Wednesday, September 4	14:00-16:00 pm					
9	Thursday, September 5	12:00-13:00 pm					
10	Thursday, September 5	14:00-16:00 pm					
11	Friday, September 6	12:00-13:00 pm					
12	Friday, September 6	14:00-16:00 pm					
