= Antena Internațional =

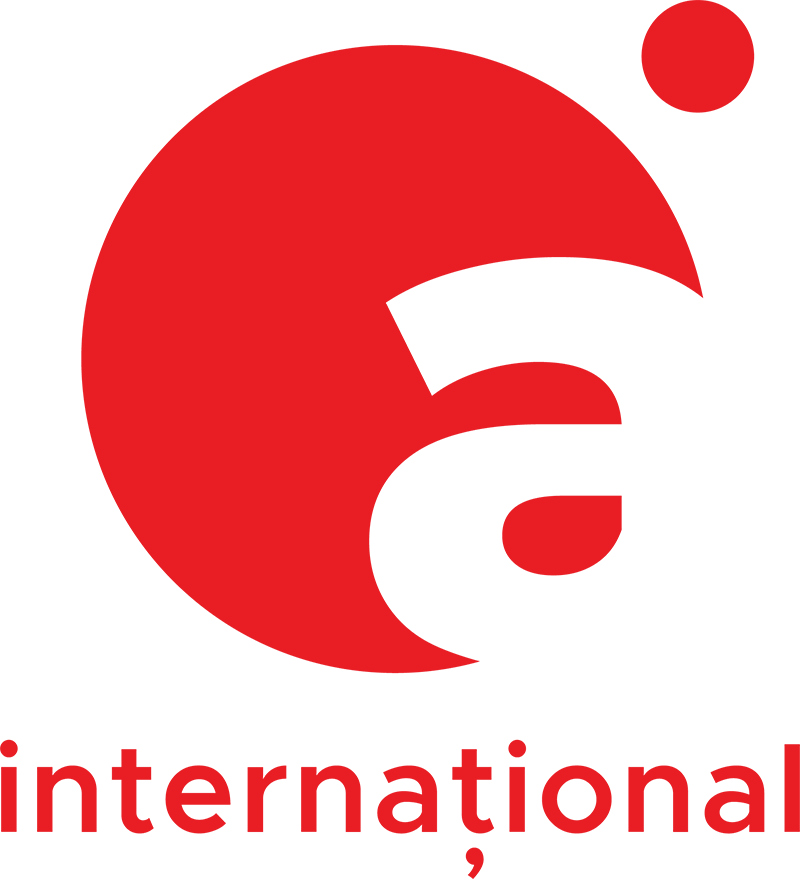
- Country: Romania
- Broadcast area: Europe; Canada; United States
- Network: Antena TV Group

Programming
- Picture format: 1080i HDTV (downscaled to 576i for the SDTV feed)

Ownership
- Owner: Intact Media Group
- Sister channels: Antena 1 Antena Stars; Antena 3 CNN; Happy Channel; Chefi.ro

History
- Launched: 1 July 2006;20 years ago

Links
- Website: www.antenai.ro

Antena Internațional (Romanian pronunciation: [anˈtena ˌinternat͡si.oˈnal]) is an international television station, owned by the Intact Media Group, designated for Romanians that are living outside Romania. It started broadcasting on 1 July 2006. It can be seen only in United States and Canada, where it is available on RSC2, one of the Romanian channels offered by Silviu Prigoană's RomSatNet. A subscription costs US$20 a month before taxes. All the shows that are broadcast simultaneously or reruns of shows already broadcast on Antena 1, Antena Stars, Antena 3 CNN or Happy Channel.

On 28 November 2016, Antena Internațional and other Intact Media channels went to the 16:9 HD format.

To match with Antena 1, Antena Internațional changed its logo on 31 October 2022. However, the idents remain unchanged, but it will feature the new and current logo.
