= Antenna 3 =

Antenna 3 ("Channel 3") may refer to:

- Antenna 3 Lombardia, a television station founded in Legnano in 1977 with the help of Enzo Tortora
- Antenna Tre Nordest, Italian local television station, operating in Triveneto

== See also ==
- Antena 3 (disambiguation)
