= Snow Arena =

Indoor ski park

Coordinates: 54°01′48″N 23°57′30″E

Druskininkai Snow Arena

The Snow Arena is an indoor ski slope in Druskininkai, Lithuania. It was opened on August 26, 2011. Cost of the arena is estimated to be around €30 million.

== Overview ==
The venue is one of the biggest indoor skiing slopes in the world, with the slope length of 460 metres (1,510 ft), width 50 metres (160 ft) and height of between 65.65 and 150 metres (215.4 and 492.1 ft) at the beginner slope. The indoor ski area is divided into two segments: terrain park and ski slope. A seasonal outdoor route of 640 metres (2,100 ft) is also available when the average outdoor temperatures fall below +5 °C.

Snow at Snow Arena is made by using PowderStar Series technology. Water and air are the only ingredients of the snow with no chemical or bacteriological additives used. The interior temperature of the hall, which is open all year round, is kept at a constant −2 to −4 °C (28 to 25 °F).

There are two ski lifts in the Snow Arena: a platter lift and a chair lift. There is also a Magic carpet (ski lift) for the beginner slope. Snow Arena offers ski rentals and lessons with the skiing school established at the arena, offers a wide range of programs for all abilities and offers group bookings for schools and businesses. It also has a small store that sells gloves, helmets and socks and offers a range of off-snow services, including four restaurants and two licensed bars.

== Notable visitors ==
President of the Republic of Lithuania Dalia Grybauskaitė opened Snow Arena in August 2011.

Members of the Italian National Skiing Team Denise Karbon, Manuela Mölgg and Sabrina Franchini coached by Livio Magoni were training for the World Cup at Snow Arena in November 2013.
