= Realitatea Plus =

Romanian TV news channel

- Country: Romania; Moldova

Programming
- Picture format: 576i (4:3, SDTV)

Ownership
- Owner: Geopol International SRL

History
- Launched: 16 January 2015
- Replaced: Realitatea TV
- Closed: -

Links
- Webcast: YouTube live stream
- Website: www.realitatea.net

Realitatea Plus (meaning "The Reality Plus") is an all-news channel launched on 16 January 2015 that took the place of Realitatea TV. Owned by Romanian politician Cozmin Guşă and businessman Maricel Păcuraru through Geopol International SRL, the network's license to broadcast has been suspended due to a conflict regarding the payment of regulatory fines, though it continues to broadcast through streaming.

== History ==
Realitatea Plus was launched on 16 January 2015.

On 1 November 2019, Realitatea Plus replaced the defunct all-news channel Realitatea TV on RCS & RDS. The original channel had its license revoked the previous day.

On 7 April 2026, the license for Realitatea Plus was suspended by National Audiovisual Council due to conflicts regarding unpaid fines from 2024 and 2025, with Geopol claiming the suspension was unwarranted as the fines were already paid. The network continues to operate otherwise through streaming presences, including its livestream on YouTube.

== Programs ==
- 100%
- Controversat
- Culisele Puterii
- Daytime News
- Deschde Lumea
- Culisele Statului Paralel
- Raport De Zi
- Plus Matinal
- Prime Time News
- Realitatea Zilei
- Lupta Pentru România
- Newsroom
