= Realitatea TV =

- Country: Romania

Programming
- Picture format: 576i (4:3, SDTV)

Ownership
- Owner: Cozmin Guşă; Maricel Păcuraru

History
- Launched: 7 November 2001
- Closed: 30 October 2019
- Replaced by: Realitatea Plus

Links
- Website: www.realitatea.net

Realitatea TV (Romanian pronunciation: [re.aliˈtate̯a teˈve], meaning "The Reality TV") is the former name of the Romanian news television channel Realitatea Plus. The channel began broadcasting in 2001 as a general entertainment channel and became the first Romanian news channel in 2002. Its owners are Romanian politician Cozmin Guşă and businessman Maricel Păcuraru.

After becoming insolvent in 2011 and being put into bankruptcy in 2019, the channel lost its license on 31 October 2019. The channel was replaced the next day, on 1 November 2019, by Realitatea Plus, a channel that was launched in 2015 on satellite for the public outside Romania. Realitatea Plus has a slightly modified version of the previous logo of Realitatea TV.

== History ==
Realitatea TV started broadcasting in 2001, as a general-profile TV station. However, it began broadcasting hourly newscasts and soon changed its format, becoming the first news channel in Romania. Prigoană hired Ion Cristoiu to supervise the channel and rise its audience.

In 2004, Silviu Prigoană sold the network to an Italian company that later sold it to Petrom, which subsequently lost it to Sorin Ovidiu Vântu, sometime in 2006. Vântu was occasionally accused of using his television to manipulate public opinion against President Băsescu and his party. After the channel went into insolvency in 2011, Vântu sold it to businessman Elan Schwarzenberg, while the management of the media group was under the control of Sebastian Ghiță.

In 2013, the channel was bought by Cozmin Guşă and Maricel Păcuraru.
