= Spurious =

Spurious may refer to:

- Spurious relationship in statistics
- Spurious emission or spurious tone in radio engineering
- Spurious key in cryptography
- Spurious interrupt in computing
- Spurious wakeup in computing
- Spurious, a 2011 novel by Lars Iyer
