= Russian Industrial Leaders Index =

The Russian Industrial Leaders Index (RUXX) is a composite index of Russian companies traded on global exchanges. The RUXX is calculated by Dow Jones & Company and managed by Press Release Group and RIA Novosti, the Russian State Information Agency.

It is a free-float market capitalization index: the higher the free-float market capitalization of the company, the higher its respective weight in the RIXX. A 20% weight cap factor is applied to the Index constituents. Usually, changes in the market capitalization and weights are implemented during quarterly review of the Index, according to the Dow Jones Indexes procedures.

The Index is computed using the last sale price for the trading day (5.30 pm, New York time). Its constituents include Russian companies whose stocks or Global Depository Receipts are listed on global exchanges: New York Stock Exchange, London Stock Exchange, Nasdaq or AMEX.
