= TV Antena 10 =

TV Antena 10 (ZYP 285)
Teresina, Piauí; Brazil
- Channels: Digital: 34 (UHF); Virtual: 10

Programming
- Affiliations: Record

Ownership
- Owner: Grupo JET; (JET Radiodifusão Ltda.)
- Sister stations: Rede Aleluia Teresina

History
- First air date: December 19, 1988
- Former call signs: ZYB 353 (1986-2018)
- Former channel numbers: Analog: 10 (VHF, 1988–2018)
- Former affiliations: Rede Manchete (1988-1997)

Technical information
- Licensing authority: ANATEL
- ERP: 4.4 kW
- Transmitter coordinates: 5°6′29.5″S 42°47′51.1″W

Links
- Public license information: Profile
- Website: a10mais.com

TV Antena 10 (channel 10) is a Brazilian television station based in Teresina, capital of Piauí in Brazil, affiliated with Record. The station is owned by José Elias Tajra, president of the JET Group, and brother of the lawyer, journalist and businessman Jesus Elias Tajra (who in turn owns TV Cidade Verde).

== History ==
TV Antena 10 was opened on December 19, 1988, as an affiliate of Rede Manchete, becoming the third television station in Piauí to go on air. The station benefited from the success of the broadcaster's national telenovelas and series (such as Pantanal in 1990) and Japanese and foreign series and cartoons (from 1988 onwards), which at times led to its leadership in the region. In the following years, the broadcaster asked MiniCom for concessions to install repeaters in the main cities in the interior of Piauí, making microwave links to areas far from the capital.

In mid-1997, according to Teresina newspaper publications at the time, after just over eight years as an affiliate of Manchete, TV Antena 10 was intending to change networks. The reasons were the administrative crises (which the Rio broadcaster faced in 1992/93) and the drop in audience compared to other networks (such as SBT, Record and Bandeirantes) after rising from the crisis between 1995 and 1997 (which would lead to a new crisis in 1998 and its shutdown in 1999), which has harmed the affiliate.

On November 12, 1997, TV Antena 10 exchanged Rede Manchete for Rede Record. After the affiliate changed networks, Manchete was never again tuned in Teresina until its extinction in 1999. From the end of the 1990s until the mid-2000s, the broadcaster invested in changing equipment and in satellite transmission, reaching almost 100% coverage of Piauí.

On September 15, 2008, TV Antena 10 premiered the news program Piauí no Ar, presented by Luís Fortes, from Monday to Friday. It was the first time that the station had shown a news program in the morning in 20 years. On March 2, 2009, the news program was replaced by Fala Piauí, with Cristiane Sekeff, who also brought journalist Jordan Feitosa to the production, text editing and execution of the program. In October, Pádua Araújo, presenter of the Balanço Geral program for almost two years, was fired from the station after making derogatory comments about deputy Henrique Rebelo (PT), after he made public a statement in which the deputy defended the controversial consumption of goat meat, which the politician denies.

On January 26, 2010, presenter Mariano Marques left the station, after having disagreements with the journalism management. "I left, yes. I have a clear conscience and the certainty of my duty fulfilled (...). I really like the family that owns the station. They are all my friends. It was nothing like them (...)," he told Portal Meio Norte. However, the next day, the station's management called the presenter and asked him not to leave the station, so that the program that has her continues to air, which led to the dismissal.

On February 26, 2024, TV Antena 10 started transmitting its signal via satellite.
