= Sportal.bg =

sportal.bg
- Website: www.sportal.bg
- Launched: 15 March 2006; 20 years ago

Sportal.bg is a sports media website. It was launched on March 15, 2006 in Sofia, Bulgaria. It employs over 40 journalists delivering over 300 daily news items from all over the world. The site currently receives over 1,000,000 page views daily. It is the first Bulgarian website to launch its own streaming television service.
