= Gazeta Sporturilor =

Daily newspaper in Romania

- Type: Daily newspaper
- Format: Compact
- Owner(s): Ringier Sportal S.R.L (Ringier and Sportal Media Group)
- Editor: Mitică Docan
- Founded: 1924
- Headquarters: Dimitrie Pompeiu, 9-9A
- City: Bucharest
- Country: Romania
- Website: www.gsp.ro

Gazeta Sporturilor (English: The Sports Gazette) is a Romanian sports website, originally founded in 1924 as a daily newspaper. It was the third-oldest daily newspaper in Europe, running for 99 years of uninterrupted publication before issuing its last edition on 31 October 2023.

Gazeta Sporturilor focuses primarily on association football, but also covers most sports events related to Romania, as well as the most important international sports news. It is owned by Ringier Sportal S.R.L, a joint venture of Ringier Romania S.R.L., and the Bulgarian Sportal Media Group.

Between 2008 and 2014, a related television channel named GSP TV was aired.

== History ==
The newspaper was founded in 1924, even though it did not appear during the Communist period, when it was replaced by the Sportul newspaper, published by the Romanian Communist Party. In 1990, Gazeta Sporturilor was re-established, being one of the first privatised newspapers in the country. The headquarters is in Bucharest.

On 25 July 2008, GSP TV and GSP TV 2 were launched in the Intact Television Group.

Gazeta Sporturilor is the oldest and longest sports newspaper in Romania. It is the best sold newspaper in Romania (source: ARM), has the bigger audience (Source: NAS) and is the most visited online newspaper in Romania (source trafic.ro).

After the communist regime, was abolished and replaced with "Sportul" newspaper under the Communist Party. Resumed its old name in 1990. It was among the first newspapers privatized in Romania after 1990. He edited the supplement "Fotbal" between 1966 and 1974, and between 1985 and 1997. Containing a large population of footballers by club teams and Romania. Starting in 1966 awarded the title Romanian Footballer of the Year.

In 2000, the newspaper had average sales of around 26,026 copies, moving up to 64,795 copies in 2009, becoming the leader in sports newspapers. A short period the Swiss trust Ringier owned the newspaper (the whole Intact Group). Director of the newspaper is Ovidiu Ioanițoaia and Cătălin Țepelin editor. Longer part of a team of renowned journalists such as Cristian Geambașu, Dan Udrea, Răzvan Luțac and others.

On 2 July 2010, Gazeta Sporturilor was the first newspaper in Romania, and the 4th in world which contained 3D pictures and ads.

On Oct. 31, 2023, the newspaper ceased publishing a print edition and became an online-only publication.

== Association football awards ==
Gazeta Sporturilor is well known for annually recognising the best performing Romanian association football player, who is awarded the Romanian Footballer of the Year trophy in late December. In 2004 and 2008, the newspaper inaugurated the Romania Coach of the Year and the Foreign Player of the Year in Romania awards, respectively.

Since September 2021, it also honours players and head coaches deemed to have been the best over the previous month.

The ProSport website and the Clubul Sportiv al Jurnaliștilor association also hand out annual football awards, however they were started after the fall of communism, while Gazeta Sporturilor has been presenting the Romanian Footballer of the Year award since 1966.

== See also ==
- GSP TV
- Romanian Footballer of the Year trophy
