= Antena 3 CNN =

Romanian television news channel

- Country: Romania
- Broadcast area: Romania
- Network: Antena Group
- Affiliates: CNN International
- Headquarters: Bulevardul Dimitrie Pompeiu, nr. 9-9A, Complex Iride Business Park, Bucharest, Romania

Programming
- Picture format: 1080i HDTV (downscaled to 576i for the SDTV feed)

Ownership
- Owner: Antena 3 S.A. (Intact Media Group); Skydance (Brand licensing of CNN)
- Sister channels: Antena 1 Antena Stars; Happy Channel; Chefi.ro

History
- Launched: 27 June 2005
- Former names: Antena 3 (2005-2022)

Links
- Website: www.antena3.ro

Availability

Antena 3 Cable News Network, known as Antena 3 CNN, formerly Antena 3 (Romanian pronunciation: [anˈtena ˈtrej]), is a Romanian news channel owned by Antena 3 S.A. and part of the Intact Media Group. An Exclusive News Partner of CNN International in Romania since September 27, 2022, it focuses on news programmes and current events, mainly with political and economic topics. It was launched on June 27, 2005 as the third Romanian 24-hour news channel, after Realitatea TV being the first television channel launched in 2001 and N24 being the second television channel launched in 2004, which was later transformed into a generalist television channel in 2010.

It is one of the most viewed Romanian news channels, leading in television ratings on the news segment in prime-time hours together with Romania TV (mostly above and sometimes second to Antena 3 CNN in ratings) The station is one of the five Romanian TV channels that have live anchors from 06:00 every morning to 01:00 every night.

Antena 3 CNN was also distributed in Serbia in the Romanian language-extra package of the DTH platform Digi TV. The official website of the TV channel hosts all daily shows which are made available for watching in an archive that is generally reloaded every month. Starting 2006 the TV channel also allowed online users to watch it live on the internet on its official website, and now on their on-demand subscription service Antenaplay. Furthermore, since October 29, 2020, the 3FM radio station (currently only in Bucharest) also airs all of Antena 3 CNN's programmes.

The station's website receives an average between of 300,000 to 400,000 visitors a day being one of the most visited Romanian websites on the market. By comparison, Gazeta Sporturilor, a media product owned by Ringier, gets more than one million hits a day.

It is affiliated with CNN International since 2011, after CNN ceased their affiliation with Realitatea TV. later becoming a partner channel of CNN in May 2020. Its main news program is News Hour with CNN, broadcasting from Monday to Friday at 18:00 EET/EEST, while its other television programs that are notable for airing on Antena 3 CNN include Sinteza zilei, În gura presei, Decisiv, NewsRoom, Exces de putere, Descoperiți, Subiectiv and News Magazine, among others.

== Program ==
- Sinteza Zilei
- În Gura Presei
- News Hour with CNN
- Newsroom
- Subiectiv
- Exces de Putere
- Income Magazine
- Știrile Dimineții
- Decisiv
- News Magazine
- Descoperiți
- Numai de Bine
- Top News
- Cod Rosu
- Zona Zero
- This Week With CNN
- Ora de foc

== Sport competitions ==
- Formula One
- 2026 FIFA World Cup

== Controversies ==
Throughout its existence, Antena 3 has been criticized and fined for misinformation, manipulation and partisanship in relation to Romanian politics. In a December 2018 article, the international organization Reporters Without Borders opined that Antena 3 is being used as a tool for media propaganda while expressing concern about the sharp decline in press freedom in Romania.

However, since 2016, some of their programmes have broadcast Fox News news materials, reports about possible political implications of George Soros in civic movements, funded NGO's and protests in Romania and most of their head anchors showed support and sympathy during the 2016 U.S. elections to candidate and former U.S. President Donald Trump, holding generally a right-wing like attitude in these topic, even though their channel is against most right-wing political parties in Romania, except for ALDE.

The channel is widely viewed as untrustworthy. It recently showed a soft-eurosceptic attitude after heads of the European Commission cautioned and criticised the Romanian government for the penal code modifications which might affect the rule of law in Romania, but generally swings after Jean Claude Juncker's positive view of Romania entering the Schengen area and after saying that "Romania is ready to take the presidency of the EU Council", that contradicts Iohannis' negative remarks that "the Romanian government is not ready to take the responsibility of the presidency". It is a 24 hours news channel with pretty much allegiance to the Romanian centre-left wing political spectrum and relates more positively about the centre-left government coalition of PSD and ALDE than the usual media, usually inviting ministers, MPs and political figures of the PSD-ALDE government coalition than the opposition that is usually just one guest, rarely being the opposition parties leaders, and reflects in a mostly negative perspective the opposition parties and the actual presidential administration. Largely known for launching heavy campaigns against the former head of the DNA, Laura Codruța Kövesi because of her allegedly abusive and "Soviet-style" management of the institution and using it as a "mechanism of secret police" by the Romanian Intelligence Service in favour of the presidential power, calling it repeatedly as the "deep state" the "parallel state" or the "binomial power".

The channel has been accused of taking a series of biased positions during the coverage of Dan Voiculescu's conviction and arrest, about the GRIVCO criminal files, and excess of zeal during a judiciary requirement to where were forced to leave the building where their headquarters and studios are located in several days after confiscation by the fiscal authorities (ANAF). It is regarded as the most supportive of the Romanian government, others being Realitatea TV and Digi24 with the most opponent and critical attitude of the PSD-ALDE government and partially neutral B1 TV (although very rival to Antena 3 until the end of the Băsescu presidency) and TVR, the Romanian public broadcaster.
