= Happy Channel (Romanian TV channel) =

- Country: Romania
- Network: Antena TV Group (Intact Media Group)
- Headquarters: Bucharest, Romania

Programming
- Picture format: 4:3 (576i SDTV)

Ownership
- Owner: Intact Media Group
- Sister channels: Antena 1 Antena Stars; Antena 3 CNN; Chefi.ro; Antena Internațional

History
- Launched: 15 January 2006 (as Euforia Lifestyle TV); 8 March 2016 (as Happy Channel)
- Former names: Euforia Lifestyle TV (2006 - 2016)

Links
- Website: https://www.happychannel.tv/

Happy Channel is a television channel, which is based in Bucharest, Romania. Launched on 15 January 2006, it is a part of the Intact group, formerly owned by the businessman and politician Dan Voiculescu.

The television channel is dedicated to women and their families, being in direct competition with the Acasă TV channel.

== Original series ==
Year	Original title	English title	Starring
2017	Când mama nu-i acasă	When mom is not home	Cristina Ciobănașu & Vlad Gherman
2017–19	O gramada de caramele	A collection of candies	Cristina Ciobănașu & Vlad Gherman

== Celebrities ==
- Carmen Tănase
- Anca Țurcașiu
- Cristina Ciobănașu
- Vlad Gherman
- Raphael Tudor
- Carmen Brumă
- Irina Margareta Nistor

== Shows ==
- Dreptul la fericire (2016)
- Happy Day (2016-2017)
- Happy Cafe (2023-)
- CulTour (2018-2022)

== Series ==
Year	Original title	Country	Romanian title
2011	Revenge	United States	Răzbunare
2014	My Spring Days (내 생애 봄날)	South Korea	Primăvara vieții mele
2015	Asla Vazgeçmem	Turkey	Prizoniera dragostei
1994	Friends	United States	Prietenii tăi
2004	House	United States	Dr. House
2009	White Collar	United States	Hoțul fermecător
2009	Glee	United States	Glee
2013	El tiempo entre costuras	Spain	Iubirile croitoresei
2013	Empress Ki (기황후)	South Korea	Împărăteasa Ki
2012	Seoyoung, My Daughter (내 딸 서영이)	South Korea	Ură de fiică
2012	Saving Hope	Canada	Păstrează speranța
2010	Downton Abbey	United Kingdom	Downton Abbey
2007	Life	United States	Pe viață
2014	Secret Love Affair (밀회)	South Korea	Dragoste clandestină
2013	Devious Maids	United States	Menajere ambițioase
2010	The Glades	United States	Soare, palmieri și crime
2011	Suits	United States	Costume
2007	Private Practice	United States	Private Practice: Medici în Santa Monica
2011	Fairly Legal	United States	Parțial legal
2014	Mi corazón es tuyo	Mexico	Inima mea e a ta
2014	Muchacha italiana viene a casarse	Mexico	Fiorella, spune da!
2013	Velvet	Spain	Velvet
2016	Un camino hacia el destino	Mexico	Chemarea destinului
2014	Elif	Turkey	Elif
2011	Hart of Dixie	United States	Dr. Hart în Bluebell
2013	Motive	Canada	Motivul
2015	A que no me dejas	Mexico	Te provoc să mă părăsești!
2013	Solamente vos	Argentina	Doar tu
2013	Mr. Selfridge	United Kingdom	Mr. Selfridge
2016	Corazón que miente	Mexico	Inima te minte
2013	Bir Aşk Hikayesi	Turkey	O poveste de iubire
2007	Gossip Girl	United States	Gossip Girl: Intrigi la New York
2013	Adini Kalbime Yazdim	Turkey	Legea pământului
2014	Kiraz Mevsimi	Turkey	Sezonul cireșelor
2016	Tres veces Ana	Mexico	De trei ori Ana
2011	Suburgatory	United States	Imperfecta viaţã perfectã
2018	Manifest	United States	Destinaţia
2013	Mom	United States	Mama
2004	Desperate Housewives	United States	Neveste disperate
