= Intact Media Group =

Romanian media group

- Industry: Media
- Founded: 1991
- Founder: Dan Voiculescu
- Headquarters: Intact Media Center, Garlei Street, no. 1B, Bucharest, Romania
- Key people: Camelia Voiculescu (President)
- Divisions: television, radio, print, online and B2B
- Website: www.intactmediagroup.ro

Intact Media Group is the first Romanian media group based entirely on a private local business. A considerable number of the most important brands in the audio-visual and print industry have been launched under this umbrella since its first product, Intact Printing House, was established in 1991.

The Intact Media Center headquarters, at Gârlei Street, no. 1B, were seized by the state on Friday, 8 August 2014, as a result of the judgement sentencing Dan Voiculescu, the founder of Intact Media Group, to ten years of imprisonment. The journalists of the broadcasting company Antena 3 CNN, part of the Intact Media Group, have been conducting investigations on high-profile political leaders and unveiling multiple corruption cases under the Romanian politicians. One example is the former president of Romania, Traian Băsescu, who, together with his brother, Mircea Băsescu, was accused of taking bribes in order to influence justice. Mircea Băsescu was sentenced to four years' imprisonment on 8 January 2016.

The channels that the company owns are: Antena 1, Antena Stars, Antena 3 CNN, Happy Channel, Chefi.ro

== Member companies ==
As of 2025, the companies that are part of the group are:

=== Television ===
- Antena 1
- Antena 3 CNN
- Antena Stars
- Happy Channel
- Chefi.ro

=== Print ===
- Jurnalul Național
- Income Magazine

=== Online ===
- a1.ro
- antenastars.ro
- antena3.ro
- tv.happy.ro
- chefi.ro
- antenaplay.ro
- lajumate.ro
- homezz.ro
- carzz.ro
- jobzz.ro
- observatornews.ro
- as.ro
- jurnalul.ro
- catine.ro
- spynews.ro
- useit.ro

=== Radio ===
- Romantic FM
- Radio ZU
- 3FM

=== B2B ===
- Dream Film Production
- Tipografia Intact
- Seed Consultants Branding & Design
- Open Media Network
- Euroexpo
- Antena Academy

=== Formerly ===
- Gazeta Sporturilor (until 2018)
- ZU TV
- BBC Good Food
- BBC Science Focus
- BBC Top Gear
- The Industry
