= Antena Stars =

Romanian television channel

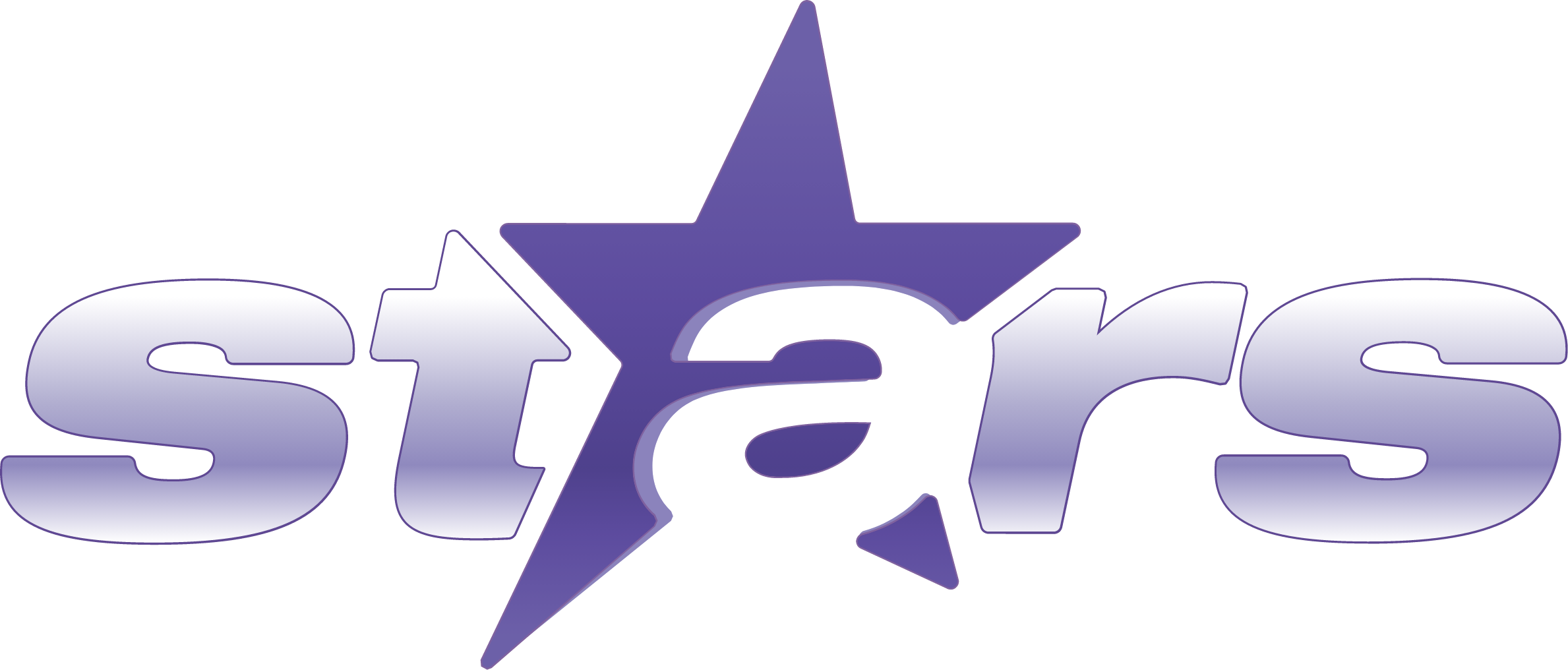
- Country: Romania
- Broadcast area: Romania

Programming
- Picture format: 1080i HDTV (downscaled to 576i for the SDTV feed)

Ownership
- Owner: Antena TV Group (Intact Media Group)
- Sister channels: Antena 1 Antena 3 CNN; Happy Channel; Chefi.ro

History
- Launched: 9 April 2007 (as Antena 2); 17 December 2013 (as Antena Stars)
- Former names: Antena 2 (2007–2013)

Links
- Website: www.antenastars.ro

Antena Stars is a Romanian television channel. It started broadcasting on 9 April 2007 and it is a part of the Intact group, owned by the family of the Romanian businessman and politician Dan Voiculescu.

On 17 December 2013, the television station changed its name from Antena 2 to Antena Stars.

== Program ==
- Știrile Antena Stars (2024-present)
- Mireasa: Capriciile iubirii (2021-present)
- Un show păcătos (2024-present)
- Viața fără filtru (2024-present)
- Lumea nevăzută (2019-present)
- Visul Românesc - Succes Internațional (2024-present)
- Vacanță de vedetă (2024-present)
- Summer Star (2025)
- SpyNews Tv (2024-present)
- Acces Direct (2022-present)
- Meniu de vedetă (2024-present)
- Xtra Night Show (Weekend) (2024-present)
- Xtra Night Show (2021-2024)
- Star La Mare Fitza (2014-present)
- Star Matinal (2013-2021: 2023-2024)
- Star Special
- Prodanca. Punct și de la capăt (2024)
- Familia Mireasa (2024)
- Star Magazin (2013-2024)
- Star News (2013-2023)
- Showbiz Report (2013: 2020-2023)
- VedeTOP (2014-2024)
- Mămici de Pitici, cu Lipici (2020-2024)
- Români de ocazie (2023-2024)
- Petrecem românește (2022-2024)
- Perfecte cu defecte (2022-2023)
- REAlă by Ana Morodan (2022-2023)
- Te iubesc de nu te vezi (2018-2019: 2023)
- Poliția Modei (2013: 2021-2023)
- I.A cu Stil (2021-2023)
- Vedetelion (2014-2023)
- Party Like A Star (2015-2018)
- Chef De Viata (2021-2022)
- La Famiglia (2022)
- Star Chef (2014-2019: 2021-2022)
- Cea mai tare din parcare! (2019-2022)
- Brigitte & Pastramă (2020-2021)
- Ghicește vedeta (2019-2021)
- Arena Starurilor (2021)
- Star Salvator (2015-2016: 2020-2021)
- Fetele lu' Tavi, by Gabriela Cristea (2021)
- Giani Kiriță (2020-2021)
- Trips&Tricks – La drum cu vedetele (2019-2020)
- Jador Adevarat (2020)
- Cool Summer Nights (2017-2020)
- Cool Sunday Nights (2017-2018)
- Stăpânii vedetelor (2018-2020)
- Refresh by Oana Turcu (2013-2020)
- Prodanca și Reghe: Prețul Succesului (2020)
- Agentia VIP (2017-2020)
- Răi da' buni (2013-2020)
- Like a Star! (2019-2020)
- Dragoste fără secrete (2019)
- Agentul VIP (2013-2017)
- Prodanca și Reghe: Viața în Dubai (2019)
- Dincolo de aparenţe (2013-2018)
- Party-tura lui Morar (2015-2016)
- Descopera-ti frumusetea (2017)
- Necenzurat (2013-2016)
- Capcana seducției: Test de fidelitate (2016)
- Star Zodiac (2013-2016)
- Stars Hunter (2016)
- Ireal (2014-2016)
- Asistentele (2014)
- Brigada mobilă: Ultimul pas spre adevăr (2014)
- Petrecerea burlăcițelor (2014)
- Serghei, eu (2014)
- Wonderlife (2013-2014)
- Jocurile faimei (2014)
- Călător pe-o gură de rai (2013-2014)

== Imported TV Series ==
- Ally Mcbeal (USA) (2020-2022)
- Baywatch (USA) (2021-2022)
- Kumkum Bhagya (India) (2015-2021)
- Udaan (India) (2016)
- Naagin (India) (2016)
