= Antena 1 (Romania) =

Television network in Romania

- Logo used since 2022
- Country: Romania
- Broadcast area: Romania

Programming
- Picture format: 1080i HDTV

Ownership
- Owner: Antena TV Group (Intact Media Group)
- Sister channels: Antena Stars; Antena 3 CNN; Happy Channel; Chefi.ro; Antena Internaţional

History
- Launched: November 29, 1993; 32 years ago

Links
- Website: a1.ro; observatornews.ro

Antena 1 (Romanian pronunciation: [anˈtena ˈunu]) is a Romanian free-to-air television network owned by the Antena TV Group, part of the Intact Media Group. Its programming consists of television news programs, soap opera shows, football matches, entertainment programmes, movies and television series.

Antena 1's headquarters was seized by the Romanian state on 8 August 2014, due to a judicial sentence against Dan Voiculescu, the founder of Intact Media Group. The building may be sold in order for the state to recuperate the loss brought to it as a result of the fraudulent privatization of the Institute for Alimentary Research in 2003. After company employees destroyed the interior of the building whilst moving out, the building required refurbishment before being placed on sale. The National Agency for the Management of Seized Assets (ANABI) has placed the building for sale on its website.

== Current Programs ==
The station's top-rated local productions include entertainment shows, news programs and TV series.

=== News ===
Observator (news program) Observator is Antena 1's daily newscast (that airs at the Observator 12 from Monday to Friday) it is one of the most watched newscasts in Romania. It has fifth daily editions, starting at 6.00 AM, 12.00 PM on weekdays or 1 PM on weekend, 4.00 PM, 7.00 PM, and 11.00 PM/11.30 PM. Its flagship daily evening newscast is Observator 19.00, anchored by Alessandra Stoicescu on weekdays, and Nadina Cămpean on weekend.

The daily morning edition of Observator is broadcast at 6.00 AM. Its hosts are Iuliana Pepene and Bogdan Alecsandru on weekdays, Mihai Jurca and Andra Petrescu on weekend are the hosts for Observator 6.00 AM. Florin Căruceru and Mădălina Iacob are the hosts for Observator 13.00. From Monday to Friday, Mihaela Călin, Olivia Păunescu and Valentin Butnaru are the hosts for Observator 12.00, Valentin Butnaru and Oana Ormenișan are anchoring the broadcast at 17:00. Also, from Monday to Thursday, Observator has a nightly news edition, hosted by Marius Pancu.

On November 28, 2016, when Antena 1 launched its own HD feed, Observator debuted a new set, which includes a new studio, a new logo, opening theme and a new graphics package. The Observator website, observator.tv, was also relaunched at the end of November 2016. On April 19, 2020, Observator came with a new graphics package and its website changed its name and domain to observatornews.ro, launching also a news application.

=== Original TV Series ===
Antena 1 Original TV Series
Program	Status/Season	Debut	Current airtime
Ana, Mi-ai fost scrisă în ADN	3	2025	Thursday at 20:30 (EET)

==== Variety shows ====
Antena 1 variety shows
Program	Status/Season	Debut	Current airtime
Neatza cu Răzvan și Dani	19	2008	Monday−Friday at 08:00 (EET)
Mireasa	14	2020	Monday−Friday at 14:00 (EET)

== Sport competitions ==
- UEFA Nations League
- 2026 FIFA World Cup and 2030 FIFA World Cup
- Formula One
