= List of radio stations receiving public funding =

List of publicly funded radio channels

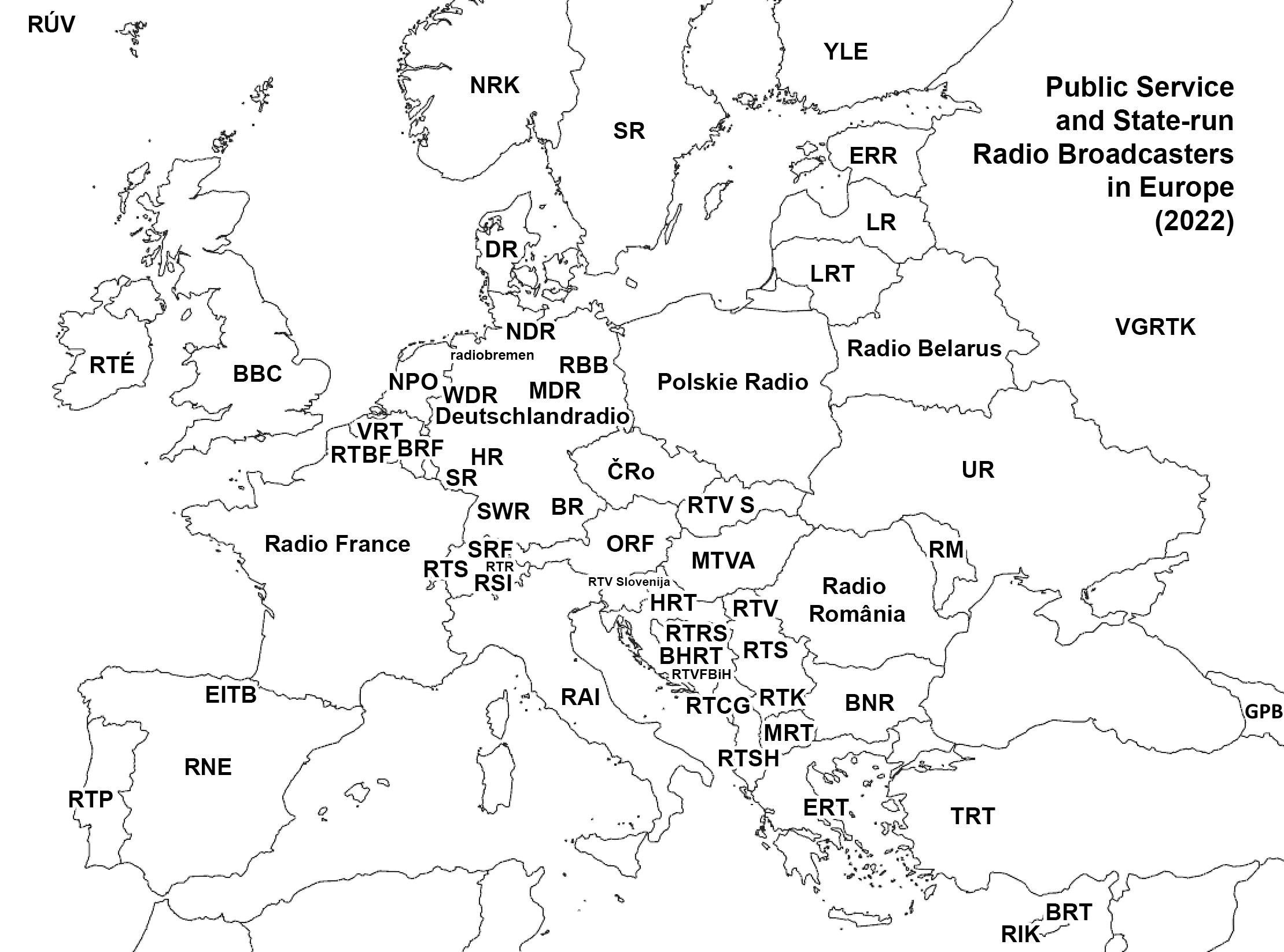
Map of European Public and State-run Radio Broadcasters

This article contains domestic radio channels that receive public funding by law. The list indicates if minority languages are used in the broadcasts. This lists excludes the external services (international channels) and community radio stations that receive public funding by application.

Some are run by public service broadcasters who have editorial independence from the government, others are run by state media where the government has a significant say over what is published.

== Afghanistan ==
RTA - Radio Television Afghanistan

- Kabul Radio FM 93 - pashtu
- 32 provincial stations

== Albania ==
RTSH - Radio Televizioni Shqiptar / Radio Tirana

- Radio Tirana 1 - News, talk
- Radio Tirana 2 - Youth music
- Radio Tirana 3 - Albanian music
- Radio Tirana Klasik - Classical
- Regional channels
  - Radio Korça (includes Macedonian and Aroman language programs)
  - Radio Gjirokastra (includes Greek and Vlach (aroman) language programs)
  - Radio Shkodra
  - Radio Kukësi

== Algeria ==
ENRS - Entreprise nationale de radiodiffusion sonore - Radio Algérienne

- Chaîne 1 - Arabic
- Chaîne 2 - Berber
- Chaîne 3 - French
- Radio Culture - Arabic
- Radio Coran
- 48 local stations
  - Oldest Local station: Radio Oran-El Bahia - Arabic, French

== Andorra ==
Ràdio i Televisió d'Andorra

- Radio Nacional d'Andorra
- Andorra Música

== Angola ==
Rádio national de Angola

- Canal A
- Rádio N'Gola Yetu
- Rádio Luanda
- Rádio FM Estéreo
- Rádio 5
- Rádio Cazenga
- Rádio Escola
- Rádio Viana

== Anguilla ==
- Radio Anguilla

== Argentina ==
Radio Nacional de Argentina

- AM870 - Generic
- R. Nacional Clasica
- R. Nacional Folclorica
- R. Nacional Rock
- Radiodifusión Argentina al Exterior

== Armenia ==
Public Radio of Armenia

- 1st Program - Առաջին ծրագիր - talk
- Imradio My radio - Իմ ռադիո - pop
- Yezdi radio - Եզդի ռադիո - yazidi ethnic program
- Arjik - Ռադիո Արևիկ* - children's program

== Australia ==
ABC Australian Broadcasting Corporation

- Radio National - talk
- ABC News - all news
- Classic FM - classical music
- Triple J - pop, rock
- Radio Grandstand - sports
- ABC Local 54 stations

SBS Special Broadcasting Service

- SBS 1, 2, 3, 4 - ethnic
- SBS Arabic 24 - Arabic

== Austria ==
Österreichischer Rundfunk

- Ö1 - news, culture
- Hitradio Ö3 - pop
- FM4 - youth, alternative
- 8 Regional channels
  - Radio Burgenland (includes Hungarian, Romani, Czech, Croatian, Slovak programs)
  - Radio Kärnten
  - Radio Niederösterreich
  - Radio Oberösterreich
  - Radio Salzburg
  - Radio Steiermark
  - Radio Tirol
  - Radio Vorarlberg
  - Radio Wien
- Radio Agora (Slovene, partly ORF-made programs)
- Radio Wien

== Azerbaijan ==
- Azerbaijan Radyiosu
- Radio Respublika
- İctimai Radio

=== Nakhchivan Autonomous Republic ===
- Naxcivan Radio

== Bahrain ==
Bahrein News Agency

- Radio Bahrain - English
- Songs Radio - Arabic
- Shababiya Radio - Youth
- Holy Quran Radio

== Bangladesh ==
Bangladesh Betar

- Dhaka-A Home Service
- FM 100 - Commercial
- Traffic Channel

== Belarus ==
Belteleradiokompaniya - Белтелерадиокомпания

- Radio1 - 1st channel - Першы Нацыянальны канал Беларускага радыё
- Radio Belarus - Беларусь - Multilingual
- Culture - Культура- Regional culture and music
- Stolitsa - Сталіца - Regional/local (rock music)
- Radius FM - youth music
- Regional stations
  - TRK Brest
    - Radio Brest
    - Gorod FM
  - TRK Vitebsk
    - Radio Vitebsk
  - TRK Gomel
    - Gomel FM
  - TRK Grodno
    - Radio Grodno
  - TRK Mogilev
    - Radio Mogilev

== Belgium ==
=== French ===
RTBF - Radio Télévision Belge Francophone

- La Première - news, talk
- VivaCité - pop, regional news
- Musiq3 - classical, jazz, opera
- Classic 21 - rock, pop
- Tipik - young alt pop

=== Dutch ===
VRT - Vlaamse Radio- en Televisieomroeporganisatie

- Radio 1 - news, talk, culture
- Radio 2 - pop
- Studio Brussel - young, alt pop
- MNM - hits
- Klara - classical music

=== German ===
BRF - Belgischer Rundfunk

- BRF1 - speech, pop, chanson
- BRF2 - pop schlager, volkstüümliche musik

== Belize ==
none

== Benin ==
ORTB - Office de Radiodiffusion et Télévision du Bénin

- Radio Bénin - French
- Radio Parakou - local languages
- Atlantic FM - music

== Bermuda ==
BBC - Bermuda Broadcasting Company

- Bermuda Spirit
- ZFB-FM
- ZBM
- ZBM-FM

== Bhutan ==
BBS - Bhutan Broadcasting Service

- Bhutan Broadcasting Service - Dzonga, English, Sharchop, Nepali

== Bolivia ==
Sistema Nacional de Radiodifusión Boliviana del Estado Plurinacional de Bolivia

- Red Patria Nueva

== Bosnia and Herzegovina ==
BHRT - Radiotelevizija Bosne i Hercegovine

- BH Radio 1

RTRS Radio Televizija Republike Srpske

- Radio Republike Srpske

RTVFBiH - Radiotelevizija Federacije Bosne i Hercegovine

- Federalni radio

== Botswana ==
Radio Botswana

- RB1
- RB2 (commercial)

== Brazil ==
EBC - Rádio Nacional

- Rádio Nacional Brasília - News talk pop
- Rádio Nacional FM - Brazilian music
- Rádio Nacional da Amazônia - news drama music
- Rádio Nacional do Rio de Janeiro - generalist speech
- Rádio Nacional do Alto Solimões - news local culture

Radio MEC (Rádio Música, Educação e Cultura)

- Rádio MEC AM - Brazilian music
- Rádio MEC FM - classical music, news

São Paulo Government

- Rádio Cultura AM/FM - news, Brazilian music

== Brunei ==
RTB - Radio Television Brunei

- Nasional FM - talk
- Pilihan FM - pop, English
- Pelangi FM - local
- Harmoni FM - sports, 50-90s music, family
- Nur Islam - religious

== Bulgaria ==
BNR - Bulgarsko Nacionalno Radio

- Horizont/Програма Хоризонт - news talk music
- Hristo Botev/Програма Христо Ботев - culture drama jazz
- 9 regional channels
  - Radio Burgas
  - Radio Blagoevgrad
  - Radio Varna
  - Radio Vidin
  - Radio Kardzhali (includes Turkish language programs)
  - Radio Plovdiv
  - Radio Sofia
  - Radio Stara Zagora
  - Radio Shumen

== Burkina Faso ==
RTB - Radio Télévision du Burkina

== Burundi ==
RTNB - Radio Television Nationale de Burundi

- 1ere chaine - French, English
- 2eme chaine - French, English

== Cambodia ==
RNK - Radio National of Kampuchea

- AM 918 - khmer
- FM 105.7 - khmer
- 12 regional programs

== Cameroon ==
CRTV - Cameroon Radio Television

- Poste National

== Canada ==
CBC - Canadian Broadcasting Corporation / Radio-Canada

=== English ===
- CBC Radio One - English - Local and national talk
- CBC Music - English - Adult music
- CBC Radio 3 - English - Digital radio

=== French ===
- Ici Radio-Canada Première - French - Local and national talk
- Ici Musique - French - Adult music

== Central African Republic ==
Radiodiffusion Television Centrafricaine

- Radio Centrafrique

== Cape Verde ==
RTC - Radiotelevisão Caboverdiana

== Chad ==
RNT - Radiodiffusion Nationale Tchadienne

== China ==
CNR - China National Radio / 中央人民广播电台

- CNR 1 - Voice of China
- CNR 2 - Business Radio
- CNR 3 - Music Radio
- CNR 4 - Golden Radio
- CNR 5 - The Cross-Strait Radio
- CNR 6 - Easy Radio
- CNR 7 - Radio The Greater Bay
- CNR 8 - Minorities
- CNR 9 - Voice Of Literature
- CNR 10 - Sounds of the Elderly
- CNR 11 - Tibetan Service
- CNR 13 - Uyghur Service
- CNR Voice Of Hong Kong
- CNR 15 - China Traffic Radio
- CNR Voice Of Countryside
- CNR 17 - Uyghur Service

=== Provincial radio ===
Separate organization in each province and large city with 4-10 stations.

- Beijing
  - Radio Beijing Corporation
    - Beijing Music Radio (FM97.4)
    - Beijing News Radio (FM94.5)
    - Beijing City Radio (FM107.3)
    - Beijing Traffic Radio (FM103.9)
    - Beijing Literature and Art Broadcasting (FM87.6)
    - Beijing Youth Broadcasting (FM98.2)
    - Beijing Sports Radio (FM102.5)
    - The Voice of Jingjinji (FM100.6)
- Tianjin
  - Tianjin Television And Radio Station
    - Tianjin News Radio (FM97.2)
    - Tianjin Traffic Radio (FM106.8)
    - Tianjin Economic Radio (FM101.4)
    - Tianjin Life Radio (FM91.1)
    - Tianjin Cultural Radio (FM104.6)
    - Tianjin Music Broadcasting (FM99)
    - Tianjin Rural Broadcasting (FM88.5)
    - Tianjin Novel Broadcasting (AM666)
    - Tianjin Crosstalk Broadcasting (FM92.1)
    - Tianjin Binhai Broadcasting (FM87.8)
- Shanghai
  - Shanghai Media Group
    - Shanghai News Radio (FM93.4)
    - Shanghai Traffic Radio (FM105.7)
    - First Financial Radio (FM90.9)
    - Shanghai Story Radio (FM107.2)
    - Driving FM/Voice Of Changjiang-River Delta (FM89.9)
    - Dynamic 101 (FM101.7)
    - Love Radio (FM103.7)
    - Classical 94.7 (FM94.7)
    - Digital Music Radio (KFM981)
    - Shanghai Drama Broadcasting (FM97.2)
    - Shanghai Five Star Sports Broadcasting (FM94.0)
    - Pujiang Voice (AM1422)
- Chongqing
  - Chongqing Broadcasting Group
    - Chongqing News 96.8 FM
    - Chongqing Economic 101.5 FM
    - Chongqing Traffic 95.5 FM
    - Chongqing Music 88.1 FM
    - Chongqing City 93.8 FM
    - Chongqing Literary Radio 103.5 FM
- Anhui Province
  - Anhui Radio and Television Station
    - The Voice of Anhui
    - Economic Radio
    - Music Radio
    - City Voice
    - Traffic Broadcast
    - Rural Radio
    - Fiction Storytelling Radio
    - Opera Broadcasting
    - Travel Radio
- Fujian Province
  - Fujian Media Group
    - Fujian News Radio
    - South East Radio
    - Fujian Economy Radio
    - Fujian Traffic Radio
    - Fujian Urban Radio
    - Fujian Music Radio
- Guangdong Province
  - Guangdong Radio and Television
    - Radio Guangdong
      - Radio Guangdong News Station
      - Pearl Radio Economic Station
      - Radio Guangdong Music FM
      - Radio Guangdong Voice of the City
      - Southern Life Radio
      - Guanzhou Traffic Radio
      - Stock Market Radio
      - Voice Of Southern Guangdong
- Gansu province
  - Gansu Media Group
    - Gansu News Radio
    - Gansu Traffic Radio
    - Gansu Children's Radio
    - Gansu City FM
    - Gansu Economy Radio 93.4 FM
    - Gansu Rural Radio
- Guangxi
  - Guangxi People's Broadcasting Station
    - News 910 FM91 AM792 (Guangxi News Radio)
    - Female Radio 970 FM97 AM1224 (Guangxi Women Radio)
    - Private Car 930 FM93 (Guangxi Urban Radio)
    - Guangxi Music Radio FM95
    - Guangxi Traffic Radio FM100.3
    - Beibu Bay Radio FM96.3 AM846 (Shortwave Foreign Broadcasts)
- Guizhou Province
  - Guizhou Radio & TV
    - Guizhou News Radio
    - Guizhou Economy Radio
    - Guizhou Music Radio
    - Guizhou Urban Radio
    - Guizhou Traffic Radio
    - Guizhou Tourism Radio
    - Guizhou Story Radio
- Henan Province
  - Henan Radio Network
    - Henan News Radio
    - Henan Economic Radio
    - Henan Traffic Radio
    - Henan Music Radio
    - Henan Story Radio
- Hubei Province
  - Hubei Radio and Television
    - Hubei News Radio
    - Hubei Economy Radio
    - Hubei Classical Music Radio
    - Hubei Traffic Music Radio
    - Hubei Life Health Radio
    - Hubei Women Radio
    - Hubei Traffic Radio
    - Hubei Metro Music Radio
    - Hubei Information Radio
    - Hubei Rural Radio
- Hebei Province
  - Hebei Radio Network
    - Hebei News Radio
    - Hebei Economic Radio
    - Hebei Traffic Radio
    - Hebei Literary Radio
    - Hebei Life Radio
    - Hebei Music Radio
    - Hebei Farmers Radio
    - Hebei Tourism Radio
- Heilongjiang Province
  - Heilongjiang Radio Network
    - Heilongjiang News Radio
    - Heilongjiang Traffic Radio
    - Heilongjiang Life Radio
    - Heilongjiang Music Radio
    - Heilongjiang Urban Women Radio
    - Heilongjiang Loving Channel
    - Heilongjiang College Radio
    - Heilongjiang Korean Radio
    - Heilongjiang Voice of Northern Wilderness
- Hunan Province
  - Hunan Radio
    - Hunan Communication Radio 91.8FM
    - Hunan Economy Radio 90.1FM
    - Hunan News Radio 102.8FM
    - Hunan Music Radio 89.3FM
    - Hunan Modern Music Radio 97.5FM
    - Hunan tourism Radio 106.9FM
    - Hunan Life Radio 93.8FM
- Hainan
  - Hainan News Radio (FM88.6)
  - Hainan Traffic Radio (FM100)
  - Hainan Music Radio (FM94.5)
  - International Tourism Island Voice (FM103.8)
  - Hainan People ’s Livelihood Radio (FM101)
- Jilin Province
  - Jilin Broadcasting Network
    - Jilin News Radio
    - Jilin Traffic Radio
    - Jilin Economic Radio
    - Jilin Rural Radio
    - Jilin Music Radio
    - Jilin Information Radio
    - Jilin Health Entertainment Radio
    - Jilin Tourism Radio
    - Jilin Educational Radio
- Jiangsu Province
  - Jiangsu Radio Network
    - Jiangsu News Radio 97.2FM
    - Jiangsu Traffic Radio 106.8FM
    - Jiangsu Life Radio 91.1FM
    - Jiangsu Music Radio 99.0FM
    - Jiangsu Economic Radio 101.4FM
    - Jiangsu Literary Radio 104.6FM
    - Jiangsu Metro Music Radio 94.5FM
- Jiangxi Province
- Inner Mongolia
  - Inner Mongolia News Radio (FM95)
  - Inner Mongolia Chinese News Integrated Radio (FM89)
  - Inner Mongolia Traffic Voice (FM105.6)
  - Inner Mongolia Music Voice (FM93.6)
  - Inner Mongolia Economic Radio (FM101.4)
  - Inner Mongolia Mongolian language broadcast (FM95.9)
  - Inner Mongolia storytelling music broadcast (FM102.8)
  - Inner Mongolia green field voice (FM91.9)
  - Inner Mongolia grassland voice (FM105 )
- Liaoning
  - Liaoning Radio and Television
    - Liaoning News Radio
    - Liaoning Economic Radio
    - Liaoning Literary Radio
    - Liaoning Traffic Radio
    - Liaoning Rural Radio
    - Liaoning Info Radio (Available in Dalian City)
- Ningxia
  - Ningxia Radio and Television
    - Ningxia News Radio 891 AM
    - Ningxia Traffic Radio
    - Ningxia Economic Radio
    - Ningxia Urban Radio
- Qinghai Province
- Sichuan Province
  - Sichuan Radio and Television
    - Sichuan Voice
    - Sichuan Fortune Broadcasting
    - Sichuan Ethnic Broadcasting
    - Minjiang Music Radio
    - Sichuan Traffic Radio
    - Sichuan Literature and Art Broadcasting
    - Sichuan News Broadcasting
    - City Sound
    - Sichuan private car radio
- Shandong
  - Shandong Radio & TV Station
    - Shandong News Radio
    - Shandong Economy 594 AM / 96FM
    - Shandong Female Anchor Radio
    - Shandong Life Radio
    - Shandong Traffic Radio
    - Shandong Rural Radio
    - Shandong Music Radio
    - Shandong Sports Radio
- Shaanxi Province
- Shanxi
  - Shanxi Radio and Television
    - Shanxi News Radio (90.4 FM)
    - Shanxi Economic Radio (95.8 FM)
    - Shanxi Art and Culture Radio (101.5 FM)
    - Shanxi Traffic Radio (88.0 FM)
    - Shanxi Health Radio (105.9 FM)
    - Shanxi Rural Radio (603 AM)
    - Shanxi Music Radio (94.0 FM)
- Xinjiang
  - Xinjiang Integrated Radio Sunshine 895 (FM89.5)
  - Xinjiang News Radio (FM96.1)
  - Xinjiang Traffic Radio (FM94.9)
  - Xinjiang Story Radio (FM102.8)
  - Xinjiang Private Car Radio (FM92.9)
  - Xinjiang Music Broadcasting (FM103.9)
  - Xinjiang People's Livelihood Broadcasting (FM92.4)
  - Xinjiang Uyghur Integrated Broadcasting (FM101.7)
  - Xinjiang Uyghur Traffic and Arts Broadcasting (FM107.4)
  - Xinjiang Kazakh Broadcasting (FM98.2)
  - Xinjiang Mongolian Broadcasting Xinjiang Kirgiz Broadcasting
- Tibet
  - Tibetan News Comprehensive Broadcasting (FM101.6)
  - Chinese News Comprehensive Broadcasting (FM93.3)
  - Tibetan Kangba Broadcasting (FM103.0)
  - Urban Life Broadcasting (FM98.0)
  - Tibetan Science Education Broadcasting (FM106.3)
- Yunnan Province
  - Yunnan News Radio (FM105.8)
  - Yunnan Private Car Radio (FM88.7)
  - Yunnan Traffic Radio (FM91.8)
  - Yunnan Music Radio (FM97)
  - Shangri-La Voice (FM99)
  - Yunnan Children's Broadcasting (FM101.7)
  - Yunnan Education Broadcasting (FM100)
  - Yunnan National Broadcasting (SW7210)
  - Yunnan International Broadcasting (SW6035)
- Zhejiang
  - Zhejiang Radio and Television Group
    - Zhejiang News Radio
    - Zhejiang Economy 95.0 FM
    - Zhejiang Culture 99.6 FM
    - Zhejiang Music 96.8 FM
    - Zhejiang Traffic Radio 93 FM
    - ZheJiang Female Radio 104.5 FM
    - ZheJiang Sound City 107

== Chile ==
none

== Colombia ==
Radio Nacional de Colombia

- Radio Nacional

== Congo (Republic) ==
Radiodiffusion Télévision Congolaise

- Radio Brazzaville

== Costa Rica ==
Radio Nacional )

- 101.5 Costa Rica Radio

== Croatia ==
HRT - Hrvatski Radio

- HR1
- HR2
- HR3
- 9 regional studios
  - Radio Dubrovnik
  - Radio Knin
  - Radio Osijek (includes Hungarian language programs "Eszéki Rádió")
  - Radio Pula (includes Italian language programs "Radio Pola")
  - Radio Rijeka (includes Italian language programs "Radio Fiume")
  - Radio Sljeme
  - Radio Split
  - Radio Zadar

== Cuba ==
ICRT - Instituto Cubano de Radio y Televisión

- Radio Rebelde - news, music, sport
- Radio Progresso - entertainment
- Radio Taíno - turism
- Radio Reloj - all-news
- Radio Enciclopedia - soft music
- CMBF Radio Musical Nacional - fine music, culture
- Provincial stations
  - Radio Victoria
- Municipal stations
  - Radio Granma

== Cyprus ==
CyBC / RIK - Cyprus Broadcasting Corporation - Ραδιοφωνικό Ίδρυμα Κύπρου

- RIK1 Proto - Greek (includes one program for Manorites in Greek)
- RIK2 Deftero - Turkish, English, Armenian
- RIK3 Trito - Greek
- RIK4 Classic - Classical music

=== Northern Cyprus ("Turkish Republic of Northern Cyprus") ===
Territory under Turkish military occupation

BRT - Bayrak Radyo Televizyon Kurumu

- Bayrak Radyosu - Generic
- Bayrak International - pop+News in foreign languages, English, Greek
- Bayrak FM - pop
- Bayrak Klasik - classical
- Bayrak Türk Müziği - Turkish music
- Bayrak Radyo Haber - News in foreign languages

== Czech Republic ==
Český rozhlas

- Radiožurnál - pop+news (includes weekly Romani language programs)
- Dvojka - pop
- Vltava - classical
- Plus - talk
- Several internet-only channels
- 13 regional studios
  - ČRo Brno
  - ČRo České Budějovice
  - ČRo Hradec Králové
  - ČRo Karlovy Vary
  - ČRo Liberec
  - ČRo Olomouc
  - ČRo Ostrava (includes Polish language programs "Radio Czeskie w Ostrawie")
  - ČRo Pardubice
  - ČRo Plzeň
  - ČRo Rádio Praha
  - ČRo Sever
  - ČRo Střední Čechy
  - ČRo Vysočina
  - ČRo Zlín

== Denmark ==
DR - Danmarks Radio

- P1 - Talk
- P2 - Classical
- P3 - Youth pop
- P4 - Regional studios
  - DR Bornholm
  - DR Esbjerg
  - DR Fyn
  - DR København
  - DR Midt & Vest
  - DR Nordjylland
  - DR Nordvestsjælland
  - DR Sjælland
  - DR Syd
  - DR Trekanten
  - DR Østjylland
- P5 - Music for elderly (DAB)
- P6 beat - Popular music (DAB)
- P8 jazz - jazz (DAB)

Faroe Islands

KVF Kringvarp Føroya

- KVF Útvarp (in Faroesen language)

=== Greenland ===
KNR - Kalaallit Nunaata Radioa

- KNR

== Djibouti ==
RTD - Radio Television of Djibouti

- FM91.3

== Dominica ==
DBS - Dominica Broadcasting Corporation

- DBS Radio - English
- Blaze

== Dominican Republic ==
CERTV - Corporacion Estatal de Radio y Television

- Dominicana FM - news talk caribbean music
- Quisqeya - Latin music
- Radio Santo Domingo - Dominican music

== DR Congo ==
RTNC - Radio-Télévision nationale congolaise

- RTNC Chaîne nationale
- RTNC Kinshasa
- RTNC Bandundu
- RTNC Bukavu
- RTNC Goma
- RTNC Kat (Lubumbashi)
- RTNC Kindu
- RTNC Kisangani
- RTNC MbujiMayi
- RTNC Mbandaka

== Ecuador ==
Radio Publica de Ecuador

- Pública FM

== East Timor ==
RTL- Radio-Televisão Timor Leste

- Radio Timor Leste - Tetum, Portuguese

== Egypt ==
ERTU - Egyptian Radio and Television Union (إتحاد الإذاعة والتلفزيون المصري Itteh'ad Al-Edhaa'a wa at-Televezyon al-Mis'ri)

- General Programme Radio (إذاعة البرنامج العام)
- Voice of the Arabs (إذاعة صوت العرب) - Pan-Arab
- Cultural Radio (إذاعة البرنامج الثقافي)
- Middle East Radio (إذاعة الشرق الأوسط)
- European Program Radio (إذاعة البرنامج الأوروبي)
- Youth and Sports Radio (إذاعة الشباب والرياضة)
- Radio Greater Cairo (إذاعة القاهرة الكبرى)
- Songs Radio (إذاعة الأغاني)
- News and Music Radio (إذاعة الأخبار والموسيقى)
- Radio Masr or Egypt Radio (إذاعة راديو مصر)
- Al Qur'an al Karim Radio (إذاعة القران الكريم)
- Educational Radio (الإذاعة التعليمية)
- Voice of Palestine (صوت فلسطين)
- North of Saaeed Radio (إذاعة شمال الصعيد)
- Nile Valley Radio (إذاعة وادي النيل)
- Middle Delta Radio (إذاعة وسط الدلتا)
- Radio Alexandria (إذاعة الإسكندرية)

== El Salvador ==
- Radio Nacional de El Salvador

== Equatorial Guinea ==
Radio Nacional de Guinea Ecuatorial

- Radio 1 - Siswati
- Radio 2 - English

== Eritrea ==
Dimtsi Hafash Eritrea (Voice of the Broad Masses of Eritrea / ድምጺ ሓፋሽ)

- Dimtsi Hafash

== Estonia ==
ERR - Eesti Rahvusringhääling

- Vikerraadio ("rainbow") - Talk
- Raadio 2 - Pop
- Klassikaraadio - Classical
- Raadio 4 - Russian
- Raadio Tallinn - News, music

== Eswatini ==
Swaziland Broadcasting and Information Services

== Ethiopia ==
EBC - Ethiopian Broadcasting Corporation

- Ethiopian National Radio 93.1
- FM Addis 97.1
- EBC FM 104.3

== Falkland Islands ==
Falkland Islands Radio Service

- Falklands Radio - English

== Fiji ==
FBS - Fiji Broadcasting Corporation

- Radio One - i Taukei / Fijian
- Mirchi FM - Hindi - Hindi pop music
- Gold FM - English - commercial - 70-90s music
- Bula FM - Fijian - commercial
- 2day FM - English - commercial - youth pop
- Radio Two - Hindi - news talk religion music

== Finland ==
YLE - Yleisradio Oy (Swedish: Rundradion Ab)

- Yle Radio 1 - classical music, culture (includes regional programs, and Romani language program)
- YleX - Pop, youth
- Yle Radio Suomi - Entertainment, news
- Yle Sámi radio - Sami
- Yle Vega - Swedish, produced by Svenska Yle
- Yle X3M - Swedish song, produced by Svenska Yle

Åland

Ålands Radio och TV Ab

- Ålands Radio (Swedish)

== France ==
Radio France

- France Inter - generalis
- France Info - news
- France Culture - cultural
- France Musique - art music
- FIP
- Mouv' - youth music
- Ici (formerly France Bleu) - regional studios
  - ici Alsace
  - ici Armorique
  - ici Auxerre
  - ici Azur
  - ici Béarn Bigorre
  - ici Belfort-Montbéliard
  - ici Berry
  - ici Besançon
  - ici Bourgogne
  - ici Breizh Izel (includes Breton / Brezhoneg language programs)
  - ici Champagne-Ardenne
  - ici Cotentin
  - ici Creuse
  - ici Drôme Ardèche
  - ici Elsass (includes Alsatian / Elsässisch language programs)
  - ici Gard Lozère
  - ici Gascogne
  - ici Gironde
  - ici Hérault
  - ici Isère
  - ici La Rochelle
  - ici Limousin
  - ici Loire Océan
  - ici Lorraine (Moselle - Pays Haut)
  - ici Lorraine (Meurthe-et-Moselle - Vosges)
  - ici Maine
  - ici Mayenne
  - ici Nord
  - ici Normandie (Calvados - Orne)
  - ici Normandie (Seine-Maritime - Eure)
  - ici Occitanie
  - ici Orléans
  - ici Paris Île-de-France
  - ici Pays Basque (includes Basque / Euskara language programs "Euskal Herria")
  - ici Pays d'Auvergne
  - ici Pays de Savoie
  - ici Périgord (includes Occitan language programs)
  - ici Picardie
  - ici Poitou
  - ici Provence
  - ici RCFM (Radio Corsica Frequenza Mora, includes Corsican / Corsu language programs)
  - ici Roussillon (includes Catalan / Català language programs)
  - ici Saint-Étienne Loire
  - ici Touraine
  - ici Vaucluse

France Médias France - international stations

- RFI
- Monte Carlo Doualiya

France Télévisions - overseas stations

- Guadeloupe La Première
- Guyane La Première
- Martinique La Première
- Mayotte La Première
- Nouvelle-Calédonie La Première
- Polynésie La Première
- Réunion La Première
- Saint-Pierre-et-Miquelon La Première
- Wallis-et-Futuna La Première

== French Polynesia ==
Radio France

- Polinesie 1

== Gabon ==
RTG - Radiodiffusion-Television Gabonaise

Africa Radio

== Gambia ==
GRTS - Gambia Radio & Television Service

- Radio Gambia - English

== Georgia ==
GPB - Georgian Public Broadcasting (Sakartvelos Sazogadoebrivi Mauts'q'ebeli საქართველოს საზოგადოებრივი მაუწყებელი)

- FM 102.3 - talk, news
- FM 100.9 - music

== Germany ==
Deutschlandradio

- Deutschlandfunk
- Deutschlandfunk Kultur
- Deutschlandfunk Nova

WDR - Westdeutscher Rundfunk — Cologne

- 1LIVE
- WDR 2
  - WDR 2 Aachen (Aachen)
  - WDR 2 Rhein-Ruhr (Düsseldorf)
  - WDR 2 Rhineland (Cologne)
  - WDR 2 Bergisches Land (Wuppertal)
  - WDR 2 Ruhrgebiet (Dortmund)
  - WDR 2 Südwestfalen (Siegen)
  - WDR 2 Münsterland (Münster)
  - WDR 2 Ostwestfalen-Lippe (Bielefeld)
- WDR 3
- WDR 4
- WDR 5
- COSMO( Radio Bremen, rbb, and WDR)

NDR - Norddeutscher Rundfunk — Hamburg

- NDR1
  - NDR 90,3 (Hamburg)
  - NDR 1 Niedersachsen (Hannover)
  - NDR 1 Welle Nord (Schleswig-Holstein (Kiel))
  - NDR 1 Radio MV (Mecklenburg-Vorpommern (Schwerin))
  - NDR 2
- NDR Kultur
- NDR Info
- NDR Info Spezial
- NDR Blue
- NDR Plus
- N-JOY

MDR - Mitteldeutscher Rundfunk — Leipzig

- MDR
  - MDR Sachsen (Dresden)
    - Serbski Rozhłós (Upper Sorbian language program) (Budyšín / Bautzen)
  - MDR Sachsen-Anhalt (Magdeburg)
  - MDR Thüringen (Erfurt)
- MDR Jump
- MDR Kultur
- MDR Aktuell
- MDR Sputnik
- MDR Klassik
- MDR Schlagerwelt
- MDR Tweens

BR - Bayerischer Rundfunk — Munich

- Bayern 1
  - Bayern 1 Franken (Nürnberg)
  - Bayern 1 Mainfranken (Würzburg)
  - Bayern 1 Niederbayern/Oberpfalz (Regensburg)
  - Bayern 1 Oberbayern (Funkhaus München)
  - Bayern 1 Schwaben (Regionalstudio Augsburg)
- Bayern 2
- Bayern 3
- BR-Klassik
- BR24

SWR - Südwestrundfunk — Stuttgart

- SWR 1
  - SWR1 Baden-Württemberg (Stuttgart)
  - SWR1 Rheinland-Pfalz (Mainz)
- SWR 2
- SWR 3
- SWR 4
- DASDING
- SWR Aktuell

rbb - Rundfunk Berlin-Brandenburg — Berlin

- rbb 88.8 (for Berlin)
- Radioeins
- Antenne Brandenburg (for Brandenburg)
  - Sorbischer Rundfunk / Bramborske Serbske Radijo (Lower Sorbian language) (Cottbus)
- Fritz
- rbbKultur
- rbb24 Inforadio
- COSMO( Radio Bremen, rbb, and WDR)

hr - Hessischer Rundfunk — Frankfurt

- hr1
- hr2-kultur
- hr3
- hr4
- hr-info

SR - Saarländischer Rundfunk — Saarbrücken

- SR 1 Europawelle
- SR 2 Kulturadio
- SR 3 Saarlandwelle
- Antenne Saar

Radio Bremen — Bremen

- Bremen Eins
- Bremen Zwei
- Bremen Vier
- Bremen Next
- COSMO( Radio Bremen, rbb, and WDR)

== Ghana ==
GBC - Ghana Broadcasting Corporation

- Uniiq FM - Accra
- and 14 local stations

== Greece ==
ERT - Ελληνική Ραδιοφωνία Τηλεόραση - Ellinikí Radiofonía Tileórasi

- Program 1 (Proto) (=ERT News Radio) - news talk
- Program 2 (Deftero) - Greek music
- Program 3 (Trito) - classical music arts
- ERA Sport - sports
- Kosmos 93.6 - world music
- Thessaloniki
  - 958FM - music and culture
  - 102 FM Makenonia - news
- “Περιφερειακοί” (Regional/Peripheral)
  - ERA Komotini (Thrace) — 98.1 FM
  - ERA Kavala
  - ERA Xanthi / Orestiada (Evros)
  - ERA Serres
  - ERA Florina
  - ERA Kozani
  - ERA Larissa
  - ERA Volos
  - ERA Patras (Peloponnese)
  - ERA Ioannina (Epirus)
  - ERA Kalamata
  - ERA Tripoli
  - ERA Pyrgos
  - ERA Chania (Crete)
  - ERA Heraklion (Crete)
  - ERA Kerkira (Corfu)
  - ERA South Aegean (Rhodes)

== Grenada ==
GBN Grenada Broadcasting Network

- Klassic radio
- HOTT FM

== Guadeloupe ==
France Télévisions

- Guadeloupe La Première

== Guam ==
KPRG

== Guatemala ==
none

== Guinea ==
RTG - Radio Télévision Guinéenne

- RTG Guinee 88.5 - French

== Guinea-Bissau ==
National Broadcasting of Guinea-Bissau

== Guyana ==
National Communications Network (NCN)

- Voice of Guyana
- Fresh FM
- Hot FM

== Haiti ==
none

== Holy See ==
Vatican Radio / Radio Vaticana

- Multilanguage programs

== Honduras ==
none

== Hong Kong ==
RTHK - Radio Television Hong Kong

- Radio 1 - Cantonese news talk
- Radio 2 - Cantonese culture entertainment family music
- Radio 3 - English news and music
- Radio 4 - English classical music
- Radio 5 - Cantonese Chinese opera, elderly, children, education
- Radio 6 - Cantonese / Mandarin China Central Radio Hong Kong
- Radio Putongha - Mandarin Economy, rebroadcasts Community Involvement Broadcasting Service (CIBS)

== Hungary ==
Duna Media Service (MTVA - Media Service Support and Asset Management Fund):

- Kossuth - News talk
- Petőfi - Pop
- Bartók - Classical
- Dankó - Folk
- Nemzetiségi - Ethnic (AM only) (Serbian, Romanian, Slovak, Croatian, German, Boyash (beás), Bulgarian, Romani (lovári), Rusyn, Greek, Armenian, Polish, Ukrainian language programs and Roma (romungro) ethnic program in Roma-Hungarian)
- Parlamenti - Parliament (online only)
- Nemzeti Sportrádió (FM)

== Iceland ==
RÚV - Ríkisútvarpið

- RÁS1 - news talk
- RÁS2 - pop rock (with regional news)
- Rondó - online
- RÚV English Radio (online podcast)
- RÚV Polski (Islandzkiej Rozgłośni Radiowo-Telewizyjnej, online, written news service)

== India ==
AIR - All India Radio / Akashvani

- Vividh Bharati
- FM Gold
- FM Rainbow
- Regional and local services
- Urdu Service

== Indonesia ==
RRI - Radio Republik Indonesia

- RRI PRO 1 - Regional
- RRI PRO 2 - Music
- RRI PRO 3 - News
- RRI PRO 4 - Traditional
- RRI PRO 5 - Music

== Iran ==
IRIB - Islamic Republic of Iran Broadcasting

- Radio Iran
- Radio Farhang - Culture
- Radio Payam - Entertain.
- Radio Quran
- Radio Maaref - Education
- Radio Javan - Youth
- Radio Varzesh - Sports
- Radio Salamat - Health
- Radio Eghtesad - Economy
- Radio Namayesh - Arts
- Radio Ava - Music
- Radio Goftogoo - Interviews
- and tens of provincial stations

== Iraq ==
Al Iraqiya

- Radio Republic of Iraq
- Holy Quran Radio

== Ireland ==
RTÉ - Raidió Teilifís Éireann

- Radio 1 - Speech, music
- 2FM - CHR
- Lyric FM - Classical
- Raidió na Gaeltachta - Irish Speech, music

== Isle of Man ==
Manx Radio / Radio Vannin (public, also carrying advertisements; in English/Manx Gaelic)

== Israel ==
IPBC /KAN - Israeli public broadcasting corporation

- Kan 88 - Hebrew - Jazz
- Kan Kol Hamusica - Hebrew - Classical
- Kan Reka - Russian+others - Immigrant network
- Kan Tarbut "Here is Culture" - Hebrew - talk culture
- Kan Bet - Hebrew - news current affairs
- Kan Gimmel - Hebrew - Israeli music, news
- Makan - Arabic
- Kan Moreshet - Hebrew - Religious

== Italy ==
RAI - Radiotelevisione Italianate

- Radio 1 - news, talk
  - Regional news services
  - GR Abruzzo (L'Aquila)
  - GR Basilicata (Potenza)
  - GR Calabria (Catanzaro)
  - GR Campania (Napoli)
  - GR Emilia Romagna (Bologna)
  - GR Friuli Venezia Giulia (Trieste)
  - GR Lazio (Roma)
  - GR Liguria (Genova)
  - GR Lombardia (Milano)
  - GR Marche (Ancona)
  - GR Molise (Campobasso)
  - GR Piemonte (Torino)
  - GR Puglia (Bari)
  - GR Sardegna (Cagliari)
  - GR Sicilia (Palermo)
  - GR Toscana (Firenze)
  - GR Trentino Alto Adige (Trento)
  - GR Umbria (Perugia)
  - GR Valle d'Aosta (Aosta)
  - GR Veneto (Venezia)
- Radio 2 - music, entertainment
- Radio 3 - culture, classical music, concerts
- Rai Isoradio - traffic
- Rai Gr Parlamento - parliament
- Rai Radio 3 Classica - opera, operetta
- Regional services:
  - Rai Südtirol (German language programs)
  - Rai Radio Trst A (Slovene language programs)
  - Rai Friuli Venezia Giulia
    - Rai Friuli Venezia Giulia (Italian)
    - Rai Friûl Vignesie Julie (in Friulian)
    - Rai Furlanija Julijska Krajina (in Slovene)
  - Rai Vd'A (Italian, French and Valdôtain programs)

== Ivory Coast ==
RTI - Radiodiffusion Television Ivoirienne

- La Nationale - News talk
- Fréquence 2 - Light entertainment

== Japan ==
NHK - Nippon Hōsō Kyōkai 日本放送協会

- NHK AM - news, talk
- NHK FM - concerts, classical music

Note: online radio streams can only be accessed from a Japanese IP address

== Jordan ==
JRTV - Jordan Radio and Television Corporation

- Radio Jordan
- Amman FM

== Kazakhstan ==
Qazaqstan Radio and Television Corporation

- Qazaq Radiosy - Kazakh and other languages
- Radio Astana - Information, music
- Radio Classic - Classical music
- Radio Shalqar - Kazakh language

== Kenya ==
KBC - Kenya Broadcasting Corporation

- Radio Taifa - Swahili
- English service - English
- Coro FM - Kikuyu
- Minto FM - Kisii
- Mayienga FM - Luo
- Iftiin Fm - Somali
- Ingo FM - Luhya

== Kosovo ==
RTK - Radio Televizioni i Kosovës

- Radio Kosova - Albanian
- Radio Kosova 2 - Serbian, Romani, Albanian, Turkish and other languages

== Kuwait ==
Ministry of information/Kuwait Radio

- Radio Kuwait 1
- Kuwait Radio 2
- Kuwait Radio Quran
- Kuwait FM
- Easy FM 92.5
- Radio Classical Arabic
- Radio Hona Kuwait
- Radio Shaabya
- SuperStation

== Kyrgyzstan ==
Kyrgyz Radiosu

- Birinchi Radio
- Kyrgyz Radio
- Myn Kyal FM
- Dostuk FM

== Laos ==
Lao National Radio

- LNR Radio 1
- LNR VIP
- LNR Radio Phoenix

== Latvia ==
LR - Latvijas Radio of the Latvijas Sabiedriskais medijs (LSM)

- LR1 Latvian - talk news
- LR2 Latvian - youth Latvian pop
- LR3 Klasika - classical jazz
- Latvijas Radio 4 - Russian, dropped on 1.1. 2026 (Russian, Ukrainian and English content available on the website as written news)
- Latvijas Radio 5 – pieci.lv - pop
- Latvijas Radio 6, or Radio Naba - University freeform

== Lebanon ==
Radio Lebanon (راديو لبنان)

== Lesotho ==
LNBS - Lesotho National Broadcasting Service

- Radio Leshoto - Seshoto, English
- Ultimate Radio 99.8FM - Seshoto, English - Commercial

== Liberia ==
LBC - Liberia Broadcasting System

- LBC

== Libya ==
none

== Lithuania ==
LRT - Lithuanian National Radio and Television / Lietuvos nacionalinis radijas ir televizija

- LRT Radijas - news, talk, music
- LRT Klasika - classical (includes Polish language programs)
- LRT Opus - alternative music
- English, Russian and Polish written news available on the website

== Luxembourg ==
Radio Letzebuerg

- Radio 100.7

== Macao ==
TDM - Teledifusao de Macau

- Radio Macau - Portuguese
- Radio Macau 澳門電台 - Chinese
- TDM Ou Mun - Chinese
- Canal Macau - Chinese
- TDM Informacao - Chinese
- TDM Desporto - Chinese
- TDM Entretenimento - Chinese

== Malawi ==
MBC - Malawi Broadcasting Corporation

- Radio 1
- Radio 2

== Malaysia ==
RTM - Radio Televisyen Malaysia

- Radio Klasik - Classic hits
- Nasional FM
- TraXX FM - English
- Ai FM - Mandarin
- Minnal FM - Indian
- Asyik FM - Orang Asli
- RTM Local Stations

== Maldives ==
Voice of Maldives

- Raajje FM
- Radio 1 (Radio Eke)
- Radio 2*

== Mali ==
ORTM - Office de Radiodiffusion-Télévision du Mali

- ORTM Nationale - French, Bambara
- Chiffre II

== Malta ==
PBS - Public Broadcasting Services

- Radiju Malta - news
- Magic Malta - music
- Radiju Malta 2 - diverse

== Mauritania ==
Radio Mauritanie

- Radio Nationale - Arabic French

== Mauritius ==
MBC - Mauritius Broadcasting Corporation

- Radio Maurice - Creole, French, Chinese
- Radio Mauritius - Hindi
- Best FM - Hindi, English
- Kool FM - Creole, French, English
- Taal FM - Hindi, Bhojpuri, Chinese
- Rodrigues AM, FM - Creole, French (local)

== Mexico ==
IMER - Instituto Mexicano de la Radio

- Radio Ciudadana - world music
- Tropicalísima - salsa, cumbia, merengue
- Opus94 - classical
- Reactor - rock
- Horizonte - jazz
- Radio 7 - banda, mariachi, nortena, grupera
- La B Grande de Mexico - bolero, balada
- Yucatán - regional
- Estero Istmo - regional - news
- plus other regional services

== Moldova ==
RM - TeleRadio Moldova

- Radio Moldova - talk (includes Bulgarian and Russian language programs)
- Radio Moldova Tineret - pop
- Radio Moldova Musical - classical
- Radio Moldova Comrat - Gagauz language

Autonomous Territorial Unit of Gagauzia

- GRT - Găgăuziya Radio Televizionu / GRT FM (Russian, Gagauz language programs)

Transnistria ("Pridnestrovian Moldavian Republic") Breakaway state internationally recognised as part of Moldova

- PGTRK - Приднестровская Государственная Телерадиокомпания Ра́дио Приднестро́вья / Radio 1 (in Russian, with some Romanian language programs)

== Monaco ==
- Radio Monaco

== Mongolia ==
MNB - Mongolian National Broadcaster (Монголын Үндэсний Олон Нийтийн Радио Телевиз)

- Монголын радио
- P3 ФМ 100.9
- Voice of Mongolia

== Montenegro ==
RTCG - Radio Televizija Crne Gore

- RCG (=RCG1) (includes Albanian language newscasts)
- Radio 98 (=RCG2) - youth program

== Montserrat ==
Radio Montserrat (ZJB)

== Morocco ==
SNRT - Société nationale de radiodiffusion et de télévision

- Al Watania (red logo) (National)
- Chaîne Inter (lilac logo)
- Al Amazighia
- Radio Mohammed VI du Quran
- FM Casablanca
- FM Tanger
- FM Marrakech
- FM Laâyounne
- FM Fes

== Mozambique ==
Rádio Moçambique

- Antena Nacional
- Emissor Provincial de Gaza
- Emissor Provincial de Sofala
- RM Desporto
- Emissor Provincial de Napula

== Myanmar ==
MRTV - Myanmar Radio and Television

- Cherry FM
- Mandalay FM
- Myanmar National Radio
- Padamyar FM
- Pyinsawaddy FM
- Shwe FM

== Namibia ==
NBC - Namibian Broadcasting Corporation

- National FM - English
- Funkhaus Namibia - German
- Hartklop FM - Afrikaans
- and 6 other language programs

== Nauru ==
Nauru Broadcasting Service

- Radio Nauru

== Nepal ==
- Radio Nepal

== Netherlands ==
NPO - Nederlandse Publieke Omroep

- Radio 1 - News Talk
- Radio 2 - 70-90s pop
- 3FM - youth pop rock
- Klassiek - classical music
- Radio 5 - music for elder generation
- FunX - music
- Campus Radio - "The training station of public broadcasting"

RPO (Stichting Regionale Publieke Omroep)

- RTV Noord (includes Low Saxon (Nedersaksisch) programs)
- Omrop Fryslân (Frisian language)
- RTV Drenthe (includes Low Saxon (Nedersaksisch) programs)
- NH Media
- Omroep Flevoland
- RTV Oost (includes Low Saxon (Nedersaksisch) programs)
- RTV Utrecht
- Omroep Gelderland
- Omroep West
- Omroep Rijnmond
- Omroep Zeeland
- Omroep Brabant
- L1 (Limburg) (includes programs in Limburgish dialect)

== New Caledonia ==
Radio France

- Nouvelle-Calédonie La Première

== New Zealand ==
RNZ - Radio New Zealand

- National - news and current affairs
- Concert - fine music
- Pacific - shortwave pacific islands service
- AM Network - parliament

== Nicaragua ==
Radio Nicaragua

== Niger ==
ORTN - Office de radiodiffusion et Télévision du Niger

- Voix du Sahel

== Nigeria ==
FRNC - Federal Radio Corporation of Nigeria

- FRCN HQ
- FRCN Lagos
- FRCN Ibadan
- FRCN Kaduna
- Radio 1 Lagos
- Coal City FM Enugu South East Zonal Station

== Niue ==
BCN - Broadcasting Corporation of Niue

- Radio Sunshine

== North Korea ==
KCBS Korean Central Broadcasting Station / Chosŏn Chungang Pangsong / 조선 중앙 방송

- KCBS Pyongyang Pangsong
- KCBS Pyongyang FM Pangsong
- KCBS Chosun Jungang Pangsong

PBS Pyongyang Broadcasting Station (for South Korea)

Unified Echo Broadcasting Station 통일 의 메아리 방송 (for South Korea)

== North Macedonia ==
MRT - Makedonsko Radio - Македонско Радио

- MR1 Radio Skopje (Radio 1) - Talk
- MR2 Македонско Радио 2 - Music
- MR3 Radio Maqedonisë 3 - Albanian, Roma, Turkish, Serbian, Bosniak, Romanian

== Northern Mariana Islands ==
KRNM

== Norway ==
NRK - Norsk rikskringkasting

All stations are DAB/digital only

- NRK P1 - regional
- NRK P1+ - adult
- NRK P2 - cultural
- NRK P3 - youth
- NRK mP3 - music
- NRK P3X - music
- NRK P13 - rock and indie music
- NRK Jazz - jazz
- NRK Klassisk - classical music
- NRK Sápmi - Sami
- NRK Alltid Nyheter - all news
- NRK Super - children
- NRK Folkemusikk - folk
- NRK Stortinget - Storting
- NRK Sports - sport

== Oman ==
Sultanate of Oman Radio

- FM General الإذاعة العامة
- Holy Quran Radio إذاعة القرآن الكريم
- Youth Radio إذاعة الشباب
- English Radio الإذاعة الإنجليزية
- The voice of Oman صوت عمان

== Pakistan ==
Radio Pakistan

- Saut-ul-Quran
- Islamabad Station
- NCAC
- World Service
- Hyderabad
- External Service
- Dhanak
- FM-93-Faisalabad
- Faisalabad-FM-101
- FM 93 Rawalpindi
- FM 101 Islamabad
- FM 101 Mirpur
- FM 101 Karachi
- FM 101 Peshawar
- FM-101-Lahore
- FM 101 Quetta
- Mianwali
- Peshawar
- Quetta
- Lahore-MW
- AK-RADIO-MIRPUR
- AK-RADIO-Tarakhel
- PBC Gilgit (MW)

== Palau ==
T8AA (AM)

T8AA-FM

== Palestine ==
Palestinian Broadcasting Corporation

- Voice of Palestine

=== Gaza ===
- AlAqsa (Hamas)

== Panama ==
Sistema Estatal de Radio y Televisión

- Nacional FM
- Crisol FM

== Papua New Guinea ==
NBC/PNG - National Broadcasting Corporation of Papua New Guinea

- NBC Radio PNG

== Paraguay ==
Radio Nacional de Paraguay

- Asuncion 920
- Asuncion 95.1
- Pilar 700
- San Pedro 105.5

== Peru ==
IRTP

- Radio Nacional del Perú

== Philippines ==
PBS - Philippine Broadcasting Service

- DZRB Radyo Pilipinas 1 738 kHz Manila - news, talk, current affairs, information, music, entertainment
- DWFO Republika FM1 87.5 Manila
- DWFT Capital FM2 104.3 MHz Manila
- DZRM Radyo Magasin 1278 kHz
- DZSR Radyo Pilipinas Dos 918 kHz
- FM1 Davao 87.9 MHz

== Poland ==
Polskie Radio

- Program 1 Jedynka - information and adult contemporary music
- Program 2 Dwójka - classical music and cultural
- Program 3 Trójka - rock, alternative, jazz, and eclectic
- Polskie Radio 24 (PR24) – news
- Digital
  - Program 4 (Czwórka – Four) – youth oriented
  - Polskie Radio Chopin – Polish classical music
  - Polskie Radio Dzieciom – children programming (daytime), parents magazines (evenings) and Jazz music (nights)
  - Polskie Radio Rytm – pop music
  - Polskie Radio dlya Ukraini - Ukrainske Radio (DAB)
- Regional stations
  - Radio Białystok (Includes Belorussian, Ukrainian, Lithuanian, Russian programs)
  - Radio Pomorza i Kujaw (Bydgoszcz)
  - Radio Gdańsk (includes Kasubian language programs)
  - Radio Katowice (includes German programs)
  - Radio Kielce
  - Radio Koszalin
  - Radio Kraków
  - Radio Lublin
  - Radio Łódź
  - Radio Olsztyn (includes German programs)
  - Radio Opole (includes German programs)
  - Radio Poznań
  - Polskie Radio Rzeszów
  - Radio Szczecin
  - Polskie Radio RDC (Warszawa)
  - Radio Wrocław (includes German programs)
  - Radio Zachód
- City stations
  - Gorzów Wielkopolski – Radio Gorzów
  - Lublin – Radio Freee
  - Poznań – MC Radio
  - Słupsk – Radio Słupsk
  - Szczecin – Radio Szczecin Extra
  - Wrocław – Radio RAM
  - Zielona Góra – Radio Zielona Góra
  - Łódź – Radio Łódź Nad Wartą
- The radio's website includes news in English, Russian, Ukrainian, Belorussian, German

== Portugal ==
RTP - Rádio e Televisão de Portugal

- Antena 1 - news, talk
- Antena 2 - classical music, culture
- Antena 3 - pop, youth
- África
- Acores (Antena1)
- Madeira (Antena1, Antena3)
- Digital: Zigzag - children

== Puerto Rico ==
Puerto Rico Public Broadcasting Corporation

- WIPR (AM) - News, talk
- WIPR-FM

WRTU

== Qatar ==
QMC - Qatar General Broadcasting and Television Corporation

- Qatar Radio
- QBS FM
- Holy Quran Radio
- Oryx FM French
- Urdu Radio

== Réunion ==
France Télévisions

- Réunion La Première

== Romania ==
Radio România

- Actualități
- Cultural
- Muzical
- Regional studios
  - Radio Brașov FM
  - Radio București FM
    - Bukaresti Rádió Románia (nationwide AM network only, in Hungarian)
    - Radio Rumänien, Bukarest (nationwide AM network only, in German)
  - Radio Cluj
    - Radio România Cluj
    - Kolozsvári Rádió Románia (in Hungarian)
  - Radio Constanța (includes programs in Greek, Turkish, Tatar, Armenian, Aroman dialect)
  - Radio Iași
  - Radio Oltenia Craiova
  - Radio Târgu Mureș
    - Radio Târgu Mureș
    - Marosvásárhelyi Rádió Románia (in Hungarian)
    - Radio Rumänien Neumarkt (in German)
  - Radio Reșița (Banat) (includes weekly programs in Croatian, Slovak, Czech, and others)
  - Radio Timișoara
    - Radio Timișoara (includes programs in Hungarian (Temesvári Rádió), German and Serbian)
  - Radio Vacanța
- Antena Satelor - rural
- Digital: E-teatru radio drama

== Russia ==
VGRTK - Всероссийская государственная телевизионная и радиовещательная компания

- Radio Rossii/Радио России - Talk, news
  - Separate programs for 5 time zone regions ('dubl's) +0, +2, +4, +6, +8hr compared to Moscow, in all regional GRTK centers
  - Dubl-M (MSK+0) — European Russia, 54 federal subjects + Kaliningrad
    - Central Federal District
      - GTRK Belgorod (Belgorod)
      - GTRK Bryansk (Bryansk)
      - GTRK Ivtelradio (Ivanovo)
      - GTRK Kaluga (Kaluga)
      - GTRK Kostroma (Kostroma)
      - GTRK Kursk (Kursk)
      - GTRK Lipetsk (Lipetsk)
      - GTRK Oka (Ryazan)
      - GTRK Oryol (Oryol)
      - GTRK Smolensk (Smolensk)
      - GTRK Tambov (Tambov)
      - GTRK Tula (Tula)
      - GTRK Tver (Tver)
      - GTRK Vladimir (Vladimir)
      - GTRK Voronezh (Voronezh)
      - GTRK Yaroslavia (Yaroslavl)
    - Northwestern Federal District
      - GTRK Kaliningrad (Kaliningrad)
      - GTRK Karelia (Petrozavodsk) (Russian, Karelian, Finnish, Veps languages)
      - GTRK Komi Gor (Syktyvkar)
      - GTRK Murman (Murmansk)
      - GTRK Pomorie (Arkhangelsk)
      - GTRK Zapolyarye / branch (Naryan-Mar)
      - GTRK Pskov (Pskov)
      - GTRK Saint Petersburg (Saint Petersburg)
      - GTRK Slavia (Veliky Novgorod)
      - GTRK Vologda (Vologda)
    - Southern Federal District
      - GTRK Adygea (Maykop)
      - GTRK Don-TR (Rostov-on-Don)
      - GTRK Kalmykia (Elista)
      - GTRK Kuban (Krasnodar)
      - GTRK Kuban / branch (Sochi)
      - GTRK Lotos (Astrakhan)
      - GTRK Volgograd-TRV (Volgograd)
    - North Caucasian Federal District
      - GTRK Alania (Vladikavkaz)
      - GTRK Dagestan (Makhachkala) (in Avar, Dargin, Lak, Kumyk, and Lezgin languages)
      - GTRK Ingushetia (Nazran)
      - GTRK Kabardino-Balkaria (Nalchik) (Russian and Kabardian language)
      - GTRK Karachay-Cherkessia (Cherkessk)
      - GTRK Stavropol (Stavropol)
      - GTRK Vainakh (Grozny)
    - Volga Federal District
      - GTRK Bashkortostan (Ufa)
      - GTRK Chuvashia (Cheboksary)
      - GTRK Mari El (Yoshkar-Ola) (Russian and Mari languages)
      - GTRK Mordovia (Saransk) (Russian, Mordvin (Moksha and erzyan) and tatar languages)
      - GTRK Nizhny Novgorod (Nizhny Novgorod)
      - GTRK Orenburg (Orenburg)
      - GTRK Penza (Penza)
      - GTRK Perm (Perm)
      - GTRK Saratov (Saratov)
      - GTRK Tatarstan (Kazan)
      - GTRK Vyatka (Kirov)
  - Dubl-4 (MSK+1–MSK+2) — Urals and part of Western Siberia
    - Volga Federal District (MSK+1)
      - GTRK Samara (Samara)
      - GTRK Udmurtia (Izhevsk)
      - GTRK Volga (Ulyanovsk)
    - Ural Federal District (MSK+2)
      - GTRK Kurgan (Kurgan)
      - GTRK South Ural (Chelyabinsk)
      - GTRK Tyumen-Region (Tyumen)
      - GTRK Ural (Yekaterinburg)
      - GTRK Yamal (Salekhard)
      - GTRK Yugoria (Khanty-Mansiysk)
  - Dubl-3 (MSK+3–MSK+5) — Central and Western Siberia
    - MSK+3
      - GTRK Irtysh (Omsk)
    - MSK+4
      - GTRK Altai (Barnaul)
      - GTRK Gorny Altai (Gorno-Altaysk)
      - GTRK Khakassia (Abakan)
      - GTRK Krasnoyarsk (Krasnoyarsk)
      - GTRK Taymyr / branch (Dudinka)
      - GTRK Kuzbass (Kemerovo)
      - GTRK Novosibirsk (Novosibirsk)
      - GTRK Tomsk (Tomsk)
      - GTRK Tuva (Kyzyl)
    - MSK+5
      - GTRK Irkutsk (Irkutsk)
      - GTRK Ust-Orda / branch (Ust-Orda)
      - GTRK Buryatia (Ulan-Ude)
  - Dubl-2 (MSK+6–MSK+7) — Eastern Siberia and Far East
    - MSK+6
      - GTRK Sakha (Yakutsk)
      - GTRK Chita (Chita)
      - GTRK Aginskoye / branch (Aginskoye)
    - MSK+7
      - GTRK Amur (Blagoveshchensk)
      - GTRK Bira (Birobidzhan)
      - GTRK Far East (Khabarovsk)
      - GTRK Vladivostok (Vladivostok)
  - Dubl-1 (MSK+8–MSK+9) — Kamchatka, Chukotka, Magadan, Sakhalin
    - MSK+8
      - GTRK Magadan (Magadan)
      - GTRK Sakhalin (Yuzhno-Sakhalinsk)
    - MSK+9
      - GTRK Kamchatka (Petropavlovsk-Kamchatsky)
      - GTRK Chukotka (Anadyr)
- Radio Mayak/Маяк - Music, talk, youth program, with regional windows in some regional GRTK centers
- Vesti FM/Вести FM - All news, with regional windows in some regional GRTK centers
- Radio Kultura/Радио Культура - Culture (Moscow only)
- Radio Yunost/Радио Юность (ЮFM) - Youth (online)
- Regional radio stations other than local versions of the federal channels:
  - Moscow
    - Moscow FM (Moscow gov't)
    - Capital FM (Moscow gov't) (in English)
    - Radio Moscow (Moscow gov't)
  - Barnaul and Altai
    - Heart FM
  - Volgograd
    - Volgograd 24 FM
  - GTRK Дальневосточная
    - Радио Хорошего Настроения (Khabarovsk)
  - North Ossetia
    - Алания ФМ
  - GTRK Alaniya
    - Алания FM

The Russian State TV and Radio Music Centre - Российский государственный музыкальный телерадиоцентр

- Radio Orfey - Classical music

== Rwanda ==
RBA - Rwanda Broadcasting Agency

- Radio Rwanda Fm100.7 - Kinyarwanda, French, English, Kiswahili
- Regional stations:
  - Magic FM Kigali
  - Radio Rubavu
  - Radio Nyagatare
  - Radio Inteko
  - Radio Huye
  - Radio Musanze
  - Radio Rusizi

== Saint Barthélemy ==
France Télévisions

- Guadeloupe La Première

Radio St. Barth

== Saint Helena ==
SAMS - South Atlantic Media Services

- SAMS Radio 1

== Saint Kitts & Nevis ==
ZIZ - National Broadcasting Corporation of St. Kitts & Nevis

== Saint Lucia ==
Radio St. Lucia (closed)

== Saint Martin ==
France Télévisions

- Guadeloupe La Première

Radio Saint Martin 101.5 Fm

== Saint Pierre & Miquelon ==
France Télévisions

- Saint-Pierre-et-Miquelon La Première

== Samoa ==
SBC - Samoa Broadcasting Corporation

- SBC Radio 1 - Samoan
- SBC-FM, 88.1FM - English

== San Marino ==
San Marino RTV

- Radio San Marino
- Radio San Marino Classic

== São Tomé and Príncipe ==
Radio Nacional São Tomé

== Saudi Arabia ==
SBA - Saudi Broadcasting Authority

- Riyadh Radio - General
- Jeddah Radio - General 2nd
- Saudia Radio
- International Radio
- Quran Radio
- Neda Radio (Call of Islam Mecca)
- Virgin Radio Saudi Arabia
- RadioSunna

== Scotland ==
BBC Scotland

- BBC Radio Scotland
- BBC Radio nan Gàidheal

== Senegal ==
RTS - Radiodiffusion Télévision Sénégalaise

- Chaîne nationale
- Radio Sénégal Internationale (RSI)
- Dakar FM
- Regional stations
  - Djourbel FM
  - Fatick FM
  - Kaolack FM
  - Kolda FM
  - Louga FM
  - Matam FM
  - Saint Louis FM
  - Tamba FM
  - Touba FM
  - Thiès FM
  - Ziguinchor FM

== Serbia ==
RTS - Radio televizija Srbije—Radio Belgrade

- Radio Beograd 1 - news talk
- Radio Beograd 2 - arts, culture, jazz
- Radio Beograd 3 - classical music, radio drama
- Beograd 202 - pop

=== Autonomous Province of Vojvodina ===
Радио Телевизија Војводине - Radio Televizija Vojvodine

- Novi Sad 1 - Serbian
- Vajdasági rádió és televízió - Novi Sad 2 - Hungarian
- Novi Sad 3 - (In Croatian, Slovak, Rusyn, Romanian, Romany, Ukrainian, Bunjevac dialect, Croatian, Macedonian, Bulgarian, German, Albanian, Czech, Russian, Montenegrin)
- ORadio (Omladinski radio) - online

== Seychelles ==
SBC - Seychelles Broadcasting Corporation

== Sierra Leone ==
Sierra Leone Broadcasting Corporation

== Singapore ==
Mediacorp

- Ria 89.7FM - Malay - Top 40 (CHR)
- Gold 905 - English - Classic hits
- Symphony 924 - English - Classical
- YES 933 - Chinese Top 40 (CHR)
- CNA938 - English - Talk radio
- Warna 94.2FM - Malay - News, infotainment
- Class 95 - English - Adult contemporary
- Capital 95.8FM - Chinese - Talk radio
- Oli 96.8FM - Tamil - Infotainment
- Love 97.2FM - Chinese - Easy listening
- 987FM English - Top 40 (CHR)

== Sint Maarten ==
NPO - Nederlandse Publieke Omroep

== Slovakia ==
STVR - Slovenská televízia a rozhlas

- Rádio Slovensko - Talk news
- Rádio Devín- Classical, jazz
- Rádio FM- rock
- Pátria Rádió - Hungarian Full service
- Regional
  - Rádio Regina západ - Bratislava (West)
  - Rádio Regina stred - Banská Bystrica (Central)
  - Rádio Regina východ - Košice (East) (includes programs of Radio Patria NEV in Rusyn/Ukrainian, Romani, Czech, Polish language)
- Junior - online - children

== Slovenia ==
RTV Slovenija

- Prvi - news talk (includes romani program)
- Ars
- Val 202
- Radio Si (German/English multilingual)
- Radio Koper
- Radio Maribor
- Radio Capodistria (in Italian)
- MMR Muravidéki Magyar Rádió (in Hungarian)

== Solomon Islands ==
- SIBC - Solomon Islands Broadcasting Corporation

== Somalia ==
- State Radio Muqdisho

Somali Broadcasting Corporation

- Boosaaso FM
- Garowe Studio FM
- Gardo Studio FM
- Burao Studio FM

Somali National Army Radio

SNA Radio 90.7

=== Somaliland ===
- Radio Hargeysa

== South Africa ==
SABC - South African Broadcasting Corporation

- Radio2000 - English
- 5FM - English
- Metro FM - English
- SaFM - English
- Good Hope FM - English/Afrikaans
- Tru FM - English/Xhosa
- RSG - Afrikaans
- Ukhozi FM - Zulu
- 8 regional languages
- Lotus FM - English/Hindi

== South Korea ==
KBS - Korean Broadcasting System

- KBS Radio 1 - News, talk, drama
- KBS Radio 2 - Pop
- KBS Radio 3 - For disabled
- KBS 1FM - Classical, folk
- KBS 2FM - Pop
- KBS Hanminjok Radio - Ethnic

== South Sudan ==
United Nations

- Miraya

== Spain ==
RNE - Radio Nacional de España

- Radio Nacional - Talk
- Radio Clásica - Classical
- Radio 3 - Youth
- Radio 4 - Catalan Regional, in Catalan
- Radio 5 - All news

Autonomous communities

- Andalusia
  - Canal Sur Radio y Television (Sevilla)
    - Canal Sur Radio
    - Radio Andalucía Información
    - Canal Fiesta Radio
- Aragon
  - CARTV Corporación Aragonesa de Radio y Televisión (Zaragoza)
    - Aragón Radio (Includes Aragonese and Catalan programs)
- Asturias
  - RTPA RPA Radiotelevisión del Principado de Asturias (includes Asturian programs) (Gijón / Xixón)
- Balearic Islands
  - Ens Públic de Radiotelevisió de les Illes Balears (Calvià)
    - IB3 Ràdio (Catalan language)
- Canary Islands
  - RTVC Radio Televisión Canaria (Santa Cruz de Tenerife)
    - Canarias Radio
- Cantabria (none)
- Castilla-La Mancha
  - CMM Radio (Toledo)
- Castile and León (none)
- Catalonia
  - Corporació Catalana de Mitjans Audiovisuals (Sant Joan Despí)
    - Catalunya Radio (Catalan, Aranese)
    - 3CatInfo ràdio
    - Catalunya Música
    - iCat
- Valencian Community
  - Corporació Valenciana de Mitjans de Comunicació (Burjassot)
    - À Punt FM (Valencian, Catalan)
- Extremadura
  - Canal Extremadura Radio (Mérida)
- Galicia
  - Corporación de Servizos Audiovisuais de Galicia S.A. (CSAG) (Galician) (Santiago de Compostela)
    - Radio Galega
    - Radio Galega Música
    - Son Galicia Radio
- La Rioja (none)
- Madrid
  - RTVM - Radio Televisión Madrid (Telemadrid) (Pozuelo de Alarcón/Madrid)
    - Onda Madrid
- Region of Murcia
  - ORM Onda Regional de Murcia (Murcia)
- Navarre (none)
- Basque Country
  - EITB Radio Televisión Pública Vasca (Bilbao / Bilbo)
    - Euskadi Irratia (Basque)
    - Radio Euskadi (Spanish)
    - Radio Vitoria (Vitoria-Gasteiz / Gasteiz)
    - Gaztea
    - EITB Musika
    - Euskal Kantak

== Sri Lanka ==
SLBC - Sri Lanka Broadcasting Corporation

- Radio Sri Lanka - Sinhalese
- Sinhala National Service - Sinhalese
- City FM
- Valanda Seva Sinhala - Commercial Service - Sinhalese
- Thendral - Tamil - commercial
- Tamil National Service - Tamil
- Kandurata FM - Local
- Asia Service
- Rajata

== Sudan ==
SRTC

== Suriname ==
- Radio SRS Suriname - commercial

== Sweden ==
SR - Sveriges Radio

- P1 - intelligent speech
- P2 - art music, jazz, folk
- P3 - youth channel
- P4 Stockholm and ca 30 other regions, local, adult mix
- P6 Stockholm - minority and foreign languages (Arabic, English, Meänkieli, Romani, Jiddish, Sami, Finnish)
- Sveriges Radio Finska - Finnish and Meänkieli (DAB)
- SR Sápmi - Sami (online)
- EKOT - all-news (online)
- Radioapans knattekanal - children's (DAB)

== Switzerland ==
=== German ===
SRF - Schweizer Radio und Fernsehen

- SRF 1
- SRF 2 Kultur
- SRF 3
- SRF4 News
- SRF Musikwelle
- SRF Virus

=== French ===
RTS - Radio Télévision Suisse

- La 1ére
- Espace2
- Couleur3
- Option Musique

=== Italian ===
RSI - Radiotelevisione Svizzera

- Rete Uno
- Rete Due
- Rete Tre

=== Romansh ===
RTR - Radiotelevisiun Svizra Rumantscha

- Radio Rumantsch

== Syria ==
ORTAS - General Organization of Radio and TV Syria

- Radio Dimshq
- Voice of youth
- Suryana

== Taiwan ==
FHBS - Fuxing Broadcasting Station

- FHBS Radio 1

Ministry of Defense

- Voice of Han

NER - National Education Radio (國立教育廣播電臺)

PRS - Police Radio Station (警察廣播電台)

TBS - Taipei Broadcasting Station (台北廣播電台)

KBS - Kaohsiung Broadcasting Station (高雄廣播電台)

== Tajikistan ==
TeleRadioCom

- Radio Tojik
- Radio Farhang
- Ovozi Tojik
- Sadoi Dushanbe

== Tanzania ==
TBC - Tanzania Broadcasting Corporation

- TBC FM
- TBC Taifa

== Thailand ==
MCOT

- MCOT Radio
- Labour's Radio
- Lukthung Mahanakhon
- Khluen Khwam Khit 96.50 MHz
- Seed FM 97.50 MHz - Thai, English
- Active FM 99.00 MHz
- News Network 100.50 MHz
- Met 107 - English
- Eazy FM - Thai, English

Radio Thailand

- AM 819 kHz
- AM 891 kHz
- Educational Radio and Emergency Alerts AM 1467 kHz
- FM 88.0 MHz
- FM 92.5 MHz
- FM 93.5 MHz
- FM 95.5 MHz
- FM 97.0 MHz
- FM 105.0 MHz
- World Service

== Togo ==
Radio Lomé

- Radio Lomé

== Tokelau ==
Radio Tokelau

RNZ - Radio New Zealand

== Tonga ==
TBC Tonga Broadcasting Commission

- Radio Tonga

== Trinidad and Tobago ==
Caribbean New Media Group

- Talk City 91.1

== Tunisia ==
Radio Tunisienne

- Radio Nationale
- Radio Culture
- Radio Jeunes
- Radio Tunis Chanine Internationale
- 5 local stations

== Turkey ==
TRT - Turkish Radio and Television Corporation/Türkiye Radyo Televizyon Kurumu

- Radyo 1 - Talk
- TRT FM - Turkish pop
- Radyo 3 - Jazz, classical
- Radyo Nağme - Turkish art music
- Radyo Türkü - Turkish Folk music
- Radio haber - news
- Kurdi Radyo - Kurdish language (Ankara)
- Regional (Bölge Radyosu)
  - Antalya Radyosu (Antalya)
  - Çukurova Radyosu (Mersin)
  - Erzurum Radyosu (Erzurum)
  - GAP Diyarbakır Radyosu (Diyarbakır)
  - Trabzon Radyosu (Trabzon)

== Turkmenistan ==
TR / Türkmentelekom

- TR1 Watan
- TR2 Çar Tarapdan
- TR3 Miras
- TR4 Owaz

== Turks and Caicos ==
RTC

- Radio Turks and Caicos RTC

== Tuvalu ==
Tuvalu Media Corporation (web)

- Radio Tuvalu

== U.S. Virgin Islands ==
PBS

- WTJX-FM

== Uganda ==
UBC - Uganda Broadcasting Corporation

- UBC Radio Uganda
- Red Channel
- Blue Channel
- Star FM
- Magic 100
- Mega FM

== Ukraine ==
НСТУ - Національна суспільна телерадіокомпанія України (Суспільне/Suspilne) - National Public Broadcasting Company of Ukraine

- UR-1 Ukrainian Radio Українське радіо
- UR-2 Promin Радіо Промінь (ray) - music
- UR-3 Kultúra Радіо Культура - culture
- Regional stations
  - Tisa FM (Uzhhorod, Zakarpattia)
  - Lvivska Khvylia (Lviv)
  - Hutsulske Radio (Ivano-Frankivsk)
  - Suspіlne Chernivtsi – includes programs in Romanian
  - Suspіlne Odesa – includes programs in Romanian and Bulgarian
  - Suspіlne Kharkiv
  - Suspіlne Dnipro
  - Suspіlne Zaporizhzhia
  - Suspіlne Mykolaiv
  - Suspіlne Vinnytsia
  - Suspіlne Rivne
  - Suspіlne Ternopil
  - Suspіlne Lutsk
  - Suspіlne Sumy
  - Suspіlne Poltava
  - Suspіlne Chernihiv
  - Suspіlne Zhytomyr
  - Suspіlne Cherkasy
  - Suspіlne Kropyvnytskyi
  - Suspіlne Donbas
  - Suspilne Krym (Also in Krym-Tatar language) (TV/web only?)
- Russian State channels broadcasting in the Russian-occupied parts of Ukraine
  - GTRK Lugansk (ГТРК ЛНР) (Lugansk) (occupied Ukrainian territory)
    - Radio Vremja
    - Radio Pobeda
    - Radio Respublika
    - Svoya Volna
    - Rokot FM
  - GTRK Sevastopol / branch (Sevastopol) (Radio Rossiya, Radio Mayak, Vesti FM)

== United Arab Emirates ==
Abu Dhabi Media

- Abu Dhabi FM
- Abu Dhabi Classic FM - western Classical, Jazz and Chill Out
- Emarat FM - entertainment
- Quran Kareem Radio
- Radio Mirchi - Indian station's local version
- Star FM - youth music
- Radio 1 - top 40
- Radio 2 - feel good music

Dubai Media Incorporated

- Noor Dubai
- Dubai Radio

== United Kingdom ==
BBC - British Broadcasting Corporation

- BBC Radio 1 - CHR
- BBC Radio 1Xtra - Electronica, hip hop, R&B, soul
- BBC Radio 2 - AC/AOR entertainment
- BBC Radio 3 - Classical music, jazz, drama, arts
- BBC Radio 4 - News, talk, and drama
- BBC Radio 4 Extra - Comedy, Drama, Entertainment
- BBC Radio 5 Live - Live News and sport
- BBC Radio 5 Sports Extra - Sport
- BBC Radio 6 Music - Alternative/Indie music
- BBC Asian Network - British Asian Music, News & Entertainment
- BBC World Service
- Regional services
  - Scotland
    - BBC Radio Scotland
    - BBC Radio Nan Gàidheal (Scottish Gaelic language)
  - Wales
    - BBC Radio Wales
    - BBC Radio Cymru (Welsh (cymraeg) language)
    - BBC Radio Cymru 2 (Welsh (cymraeg) language)
  - BBC Radio Shetland
  - BBC Radio Orkney
  - Northern Ireland
    - BBC Radio Ulster (includes Irish and Ulster scots programs)
    - BBC Radio Foyle (includes Irish and Ulster scots programs)
- Local services (in English Regions)
  - BBC Essex
  - BBC Radio Cambridgeshire
  - BBC Radio Norfolk
  - BBC Radio Northampton
  - BBC Radio Suffolk
  - BBC Three Counties Radio
  - BBC Radio Derby
  - BBC Radio Leicester
  - BBC Radio Nottingham
  - BBC Radio London
  - BBC Radio Newcastle
  - BBC Radio Cumbria
  - BBC Radio Tees
  - BBC Radio Lancashire
  - BBC Radio Manchester
  - BBC Radio Merseyside
  - BBC Radio Berkshire
  - BBC Radio Oxford
  - BBC Radio Solent
  - BBC Radio Kent
  - BBC Radio Surrey
  - BBC Radio Sussex
  - BBC Radio Cornwall (includes Cornish language programs)
  - BBC Radio Devon
  - BBC Radio Bristol
  - BBC Radio Gloucestershire
  - BBC Radio Somerset
  - BBC Radio Wiltshire
  - BBC Radio WM
  - BBC CWR (was BBC Coventry & Warwickshire)
  - BBC Hereford & Worcester
  - BBC Radio Shropshire
  - BBC Radio Stoke
  - BBC Radio Leeds
  - BBC Radio Sheffield
  - BBC Radio York
  - BBC Radio Humberside
  - BBC Radio Lincolnshire

=== Gibraltar ===
GBC Gibraltar Broadcasting Corporation

- Radio Gibraltar (English, Spanish programs)

=== Jersey ===
Autonomous and self-governing British Crown Dependency

- BBC Radio Jersey

=== Guernsey ===
Autonomous and self-governing British Crown Dependency

- BBC Radio Guernsey

== United States ==
The USA government maintains two groups of stations for external broadcasting (Voice of America and Radio Liberty and its sister stations) plus the American Forces Network.

National Cable Satellite Corporation

- WCSP-FM / C-SPAN radio - proceedings of the United States federal government, and public affairs

NPR - National Public Radio (nonprofit, NGO)

- NPR programs are relayed by state or local public broadcasters. All member stations are listed here.

PRI - Public Radio International (nonprofit, NGO)

- PRI programs are relayed by state or local public broadcasters

Public broadcasters

The outputs of these broadcasters are aired in several local stations. Some broadcasters form a group of FM and/or HD stations, consisting of talk/news and jazz/classical stations.

- Arkansas Public Media
- California
  - KQED North and Central California
  - California Southern California Public Radio
  - Capital Public Radio
  - Valley Public Radio
  - California Local Public Radio - KALW
- Colorado Public radio
- Connecticut Public radio
- Delaware Public Media - WDDE
- Florida
  - Florida Public Radio Network
  - Florida Public Media
- Georgia Public Broadcasting
- Hawai'i Public radio
- Idaho
  - Boise State Public Radio
- Illinois
  - NPR Illinois
  - Public Media WILL
  - Northern Public Radio WNIJ
  - Illinois Public Radio - WSIU
  - Chicago's NPR WBEZ
- Indiana Public Radio - WBST
- Indianapolis Public Radio - WFYI
- Indiana Public Media - WFIU
- Iowa Public radio
- Kansas Public radio
- Kentucky Public radio
- Louisiana
  - WWNO - New Orleans Public Radio
  - Red River Radio
  - Louisiana Public Broadcasting
- Maine Public
- Maryland Public radio stations
- Massachusetts
  - GBH
  - New England Public Radio
  - WBUR
- Michigan Radio
- Minnesota Public radio
- Mississippi Public Broadcasting
- Missouri: St Louis Public Radio
- Montana Public radio
- Nebraska: KUCV
- Nevada Public radio - KNPR
- New Hampshire Public radio
- New Jersey Public radio - NJPR
- New Mexico
  - New Mexico Public radio - KANW
  - KRWG Public media for southwestern New Mexico and Far West Texas
  - KENW Public radio for Eastern New Mexico and West Texas
- New York Public radio - WNYC
- North Carolina Public radio - WUNC
- North Carolina: Blue Ridge Public Radio (western North Carolina)
- Prairie Public Radio (North Dakota)
- Ohio
  - WKSU Northeast Ohio
  - WOSU Regional Radio Network
  - Ohio Public radio - WCBE
- Oklahoma: KOSU
- Oregon Public Broadcasting
- Pennsylvania: WPSU Penn State (central Pennsylvania)
- Rhode Island: RIPR - The Public's Radio
- South Carolina Public radio
- South Dakota Public Broadcasting
- Tennessee: Nashville Public Radio - WPLN
- Texas Public radio - KSTX
- Utah Public radio
- Vermont Public radio
- Virginia: WMRA Public Radio of the Shenandoah Valley
- Washington: Northwest Public Broadcasting
- West Virginia Public radio
- Wisconsin Public radio
- Wyoming Public Media
- Washington DC: WAMU - American University Radio

== Uruguay ==
Radiodifusión Nacional del Uruguay

- Clásica 650 AM
- Radio Uruguay
- Emisora del Sur
- Babel FM

== Uzbekistan ==
MTRK - O'zbekiston Milly Teleradioompaniyasi

- O'zbekiston
- Toshkent
- Mahalla - Society
- Yoshlar - Youth

== Vanuatu ==
VBTC - Vanuatu Broadcasting & Television Corporation

- Radio Vanuatu
- Paradise FM
- Femme pawa FM

== Venezuela ==
RNV - Radio Nacional de Venezuela

- Canal Informativo
- Juvenil (Activa)
- Canal Clasico
- Canal Musical
- Canal Indigena
- 5 Radio Local

== Vietnam ==
VoV - Voice of Vietnam

- VOV1 - News
- VOV2 - Culture
- VOV3 - Music
- VOV4 - Ethnic

== Wallis & Futuna ==
France Télévisions

- Wallis-et-Futuna La Première

== Western Sahara ==
SNRT Société Nationale de Radiodiffusion et de Télévision

- Al Idaâ Al-Watania
- Al Idaâ Al Amazighia
- Quran
- Chaîne Inter

Radio national de LA R.A.S.D (الإذاعة الوطنية للجمهورية العربية الصحراوية)

== Yemen ==
Yemen General Corporation for Radio & TV

- Sana'a Radio
- Aden Radio

== Zambia ==
ZNBC - Zambia National Broadcasting Corporation

- Radio 1 - Bemba, tonga, nyanja, lozi, kaonder, luvale
- Radio 2 - English
- Radio 4 - Music

== Zimbabwe ==
ZBC - Zimbabwe Broadcasting Corporation

- Classic 263 - English talk & old school
- Radio Zimbabwe - Ndebele & Shona
- Power FM - youth music
- National FM - 14 local languages
- Khulumani FM - Matabeleland region
- 95.8 Central Radio - Midlands region
