= 1584 AM =

AM radio frequency

Copies of the World Radio TV Handbook (including the 1991 edition) have identified 1584 kHz as a local frequency, akin to the Class C (former Class IV) radio stations in North America which are limited to 1kW.

The following radio stations broadcast on AM frequency 1584 kHz:

== Australia ==
- 4CC in Rockhampton, Queensland
- 5WM in Woomera, South Australia (ABC North/West)
- 7SH in St Helens, Tasmania (ABC National)
- 2WA in Wilcannia, New South Wales (ABC Broken Hill)

== Italy ==
- Free Radio AM - Radio Diffusione Europea

== Hong Kong ==
- RTHK Radio 3

== Japan ==
- JOQG in Hukaura
- JOBG in Shimabara (both NHK-1)

== Korea ==
- HLDK in Danyang
- HLQZ in Geumsan (both KBS-1)

== Palau ==
- T8AA in Koror

== The Philippines ==
- DWBR-AM in Talavera
