= T8AA =

T8AA may refer to:

- T8AA (AM), a radio station (1584 kHz) licensed to Koror, Palau
- T8AA-FM, a radio station (87.9 MHz) licensed to Koror, Palau
