= 94.6 FM =

FM radio frequency

The following radio stations broadcast on FM frequency 94.6 MHz:

== China ==
- Beijing Music Radio in Beijing (cabel FM)
- CNR The Voice of China in Luoyang
- Radio Foshan in Foshan

== Indonesia ==
- Style Radio in Tasikmalaya RDS: "STYLE946FM"
- Radio Kotaperak in Yogyakarta

== Malaysia ==
- Lite in Johor Bahru, Johor and Singapore

== New Zealand ==
- Coast in Wanaka

== Nigeria ==
- Brc 2 FM in Bauchi

== United Kingdom ==
- Cabin FM in Herne Bay
- BBC Radio Stoke in Stoke-On-Trent
