= Erio =

Erio or ERIO may refer to:

- European Roma Information Office (ERIO), an international advocacy organization for Romani people
- Erio Tosatti, an Italian theoretical physicist
- Erio Tōwa, a fictional character from Ground Control to Psychoelectric Girl
- Erio Mondial, a fictional character from Magical Girl Lyrical Nanoha
