= Outremont High School =

School in Montreal, Quebec, Canada

Coordinates: 45°30′59″N 73°36′37″W

Outremont High School was a high school in the Montreal suburb of Outremont, operated by the Protestant School Board of Greater Montreal. The school was located at 500 Boulevard Dollard and opened in 1955. The building is now an adult education centre.

== Alumni ==
- Irwin Cotler, law professor and Member of Parliament
- Lawrence Bergman, member of the National Assembly of Quebec and philanthropist
- Elias Koteas, actor
- Millicent Redway, businessperson and multicultural marketing pioneer
- Frank Furedi, Sociologist, commentator, emeritus professor of sociology at the University of Kent, and author of 25 books
