= 531 AM =

AM radio frequency

The following radio stations broadcast on AM frequency 531 kHz:

== Algeria ==
- Radio Algérie Internationale

== Botswana ==
- Radio Botswana

== Faroe Islands ==
- Kringvarp Føroya

== Iran ==
- IRIB Radio Qazvin

== Romania ==
- SRR Antena Satelor
- SRR Radio România Actualitǎți

== Saudi Arabia ==
- SBA Quran Radio
