= Millicent Redway =

Jamaican-Canadian publisher

Millicent Redway is a Jamaican-Canadian businessperson and publisher with a passion for Black economic development. She is best known as publisher of Black Pages directory and for her pioneering efforts in the multicultural marketing industry in Canada.

Born in Kingston, Jamaica to Alva George Redway and Eunice Afflick, Redway at age 11, together with a younger brother and sister moved to Montreal, Quebec, Canada to join their mother who had migrated a year earlier. At an early age, Redway became very active in community-building activities in Montreal's Black community playing leading roles in a variety of key socio-economic organizations like the NDG Black Community Centre, the Cote des Neiges Project, Black Community Council of Quebec and Montreal Association of Black Business Persons and Professionals.

After graduating from Outremont High School, Redway attended Concordia University where she received a BComm. degree with a major in Marketing and a minor in Management. Unhappy about being passed over several times for a promotion at a leading office equipment and supplies company, Redway secured commitments from a number of key accounts, established Communication Mink in 1986 and competed successfully against her former employer.

In 1987 she met and married Lynrod Douglas, a Trinidadian-American then living in New York. The couple had met through a mutual friend while in Toronto for the Caribana festival and married after a four-month courtship. In 1989 the couple founded Black Pages Network to publish a Yellow Pages type directory of Black-owned businesses and organizations out of a need to provide a vehicle for recycling dollars in the Black and Caribbean community. Redway served in the capacity of president. Focused on Black economic empowerment themes such as "Recycling dollars in the community" and "Diversity means business", the project generated considerable publicity in the local and national media and the company would go on to play a key role in the promotion, development and support of the Black business community and would play a pioneering role in leading the ethnic directory trend in Canada. Black Pages may not have been the first ethnic directory in Canada, but following its success, ethnic directories began popping up in cultural communities across the country.

She helped organize Black Business Week and the Canadian Black Community Showcase in 1992, and was listed in the premier edition of Who's Who in Ontario. In 1993, the Municipality of Metropolitan Toronto officially proclaimed October 1–8 Black Business Week in support of the work the company was doing with Black businesses.

Under Redway's leadership, Black Pages Network undertook the first known survey of Black businesses in Canada to identify issues faced by Black business owners. Conducted in conjunction with Dr. Frances Henry of York University, the study was published under the title "A Survey of Black Businesses in Metro Toronto" in 1992. Among the main findings of the survey was that the business participation rate among the Black population was less than one-third that of the general population in Toronto; and that racism was a barrier to business success. To counter this trend Black Pages initiated "Minority Youth in Business Day", an annual event which encouraged Black youth to consider self-employment as a viable career option. Ten years later, a second collaboration, this time with social geographer, Dr. Carlos Teixeira of the University of Toronto, undertook the study, "Black Entrepreneurs in The Toronto Census Metropolitan Area" (2002). The major findings of this study echoed findings of the first survey when it showed that Blacks experienced unique challenges when establishing their businesses with access to capital being the most crucial limiting factor.

== Jump Promotions International ==
Black Pages was sold in 2003 after which Redway and Douglas established Jump Promotions International, a company specializing in three main areas: Publishing, Events Planning and Small Business Consulting.
