= 693 AM =

AM radio frequency

The following radio stations broadcast on AM frequency 693 kHz:

== Algeria ==
- Radio Adrar from Reggane

== Botswana ==
- Radio Botswana from Shakawe

== Japan ==
- JOAB from Tokyo

== United Kingdom ==
- BBC Radio 5 Live
