= Lívia Járóka =

Hungarian politician (born 1974)

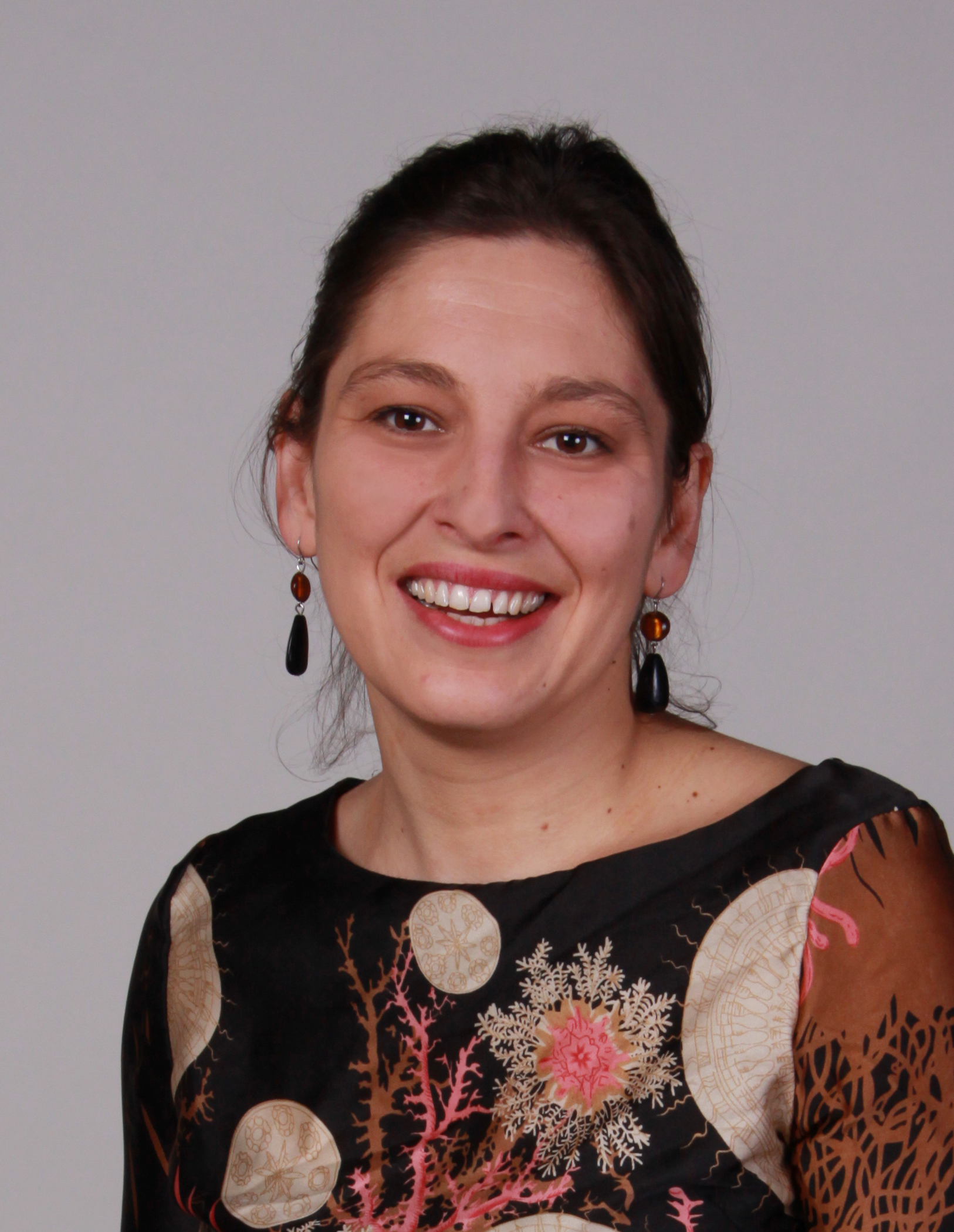
- Járóka in 2014

Member of the European Parliament
- In office 15 September 2017 – 15 July 2024
- In office 20 July 2004 – 30 June 2014

Vice-President of the European Parliament
- In office 15 November 2017 – 18 January 2022
- President: Antonio Tajani; David Sassoli; Roberta Metsola (Acting)

Personal details
- Born: 6 October 1974 (age 51) Tata, People's Republic of Hungary
- Party: Fidesz
- Children: 2
- Profession: Politician

Lívia Renáta Járóka (born 6 October 1974) is a Hungarian politician. She is a Member of the European Parliament, first elected as part of the Fidesz list in 2004. Járóka is the second Romani (and the first Romani woman) ever elected to the European Parliament (after Juan de Dios Ramírez Heredia from Spain, who served from 1986 to 1999).

Járóka grew up in Sopron, a town near Hungary's western border with Austria. Her father is ethnically Roma, her mother Hungarian. After getting an MA in sociology from the Warsaw campus of the Central European University on a scholarship from the Open Society Institute she went on to study anthropology in Britain, focusing on Romani issues and culture. In August 2003 she had a daughter and a son in 2007. In 2012 she finished her PhD in Social Anthropology at the University College London.

Járóka has been criticized as an apologist for the treatment of Hungarian Roma by her party, Fidesz. She has also declined to criticize Fidesz' campaign against George Soros, and the party's attacks on her alma mater, the Central European University.

== Memberships ==
She was a member of the Committee on Women's Rights and Gender Equality and the Delegation for relations with South Africa. She was a substitute member of the Committee on Employment and Social Affairs, as well the Delegation for relations with the Korean Peninsula.

In 2014 she retired as an MEP but returned on 15 September 2017 after Ildikó Gáll-Pelcz left the European Parliament. She was elected a Vice-President of the European Parliament on 15 November 2017. She was re-elected in that position on 3 July 2019. She served as Vice-President until 17 January 2022.

== Personal life ==
She is married and has two children.

== Other memberships ==
- Roma Education Fund
- High Level Group of Roma Diplomacy Program
- European Roma Information Office
- Prior Board Member of Open Society Institute, Roma Memorial University Scholarship Program

== Research activities ==
- September 2000-April 2002: Ethnographic field research on assimilation tendencies of Roma in Hungary
- May 1998-May 2001: Sociological research among Roma students of Gandhi Gimnazium, Hungary
- 2000 - 2003 University College of London, PhD research on ethnic relations and economics, identity and radicalisation in cultural self-representation of the young Roma in the 8. District, an urban slum in Budapest

== Awards ==
- Elected Young Global Leader in 2006 by the Forum of Young Global Leaders and the World Economic Forum
- 2006 and 2013 Member of the European Parliament of the Year (MEP) award in the category of Justice and Fundamental Rights
- Awarded the Romanian Foreign Ministry's Excellency Award for the Social Integration of Minorities in 2010
- Awarded the Presidential Order of Merit of Hungary for her outstanding work during the Hungarian Presidency of the Council of the EU in 2011
- Won the St. Adalbert Award of the Hungarian Association of Christian Intellectuals in 2011
- Award of the "Fundación Secretariado Gitano" in 2012
