= 100.6 FM =

FM radio frequency

The following radio stations broadcast on FM frequency 100.6 MHz:

== Egypt ==
- Nogoum FM is the first private radio station in Egypt, started in 2003, based in the Egyptian Media Production City.

== China ==
- CNR Business Radio in Mianyang
- CNR China Traffic Radio in Hohhot
- CNR Music Radio in Xining
- The Voice of Jingjinji in Beijing
- Yunfu General Radio in Yunfu

== Malaysia ==
- My in Ipoh, Sandakan and Seremban

== United Kingdom ==
- Classic FM in London
- BFBS Northern Ireland in Lisburn
- 100.6 MHz FM Online station broadcasting from London
