= Ethnic media =

Media targeted at a specific ethnic group

Ethnic media is media fashioned with a particular ethnic minority group or ethnic minority community in mind and is often marginalized in mainstream, popular media. Several countries maintain public service channels for the ethnic minorities.

== Definition ==
Academic Yu Shi tenders an operational definition for ethnic media: “Ethnic media are often regarded as media by and for ethnics in a host country with content in ethnic languages." Shi also adds, ethnic media “can be published by big ethnic media groups and by small organic ethnic communities”, as well.

Practitioner Inga Buchbinder of New America Media adds, “Our organization defines it most as a publication, whether that’s news, television, radio, online, print, magazine--any sort of publication that caters to a specific ethnic community. And it could be in-language…or it could be bilingual that reaches a very specific community.”

In addition to news, television, radio, online, print, and magazine outlets that qualify as ethnic media, academic John D.H. Downing adds musical culture and forms of religious expression to the ethnic media mix. Downing finds, “these may, along with language and dialect, act as a media force somewhere between shock absorption and psychic validation in the often-fraught atmosphere between the ethnic majority and ethnic minorities.”

Downing finds that ethnic media tends to circulate, “within at least three different sectors, namely, indigenous nations and communities, recent migrants…and settled subordinate ethnic groups.”

== Ethnic media as alternative media ==
Analogous to the debate as to what qualifying factors constitute alternative media, the domain of what qualifying factors that classify a respective ethnic media outlet as an alternative media outlet is also, at play.

Thus, ethnic media is not by definitional default alternative media.

Again, the work of academics and grassroots practitioners, such as John D.H. Downing, Yu Shi, Clemencia Rodriguez, and Inga Buchbinder of New America Media provide definitional assistance for this complex and overdetermined zone. Discernment of whether or not a respective ethnic media outlet qualifies as an alternative media outlet is dependent upon the outstanding contextual information, and should be assessed on a case by case evaluation.

Yu Shi's work puts forth a seven-pronged test for evaluating the “alternative media role” of ethnic media in the United States: “reference has to be made to their (1) individual place of origin, (2) historical evolution, (3) production process, (4) distribution pattern, (5) ownership, (6) self-identity (non-profit or for-profit; alternative or commercial; or in between), and (7) connection to power groups in local and transnational settings.”

== Examples of ethnic media ==
- Black Enterprise Magazine.
- Black Entertainment Television (BET).
- Ebony.
- Essence Magazine.
- Jet Magazine.
- Latina Magazine.
- Telemundo Television Network.
- Univision Television Network.
- My own media - in the UK.
- I-Italy.
- Italian American Voice.
- Jewish Daily Forward - continuation as The Forward, Jewish newspaper.
- Hoy - Spanish newspaper in New York City.
- Indian Country Today - Native American newspaper.
- KIRN radio in Persian in Southern California.
- KREA radio in Korean in Greater Los Angeles.
- KTNN radio in Navajo on the Navajo Nation, Arizona.
- La Opinion of Los Angeles, California in Spanish.
- The Irish Call based in Boston, Massachusetts.
- Cherokee Phoenix - Cherokee newspaper in Oklahoma.

== Examples of ethnic alternative media ==
- Chicago Defender - African American.
- Freedom's Journal - African American.
- New Pittsburgh Courier - African American.
- North Star - African American.
- Philadelphia Tribune - African American.
- The New York Amsterdam News - African American.

== See also ==
- The Abolitionist Movement
- The Black Power Movement
- Clemencia Rodriguez
- Citizens' Media
- German American journalism
- Irish American journalism
- John DH Downing
- Minority language broadcasting
- New America Media
- The Pittsburgh Courier's Double V Campaign
- Romani media
