= Multicultural marketing =

Multicultural marketing, also known as ethnic marketing, is a strategic approach in marketing aimed at specific ethnic audiences distinct from the majority culture within a country, often referred to as the "general market." This practice leverages the unique cultural attributes of ethnic groups—including language, traditions, celebrations, and religious practices—to effectively communicate with and persuade these audiences. In multicultural societies like the United States, marketers utilize cultural and ethnic diversity to develop targeted consumer segments. This entails tailoring marketing initiatives directly to the cultural insights and preferences of diverse consumer groups.

Multicultural marketing strategies acknowledge and cater to the diverse perceptions, motivations, and beliefs among consumers from different cultural backgrounds. By integrating cultural norms from various ethnicities, businesses enhance the visibility of their products or services, demonstrating a genuine appreciation for cultural diversity (De-Mooij, 2015). Success in multicultural marketing requires a deep understanding and respect for these cultural nuances, enabling businesses to engage effectively with diverse markets globally (Wilkinson & Cheng, 1999).

In contrast, international marketing focuses on analyzing national-level data to understand market dynamics across different countries. International marketers assess factors such as gross national income per capita, education levels, media accessibility, retail infrastructure, and product preferences at the national scale (De-Mooij, 2015). This approach incorporates cultural values at the national level to discern variations in consumer behavior, which are often influenced by cultural factors rather than purely economic considerations.

Cultural values in international marketing are typically evaluated through primary and secondary data sources. Primary data involves direct assessments via surveys or experiments, while secondary data includes scores on national cultural dimensions. Individual-level studies further refine this understanding by collecting and analyzing data at the individual level, which is then aggregated to measure national cultural tendencies and their impact on consumer behavior (Demangeot et al., 2015).

Multicultural marketing strategies, also known as "ethnic marketing" or "cross-cultural marketing," employ distinct techniques to engage with ethnic markets. The term "ethnic market" refers to cultures distinct from the dominant culture in a company's local context. Effective multicultural marketing involves recognizing and embracing the traditions, beliefs, values, norms, language, and religious practices of target ethnic groups. This customization allows marketers to tailor their strategies to meet the specific needs and preferences of diverse cultural segments.

== History ==
Multiculturalism was regarded as a problem, in Australia attempts were made to reduce cultural heterogeneity by restricting immigration to white Europeans (Wilkinson & Cheng, 1999). This idea was swiftly abandoned. Other issues included adapting to the customs and traditions of new countries, tensions between ethnic communities of historical origins (Wilkinson & Cheng, 1999). Recently the focus has shifted onto the benefits of multiculturalism, and how it can potentially increase domestic and international brand recognition (De Mooij, 2015).

Economical, political, and social suggestions of this cultural mix cannot be ignored and has become widely recognised, for example the Australian Broadcasting Commission in 1995 took a significant step in ensuring that several cultures were taken into consideration and allowed for the best television programs to be sourced from around the world to cater to the needs of different cultural groups, airing programs from Asia and Europe, this directly influenced its ratings and achieved larger audiences (Wilkinson & Cheng, 1999). Various other types of products and services have been developed or adapted for the multicultural domestic market. For example, Chtaura Dairy products introduced Middle Eastern recipes for their dairy products.

Multicultural marketing did not increase in general society until the late 1960s where the potential of the ethnic market was first addressed. (Rugimbana & Nwankwo, 2003). Since then, multicultural marketing has slowly developed and the 1990s hit a peak when businesses began to recognize the value of targeting the ethnic market. Large companies such as Coca-Cola have invested in a multicultural marketing scheme, after realizing the potential of the ethnic market for the growth of their business. (Rugimbana & Nwankwo, 2003).

== Multicultural markets ==
Two types of needs in a multicultural domestic market need to be considered. Firstly, the needs of people with different cultural backgrounds and secondly, the needs resulting from these values, perceptions, and preferences of cultural groups in the role products and services play in their lives (Demangeot et al., 2015).

Multicultural markets represent an important focal lens for international marketing and cross-cultural consumer research, in view of their growing economic importance and of their theoretical difference from other types of marketplaces. Changes in infrastructure, technology, economic development and consumer mobility have increased cultural interactions consequently an increase in multicultural market demand. Traditionally marketing research was based on static values; marketing is now viewed as more dynamic (Demangeot et al., 2015). Multicultural marketing is becoming a focal point of marketing research (De-Mooij, 2015).

== Multicultural marketing strategy ==
Marketing strategy is centred around a goal of increasing sales and achieving a competitive advantage, marketing strategies can be short and long term (Kotler, Burton, Deans, Brown, & Armstrong, 2013). Multicultural marketing strategies focus on adapting businesses value propositions to specific cultural groups to establish a multicultural target market (Demangeot et al., 2015). The marketing mix and the 4Ps (product, price, promotion and place (channels) play a role in establishing a marketing strategy (Kotler et al., 2013).

A marketing mix allows you to focus on goals and establish channels to communicate with the target market of the product or service. For a multicultural strategy to succeed, several factors must be addressed including creating a brand message that appeals to people of several different cultures and ethnicity using the available promotion channels that are touch points for the target market (including television, social media, radio, and websites) (Burrell, 2015). To create a good multicultural marketing strategy, it is also important to work with individuals and agencies that understand the targeted consumer's lifestyles. Multicultural thinking must be incorporated into core overall brand strategy to respect cultures and build mutual trust (Burrell, 2015). In 2019, Entrepreneur writer Christine Michel Carter named Burrell Communications Group as one of the largest global multicultural marketing firms. Burrell Communications Group was founded in 1971. Its clients include Toyota, McDonald's, and Coca-Cola.

Consumer purchases are influenced by cultural, social, personal and psychological influences (Kotler et al., 2013). These factors cannot be controlled but they can be accounted for while coming up with a marketing mix (Kotler et al., 2014). Culture is the base of a person's wants and behaviour. Growing up in society, a child learns basic values, perceptions, wants and behaviours from their family and other role models. Marketers decide to which degree they adapt their product and marketing programs to meet the unique cultures and needs of consumers in various markets

Promotion needs to be in the context of today's social and cultural differences. Companies can adapt to the same promo strategy to as the home market or adapt for each local market. The product, communication adoption involves modifying the message so that it fits with different cultural environments (Kotler et al., 2013). Product adaptation is changing the product to meet local needs, condition or wants or creating something new for the forging market is Product intervention (Kotler et al., 2013).

== The reasons for multicultural advertising ==
The word “multicultural” is including people who have different customs and beliefs and multicultural consumer is any consumer who has two or more cultural or ethnic background or affiliation; in fact, they exhibit a contextual cultural identity that allows them to show different features of lifestyle, culture, etc. (the Wharton University of Pennsylvania, n.d). Therefore, marketers have to spot that they must develop their approach to account for this dynamic and fluid identity (Perez & Frank, 2011). While overall standards for a “good ad” are similar across group, cross-cultural customers actually need personal relevant to create ads more attractive to them.

In multicultural environments, the overall makeup of society is diverse, influencing the need for a multi-cultural approach to marketing strategies (Rugimbana & Nwankwo, 2003). The saying “one size fits all” no longer applies and strategies must be established to successfully communicate with all cultures through marketing techniques. ‘Culture’ has a large influence on marketing strategies as it affects communication channels, consumer behaviour and advertising standards and norms. (De-mooij, 2014) De-mooij also acknowledges that consumers are not the same worldwide, and their thought patterns and purchasing decisions differ depending usually on overall wealth of the country and other socio-economic factors (2014).

Adopting multicultural marketing strategies also allows businesses to gain a unique competitive advantage. It has been proven that consumers make purchasing decisions based on social, personal, cultural and physiological factors. (Kotler, Burton, Deans, Brown, & Armstrong, 2013). Once these factors are recognized and the marketer knows what factors entice a multicultural consumer to purchase, strategies can be executed to appeal to the market through their physiological needs.

== Value of multicultural marketing ==
There are three main values of Multicultural Marketing (Rayo & Artieda, 2011). First of all is innovation – thanks for this type of marketing, the marketer and the companies have to be always creative to find a new solution, develop new products and marketing strategies. The second value of multicultural marketing is growth – which is the increase in sales and marketplace for the company's brand. Finally, collaboration can be considered as the third value of cross-cultural marketing, which can bring people together and promote the brand and company.

== Skills required ==
It is suggested that the following skills are required in the field of multicultural marketing.

1. To spot patterns that allow subcultures to be grouped together, so that a common marketing strategy may be extended to several subcultures in a group (“transcultural” marketing)
2. To develop a distinct marketing strategy for each subculture, if there is a significantly distinct cultural dimension that is important to the specific culture (multicultural marketing)
3. To further segment audiences in a subculture, if needed, in terms of cultural affinity, cultural identity or acculturation level (tactical adaptation within a subculture)
4. To develop parameters of culturally acceptable marketing stimuli; and
5. To establish a protocol for measuring cultural effectiveness of the stimuli.

This process is also known as ethnic marketing.

== Creating and refreshing a multicultural marketing strategy ==
=== Creating a multicultural marketing strategy ===
Multicultural marketing focuses on customizing messaging and marketing channels for each target group, as opposed to simply translating a general message into different languages, or including token representation of different ethnic groups in imagery (Stachura & Murphy, 2005).

A multicultural marketing strategy should be multi-faceted, realistic and implemented consistently over time.

In addition, there are four rules to make a cross-cultural marketing strategy:

- make your marketing bilingual (or multilingual): in the world market in general and in some specific large markets, consumers speak a range of different languages.
- make sure digital marketing tactics match values and behavior
- use entertainment and music as marketing tools, and
- develop cohesive content and programming (Wright, 2015).

There are five orders for a description of marketing strategy:

- detail the specific activities that are intended to be undertaken,
- identify the target audience for each activity,
- specify how to measure success,
- be flexible enough for allowing adjustments,
- and finally, stipulate who is responsible for each activity (Klausner, 2013).

A similar list of steps appeared in Rayo & Artieda, 2011:

1. Identify objectives and markets, and the target customer and their characteristics.
2. The strategy should identify potential consumer touch points like a comfort zone, language or tradition, culture, etc.
3. Identify the media that makes sense for the marketing goals.
4. The marketer must evaluate the approach and learn from others’ mistakes.
5. Finally, the strategy must connect to the culture by understanding and respecting customers' culture and tradition, building trust and connection with them in evocative ways, then making the brand multicultural friendly.

== Pioneers ==
Pioneers in the field of multicultural marketing include Madam C. J. Walker, African-American businesswoman, hair care entrepreneur, Procter and Gamble, McDonald's, Pepsi cola and Benetton, and the entrepreneur Francesco Costa with My Own Media and ISI Holding in the foreigner services sector, Joseph Assaf with Ethnic Business Awards, Alan M. Powell CEO of AP & Associates, and Saad Saraf with Mediareach Advertising (UK).

== See also ==
- Ethnic media
- EMMA
- Alternative media

== More reading ==
Burrell, Y. (2015). Branding your agency's multicultural marketing strategy. Public Relations Tactics, 22(6), 9.

Demangeot, Catherine; Broderick, Amanda J.; Craig, C. Samuel (2015). "Multicultural marketplaces". International Marketing Review. 32 (2): 118. doi:10.1108/IMR-01-2015-0017.

De Mooij, Marieke (2015). "Cross-cultural research in international marketing: Clearing up some of the confusion". International Marketing Review. 32 (6): 646–662. doi:10.1108/IMR-12-2014-0376.

Kotler, P., Burton, S., Deans, K., Brown, L., & Armstrong, G. (2013). Marketing (9th ed., pp. 5, 35–43, 296, 526). Australia: Pearson. Wilkinson, I. F., & Cheng, C. (1999). Perspectives: Multicultural marketing in Australia. Journal of International Marketing, 7(3), 106–125.
