= Radio Beijing International =

Beijing; China
- Broadcast area: Beijing
- Frequencies: 92.3 (MHz); 774 (kHz)
- Branding: Beijing Waiyu Guangbo

Programming
- Format: "foreign" (non-Chinese)

Ownership
- Owner: Beijing Ren Min Guangbo Dian Tai

History
- Call sign meaning: "Waiyu" means foreign language

Links
- Website: https://web.archive.org/web/20060903114818/http://am774.bjradio.com.cn:80/

Radio Beijing International (Chinese: 北京外语广播, literally Beijing Foreign Language Broadcast) is a radio station which broadcasts on FM92.3 AM774. The radio station is part of the Radio Beijing Corporation.

There are many languages represented on this radio station including Japanese and English with the commercials, announcements and station identification done in Mandarin Chinese.
