= My Own Media =

- Industry: Publisher
- Founded: 2000
- Headquarters: London, UK
- Area served: Europe
- Key people: Francesco Costa (Founder) Stefano Camilloni (Director)
- Products: Mass media; Magazines; Newspapers; Web portals; Advertising
- Website: www.myownmedia.co.uk

My Own Media is an international editorial network of Isi Holding Group, founded by Francesco Costa and Gianluca Luciano in 2000 under the name of Stranieri in Italia. Over the years, the company has created editorial offices and 16 foreign language newspapers, with a monthly circulation of more than 300,000 copies; mainly free press, but also newspapers sold at newsstands. Some examples of editorial products: 'Gazeta Romaneasca', published in Romanian with an average circulation of 10,000 copies per week; 'Nasz Swiat' and 'Bota Shqiptare', fortnightly magazines in Polish and Albanian, on newsstands with 8,000 and 14,000 copies per month, respectively. To date, the printing of these magazines has been completely replaced by web portals. In 2012, the group launched the start-up Migreat by opening new offices in London. Today, My Own Media is based in London and is focused on providing the latest news on immigration policies and relevant legislation. The company is currently headed by Italian manager Stefano Camilloni.

My Own Media publishes fourteen web portals in ten different languages.

== See also ==
- Ethnic media
- Foreign-born population of the United Kingdom
