= Radio Botswana 2 =

- Type: Radio network
- Country: Botswana
- Availability: FM: Botswana
- Launch date: 1992

Radio Botswana 2- abbr RB2 is a radio station in Botswana operated by the Government of Botswana in the capital city Gaborone. The Radio station provides news, current affairs about the country Botswana, the culture of Botswana, education and also provides entertainment to its followers.

== History ==
Radio Botswana 2 started its 24-hour (24/7) broadcast on 1965 as a secondary broadcaster in Botswana after Radio Botswana. Radio Botswana was developed with the aid of the South African citizen who was also the former police radio officer during that time by the name Peter Nel. Radio Botswana served the nationals and was transmitted at an output of 500 watts. The station came on air at 3356 kHz. Radio Bechuanaland started operating in a police station located in a small town called Lobatse. The main focus of this station was to bring people closer to information about their small country (arts, culture and entertainment).

== See also ==
- Radio Botswana
- Yarona FM
- Media in Botswana
