= Beijing News Radio =

Beijing News Radio 北京新闻广播
Beijing; China
- Frequencies: FM: 90.4 MHz or 94.5 MHz; AM: 828 kHz

Programming
- Format: All-news radio

Ownership
- Owner: Beijing Ren Min Guangbo Dian Tai

Links
- Website: http://am828.bjradio.com.cn/

Beijing News Radio (Chinese: 北京新闻广播) is a radio station in Beijing, China. The radio station broadcasts on AM 828 kHz, FM 90.4 MHz and 94.5 MHz. The station is part of the Radio Beijing Corporation.

== Local Beijing news ==
Although this channel covers news of interest to China, there is a special emphasis on news within Beijing itself, especially surrounding activity leading up to the Beijing 2008 Olympics. Examples of stories that have played are:

- Kidnapping of a local restaurant owner's son by thieves who wanted money in return.
- Use of Chinglish/Engrish on many Beijing road signs. The news reported that there were major efforts to clean this up before the Olympics.
- Beijing traffic reports (frequent updates similar to WINS Radio in New York City). See also Beijing Jiaotong Tai.

== China news focus ==
At a national level, this channel tends to focus on activity happening in China. Examples of such articles include:

- Three Gorges Dam faces new challenges.
- The recent college entrance exams that determine the future of many young people of whether they get to go to school or would they have to start working.
- The Qinghai-Tibet Railroad was opened back in July 2006 and coverage of how much traffic was on that train.
- The Mid Autumn Festival starts in October. This includes coverage of the opening of chartered flights to Taiwan for this festival.
- National Day in China
- In February 2007, there was much coverage of the Spring Festival.
- June 25 – July 1, 2007, there was coverage of the "Hong Kong 10th Anniversary" (Program Name: "Xiang Gang Shi Nian"). On this week, almost all other news has been pre-empted including the 2007 London Car Bombings coverage.

== International News Focus ==
See also China Radio International (same news, but in English as well as other languages)

At an international level, this channel tends to focus on China's point of view of world events. Although the news may be the same as played on radio stations in the United States or Europe, the focus is usually on China's view of the same event:

- China's position on the Iran Nuclear Standoff. There was no mention of any problem during the entire article other than the "U.S. wants Iran to ....." (the tone used in most cases).
- Chinese hostages in Africa.
  - In fact, the radio station broadcast that China was willing to "do whatever it takes" to get the prisoners back. This probably included bargaining with the hostage-takers, although they never mentioned how this was going to be handled.
- Tensions with China on the Yasukuni Shrine visits by the previous Japanese prime minister.
