= European Roma Information Office =

European Roma Information Office (ERIO) is an international advocacy organization for Romani people based in Brussels, established on 18 March 2003 with Angéla Kóczé as the Director, announced on the Balkan Human Rights List by way of the Greek Helsinki Monitor.

ERIO promotes political and public discussion on Roma issues by providing factual and in-depth information on a range of policy issues to the European Union institutions, Roma civil organisations, governmental authorities and intergovernmental bodies.

In 2005 Ivan Ivanov, previously an attorney for the Budapest-based European Roma Rights Center (ERRC), become the director, taking over from the CEO Valeriu Nicolae.

== Members ==
Network members include:

- Albania : Roma Union "Amaro Drom"
- Bosnia Herzegovina : Association "Be My Friend"
- Belgium : The Flemish Minority Center
- Bulgaria : Alternative Association "Biala Slatina"; Center for Interethnic Dialogue and Tolerance "Amalipe"; Equal Access Foundation; Association "Every Child"; "Nevo Drom" Association; "The Health of Romany people" Foundation; Tolerance and Mutual Aid Foundation; TV Roma
- Croatia : Romani Women's Association of Croatian Roma Union; Romani women NGO "Better life"; Roma Women's Organization "For a Better Future"; Organization "Golden Roma Heart" organization for education and training of children of ethnic minorities, the resolution of status and social issues and help elderly and disabled people
- Czech Republica : Dzeno Association
- Denmark : Romano Association
- Estonia : North-Estonian Roma Association
- Finland : Association Nevo Roma
- France : Association "Rome Europe"; USETA - The Social Education Union of Roma from d'Aquitaine
- Germany : Rom e.V.
- Greece : Panhellenic Federation of Greek Roma
- Hungary : Hungarian Foundation for Self-Reliance
- Ireland : Irish Traveller Movement
- Israel : Roma Virtual Network
- Italy : Association "Amalipe Romanó"; Association "Thèm Romanó Onlus"; "Opera Nomadi - Sezione di Milano Onlus"
- Moldova : Democratic Union of Roma from Moldova; Secrétariat for the Roma Negotiation Group
- Romania : The Association and Group for the Initiative of Young Roma from Buzau; Association "Our Brothers"; Resource Center for Roma Communities Foundation; Roma Women Association in Romania; Romanitin -Roma Youth and Students' Association; "Romani C.R.I.S.S." - Romani Center for Social Intervention and Studies; Association "Romano Euro-Drom"; Social/Cultural Foundation of Roma
- Serbia & Montenegro : Kosovo Roma Refugee Foundation
- Slovakia : Asociácia na podporu vzdelávania Rómov na Slovensku (Association for support of education of Roma people in Slovakia); Cultural Association of Roma in Slovakia
- Spain : Federació d'Asociacions Gitanes de Catalunya
- Sweden : Community Development Forum
- Turkey : Roman Dernekleri Federasyonu Baskani (Roma Federation); Sulukule Roman Kültürünü Gelistirme ve Dayanisma Dernegi (Sukulule Romani Culture and Development Association)
- United States : Association "Sa-Roma"
- Ukraine : Roma Women Charitable Fund
