= NRK Stortinget =

Norwegian digital radio channel

Coordinates: 59°56′07″N 10°43′07″E

NRK Stortinget (NRK Parliament) was a Norwegian digital radio channel operated by the Norwegian Broadcasting Corporation (NRK).

Created in 2000 to increase the transparency of political debate by providing an insight into the work of the Norwegian legislature, the Storting, it broadcast live parliamentary debates and other proceedings via DAB and on-line as well as using a part of the FM network around the larger cities. The transmissions via DAB ceased in 2007, and the service was later withdrawn in its entirety.

== See also ==
- C-SPAN
