= Beijing Yinyue Tai =

Contemporary hit radio station in Beijing

Beijing Music Radio

Beijing; China
- Broadcast area: Beijing
- Frequency: 97.4 MHz

Programming
- Language: Chinese
- Format: Contemporary hit radio; Mandopop

Ownership
- Owner: Beijing Ren Min Guangbo Dian Tai

History
- Call sign meaning: "Yinyue" means music

Beijing Music Radio (Chinese: 北京音乐广播), is a commercial radio station broadcasting at 97.4 FM in Beijing, China.

== Music played ==
Beijing Yinyue Guangbo plays various types of music including:

- Classical music
- Mandopop and Cantopop
- English various formats including English Top 40, hot adult contemporary, and country music.

They also have news on every hour that is from Beijing Xinwen Guangbo radio station.

== Special programs ==
=== Mid Autumn and Spring Festival programming ===
On occasion, Beijing Yinyue Guangbo will broadcast live concerts around the Mid Autumn Festival and Spring Festival. The live concerts would pre-empt programs that are broadcast during the week at any other time.

=== Interviews with famous artists ===
On the weekends especially during the evenings, this station frequently broadcasts pre-recorded or live interviews with artists.

=== "Top 40" Countdown ===
The "top 40" countdown, the Chinese title uses the English phrase, is a countdown of current Mandarin pop songs. This program occurs Saturday and Sunday nights (Beijing Time) and plays the most popular 40 songs in China for that week. This program does not include any English or Cantonese top 40 songs even though the station does occasionally play them during other times of the day.

Every week, Beijing Music Radio broadcasts "The Week's New" chart, based on people's voting.
