= Beijing Public Service Radio =

北京城市广播副中心之声 Beijing Public Service Radio

Beijing; China
- Broadcast area: Beijing
- Frequencies: 107.3 (MHz); 1026 (KHz)

Programming
- Format: "public service"

Ownership
- Owner: Beijing Ren Min Guangbo Dian Tai

Links
- Website: http://fm1073.bjradio.com.cn/show.asp?uver=cn

Beijing Public Service Radio (Chinese: 北京城市广播副中心之声) is a radio station located in Beijing, China. It generally broadcasts local news about events within Beijing. The station broadcasts on FM 107.3 in Beijing, China and is one of the stations in the Beijing Ren Min Guangbo Dian Tai group.
