= Beijing Sports Radio =

Radio station in China

- Beijing; China
- Frequency: 102.5 MHz

Programming
- Format: Sports/Variety

Ownership
- Owner: Beijing Ren Min Guangbo Dian Tai

History
- Former frequencies: 927 kHz

Links
- Website: https://web.archive.org/web/20061004112431/http://am927.bjradio.com.cn:80/

Beijing Sports Radio (Chinese: 北京体育广播) is a radio station that broadcasts at 102.5 FM in Beijing, China. The station is part of the Radio Beijing Corporation.

The recent focus of this radio station has been the World Cup in Germany and the Beijing Olympic Games for 2008.

Before 2017, the Sports Radio also has an AM frequency, 927 kHz; this frequency is now used by Beijing Youth Radio.

The sports that are broadcast often on this station are:

- F1
- Chess
- Volleyball
- Football (soccer)
- Tennis
- Ping pong (International Table Tennis Federation coverage in Chinese)
- Basketball
- China Soccer

== See also ==
- CCTV-5 - Beijing Sports Television Channel
