= DWBR-AM =

Philippine radio station

Radyo Bahá'í (DWBR)
- Talavera; Philippines
- Broadcast area: Nueva Ecija
- Frequency: 1584 kHz
- Branding: Radyo Bahá'í

Programming
- Languages: English, Filipino
- Format: Baháʼí Faith

Ownership
- Owner: Dawnbreakers Foundation

History
- First air date: November 26, 2002
- Call sign meaning: Bahá'í R'adio

Technical information
- Licensing authority: NTC
- Class: B
- Power: 1,000 watts

Links
- Website: www.bahai.org.ph

DWBR (1584 AM) is a radio station owned and operated by the Dawnbreakers Foundation. The station's studio and transmitter are located at #271 Zone 1, Brgy. Bulac, Talavera, Nueva Ecija.
