= Beijing Radio and Television Station =

Television network in China

Beijing Radio and Television Station 北京广播电视台
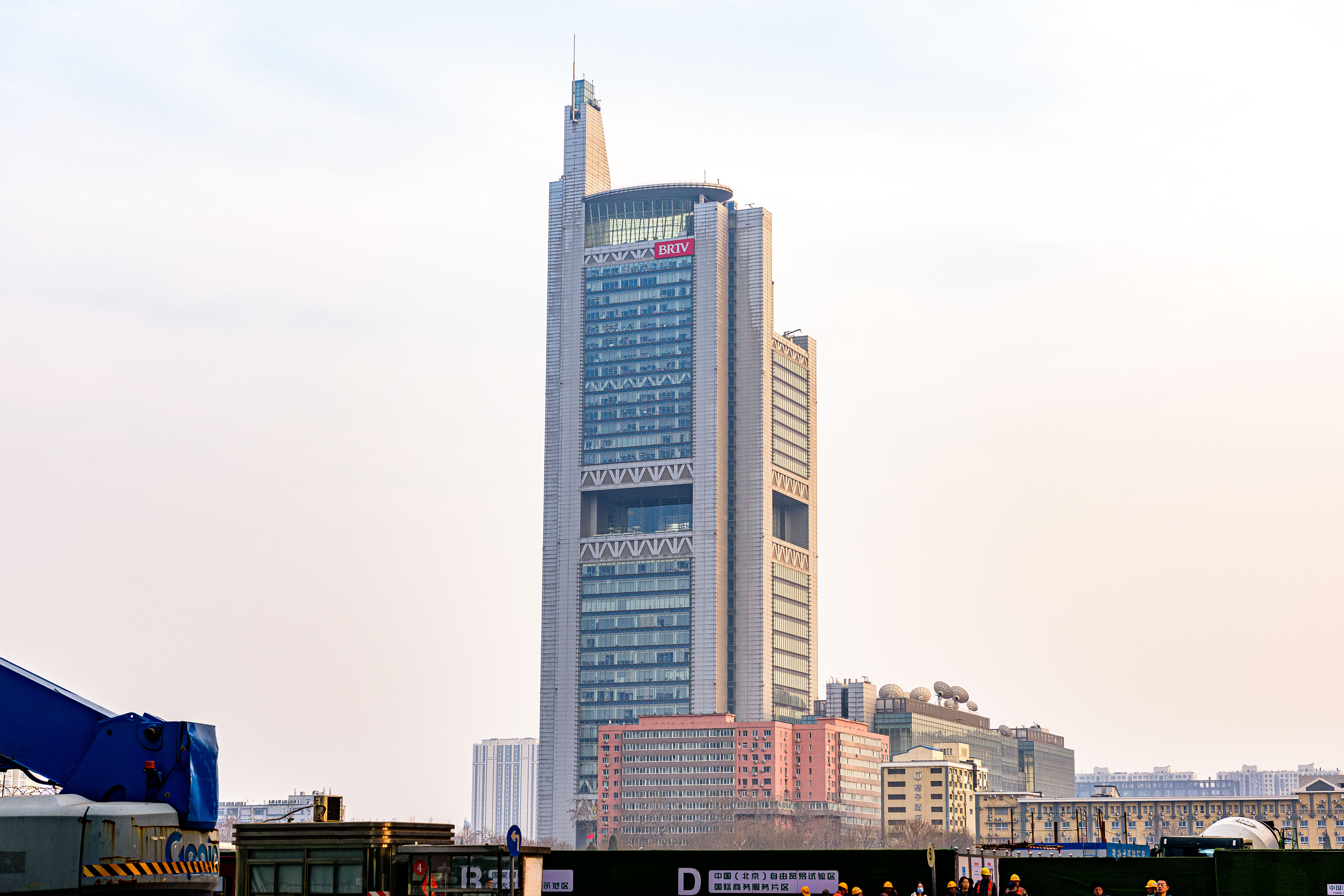
- Type: Broadcast; state media
- Country: China
- Availability: in Beijing, Tianjin, Hebei and other parts in China
- Founded: 1 May 1979
- Owner: Beijing Municipal People's Government
- Official website: www.brtv.org.cn

Beijing Radio and Television Station (BRTV), formerly Beijing Media Network (BMN), is a government-owned television network in China. It broadcasts from Beijing. The channel is available only in Chinese. Broadcasts in Beijing are on AM, FM, cable FM, digital radio, digital TV and online.

Beijing Media Network was founded on 16 May 1979. It covers China, Asia and North America. China Central Television was called Beijing Television from 1958 to 1978.

BTV started satellite broadcasts on 1 January 1998, during the drive caused by regional television stations to begin nationwide broadcasting and in line with the government's plan to increase the percentage of television viewers from 85% to 90% by 2000.

In October 2022, BRTV took a minority ownership stake in Kuaishou.

== History ==
Radio Beijing Corporation 北京人民广播电台
- Beijing; China
- Frequencies: FM 94.5 MHz FM 97.4 MHz, FM 100.6 MHz, FM 103.9 MHz, FM 107.3 MHz, AM 603 kHz, AM 774 kHz, AM 828 kHz, AM 927 kHz, Internet

Programming
- Format: Contemporary

History
- First air date: 1949

Links
- Website: http://www.rbc.cn/

Radio Beijing Corporation (RBC; Chinese: 北京人民广播电台; pinyin: Běijīng Rénmín Guǎngbō Diàntái, literally Beijing People's Broadcasting Station), was a family of municipal radio stations that also include news, music, and sports in Beijing.

BTV started broadcasting its television station on 16 May 1979, on VHF channel 6.

On 1 June 2020, Radio Beijing Corporation, together with Beijing Television and Beiguang Media, merged into Beijing Media Network.

Beijing Radio and Television Station
- Simplified Chinese: 北京人民广播电台
- Traditional Chinese: 北京人民廣播電臺
Transcriptions
Standard Mandarin
- Hanyu Pinyin: Běijīng Rénmín Guǎngbō Diàntái
Yue: Cantonese
- Jyutping: Bak^{1}ging^{1} Jan^{4}man^{4} Gwong^{2}bo^{3} Din^{6}toi^{4}

== List of Beijing Radio channels ==
As of 2021, all of these radio channels are also available via Internet.

Beijing Radio Stations
channel name		started airing date	Frequency	Description
English	Chinese	started airing date	Frequency	Description
Beijing News Radio	北京新闻广播	2 February 1949	AM 828 kHz; FM 90.4 MHz or 94.5 MHz	News (was using FM 100.6 MHz before 1 February 2021)
Beijing City Radio, Voice of MC	北京城市广播副中心之声	1 March 2005	AM 1026 kHz; FM 91.9 MHz or 107.3 MHz	formerly Beijing Public Service Radio, renamed to current name in 2020, focus on Beijing Municipal Administrative Center
Beijing Sports Radio, Voice of Dual-Olympics	北京体育广播双奥之声	1 January 2002	FM 102.5 MHz; Cabel FM 92.7 MHz	Sports Broadcast (AM 927 kHz stopped airing Sport Radio, and started airing Youth Radio in 2017), "Voice of Dual-Olympics" suffix added in 2019
Beijing Music Radio	北京音乐台	23 January 1993	FM 97.4 MHz; Cabel FM 94.6 MHz	Beijing Music Radio (Mandopop)
Beijing Traffic Radio	北京交通广播	18 December 1993	FM 95.6 MHz or 103.9 MHz	Traffic
Beijing Wenyi Radio	北京文艺广播	1 April 1994	FM 87.6 MHz; Cabel FM 93.8 MHz	Chinese Literature Broadcast
The Voice of Jingjinji	京津冀之声	February 2021	FM 100.6 MHz	Broadcast in Jingjinji area. Previously known as Beijing Metro Radio.

=== Former radio channels ===
- Beijing Jingji Radio - internet streaming only channel focus on financial, stopped on 1 January 2022
- Beijing Qingmeng Radio - internet streaming only channel focus on Blue Network Broadcast, stopped on 1 January 2022
- Beijing Tongsu Radio - FM 97.0 and internet streaming focus on Popular Music (Mandopop), stopped on 1 January 2022
- Beijing Shenghuo Radio - internet streaming only channel focus on Beijing City Life Broadcast, stopped on 1 January 2022
- Beijing Qingyinyue Radio - internet streaming only channel focus on Light Music Broadcast, stopped on 1 January 2022
- Beijing DAB Radio - internet streaming only channel focus on DAB Broadcast, stopped on 1 January 2022
- Beijing Story Radio - AM 603 kHz & FM 89.1 MHz focus on stories, stopped on 1 January 2023
- Radio Beijing International - AM 774 kHz & FM 92.3 MHz for foreign broadcasting, stopped on 1 January 2023
- Beijing Youth Radio - AM 927 kHz & FM 98.2 MHz for Youths, stopped on 1 January 2023
