= Beijing Traffic Radio =

- Beijing; China
- Broadcast area: Beijing
- Frequency: 103.9 (mHz)
- Branding: Beijing Jiaotong Guangbo

Programming
- Format: "traffic"

Ownership
- Owner: Beijing Renmin Guangbo Diantai

History
- Call sign meaning: "Jiaotong" means traffic

Links
- Website: http://www.fm1039.com.cn/index/

Beijing Traffic Radio (Chinese: 北京交通广播) is Beijing's traffic station at 103.9 FM. It is one of the radio stations of the Radio Beijing Corporation. This particular channel mostly broadcasts commercials in Mandarin and traffic reports. The format of this channel can be compared to the traffic channels provided by XM Radio and Sirius Satellite Radio, the commercial all-traffic station CHMJ in Vancouver, British Columbia, Canada, or the "Highway Advisory radio stations" (the low power AM stations near points along Interstate highways in the United States).

The station has one million listeners and its staff view 80% of Beijing's roads from its headquarters at the Beijing Traffic Management Bureau headquarters. It also has a network of retired volunteers with apartments at key junctions who are able to draw attention to major traffic problems.

The station also sponsors the largest leisure driving club in China, with 100 staff answering to club chief Chen Ming. The club offers members breakdown recovery services within the city's Fifth Ring Road, as well as organizing long-distance driving tours.
