= T8AA-FM =

Koror; Palau
- Frequency: 87.9 MHz
- Branding: Voice of Palau; Ngerel Belau; Eco Paradise FM; EPFM

Programming
- Languages: Palauan, English
- Format: News, Talk, Music

Ownership
- Owner: Government of Palau
- Sister stations: T8AA

History
- First air date: August 1, 1998; 27 years ago
- Call sign meaning: FM sister to T8AA

Technical information
- Power: 1,000 watts

Links
- Webcast: Voice of Palau's webstream

T8AA-FM (87.9 MHz), branded as Eco-Paradise FM (abbreviated as EPFM) is a radio station broadcasting from Koror, Palau. T8AA-FM is owned by the Government of Palau and co-owned with T8AA. T8AA-FM calls itself the "Voice of Palau".

Eco-Paradise FM competes against the private media outlet Talungab Media Company (television) and Palau Wave Radio.

== History ==
Eco-Paradise FM started broadcasts in 1998 and became a special member of the Japan FM Network on July 23, 2003. With this agreement, it took part in environmental events held by JFN, as well as receiving programs from Tokyo FM. In the 2000s, the station relayed the BBC World Service.

Eco-Paradise FM reinstated its relay stations in Peleliu and Angaur in 2016 after the AM antenna was knocked down due to the effects of Typhoon Bopha in 2012.

Thanks to Japanese aid, Eco-Paradise FM received funding to upgrade its infrastructure in 2022.

ABC Radio Australia's relays restarted on May 3, 2024 after an agreement signed between the two broadcasters.
