= The Voice of Jingjinji =

Beijing Shou Du Shenghuo Guangbo

Beijing; China
- Broadcast area: Beijing
- Frequency: 100.6 MHz
- Branding: Beijing Shou Du Shenghuo Guangbo

Programming
- Format: "city life"

Ownership
- Owner: Beijing Ren Min Guangbo Dian Tai

Links
- Website: https://web.archive.org/web/20060901112431/http://www.hiu.cn:80/am603/

The Voice of Jingjinji (Chinese: 京津冀之声, literally The Voice of Beijing, Tianjin & Hebei) is the radio station of Radio Beijing Corporation, broadcasting stories about Jing-Jin-Ji on FM100.6. It is previously known as Beijing Metro Radio (Chinese: 北京动听调频).
