= Romani media =

Media company

Romani media started to develop in the last decades, with an evolution influenced by the diasporic status of the Romani people (living as minority in many countries).

== Internet ==
The scattered status of the Roma people and the relatively recent evolution of the Romany media determined an important role for the Internet as fast and easy accessible means of communication. The Romany media presence on Internet includes news websites like Dženo Association, Romea.cz or dROMa-Blog (in German and Romani), also news networks like Roma Virtual Network.

== Television ==
There are Romany TV stations (like TV Šutel from Šuto Orizari, North Macedonia) or Romany programs at local TV stations, like Karavana le Romengiri, a Romany program presented on two hours per week rented by the Party of the Roma in Romania from Oglinda TV (the other content of this TV station has nothing in common with the Romany program, it just happened to be the one who accepted the lending). In Czech Republic there is an internet Romany TV - ROMEA TV. Most of the Romany TV stations are in Central and Southeastern Europe.

Roma Television was founded in Slovakia in 2010 by Jozef Šivák, a Roma journalist.

== Radio ==
- GipsyRadio: International 24-hours-web-radio in Romani language produced by members of the community on own authority. Offers windows to several associated organisations.
- Radio Romano: The Romani-language service of Radio Sweden.
- Három szólamra: Lovari and beas language ethnic program of Hungarian State Radio
- Radio Dikh
- Radio C

== Magazines ==
- dROMa - Romani politika, kultura, tschib: ISSN 2075-6976 Bilingual print magazine for the Romani community in Austria, published in German and Romani. No political or religious affiliation. Founded in 2004 by the Romani NGO "Verein Roma-Service". Free download of all issues (pdf) at: http://www.roma-service.at/droma/droma-2016.shtml
- È Romani Glinda / Den romska spegeln (The Romani Mirror; ISSN 1651-3258): Magazine devoted to Romani affairs in Sweden and Europe. No political affiliation. Cooperates closely with the Radio Romano team at Radio Sweden. Articles in Swedish. Publishes six issues per year. Founded 1998. Editor-in-chief and publisher: Fred Taikon. Website: http://www.RomaniGlinda.se
- Le Romané Nevimata / Romska nyheter (Romani News; ISSN 1653-963X): Magazine aimed at Romani youth in Sweden, published in cooperation with Romsk Kulturcentrum in Stockholm. No political affiliation. Articles in Romani and Swedish. Founded in 2007. Editor-in-chief and publisher: Kati Dimiter-Taikon.
- Romani Posten (also Romaniposten, The Romani Post; ISSN 0809-8379): Magazine for the Romani Traveller community in Norway. No political or religious affiliation. Articles in Norwegian. Published eight times per year. Founded 6 September 2003 as an on-line publication; first print edition October 2006. Publisher and editor-in-chief: Jone Pedersen. Website: http://www.romani-posten.com (now defunct)
