= Radio Botswana =

- Botswana

Ownership
- Owner: Government of Botswana
- Sister stations: Radio Botswana 2

History
- First air date: 1965

Radio Botswana- abbr RB1 is a radio station in Botswana operated by the Government of Botswana in the capital city Gaborone. The Radio station provides news, current affairs about the country Botswana, the culture of Botswana, education and also provides entertainment to its followers. Radio Botswana station 1 started diffusing to its crowd in the year 1965 and during that time it was initially called the Radio Bechuanaland before the country became independent. During the time it was called Radio Bechuanaland, the station got assistance of wave transmission from the Mafikeng Veterinary, and it served the department with communication covering a circle of 20 miles. The partnership between the Mafikeng veterinary and radio Bechuanaland was to broadcast the agricultural agenda/programmes.
Radio Bechuanaland from the year 1967 was on air at a band of 90 meters every night. The station is called Seroma mowa sa Botswana in Setswana language.

== Broadcast time ==
Radio Botswana broadcast still maintains broadcasting 7-day-a-week as mass medium with 18 hours each day in Setswana and English.

=== Podcasting ===
Radio Botswana is also available via podcast on the stations tunein account.

== History of Radio Bechuanaland ==
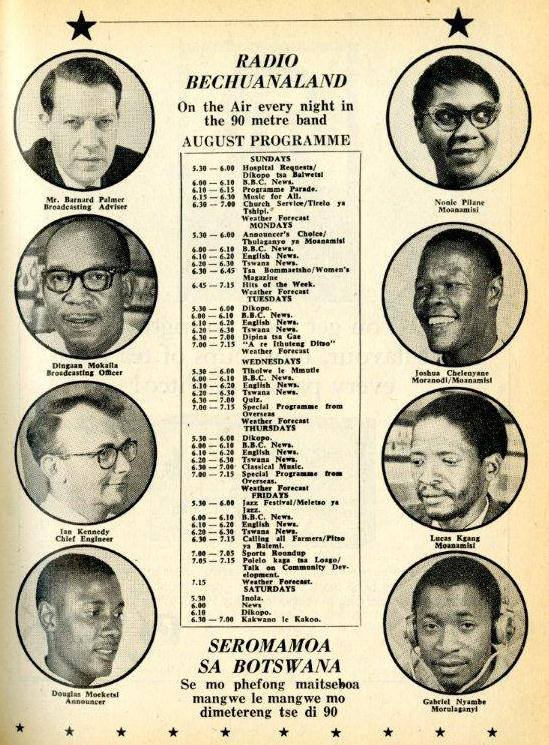
Radio Bechuanaland employees in the year 1968

The first radio signals were received in Bechuanaland in 1927. On 18 May 1934, a Bechuanaland Protectorate Resident Commissioner demanded the extension of the facilities to other parts of the colony.

Radio Bechuanaland started its 24-hour (24/7) broadcast in 1965 as a primary broadcaster in Botswana. Radio Bechuanaland was developed with the aid of the South African citizen who was also the former police radio officer during that time by the name Peter Nel. Radio Bechuanaland served the nationals and was transmitted at an output of 500 watts. The station came on air at 3356 kHz. Radio Bechuanaland started operating in a police station located in a small town called Lobatse. The main focus of this station was to bring people closer to information about their small country (arts, culture and entertainment).
1968
Radio Bechuanaland became part of the Ministry of home affairs department Botswana at the president's office which later formed the department called Information services.

During Apartheid rule in South Africa, Radio Botswana's programming was received in many Setswana-speaking areas of the country.

1978
Radio Bechuanaland officially joined the information and broadcasting services Botswana

=== Radio Bechuanaland programmes in 1966 ===
August programme
Sundays

- 5:30hrs to 6:00hrs ---------------> Hospital requests
- 6:00hrs to 6:10hrs ---------------> BBC news
- 6:10hrs to 6:15hrs ---------------> Programme parade
- 6:15hrs to 6:30hrs ---------------> Music for all
- 6:30hrs to 07:00hrs --------------> Church service
- Weather Forecast

Mondays

- 3:34hrs to 4:00hrs ---------------> Soccer news
- 4:00hrs to 4:10hrs ---------------> BBC news
- 4:10hrs to 4:20hrs ---------------> English news
- 4:20hrs to 4:30hrs ---------------> Tswana news
- 4:40hrs to 4:45hrs ---------------> Women's Magazine
- 4:45hrs to 7:15hrs ---------------> News of the week
- Weather forecast

Tuesdays

- 3:30hrs to 4:00hrs ----------------> Dikopo
- 4:00hrs to 4:30hrs ----------------> BBC news
- 4:30hrs to 4:40hrs ----------------> English news
- 4:40hrs to 4:50hrs ----------------> Tswana news
- 4:50hrs to 7:45hrs ----------------> Dipina tsa mo gae
- 7;45hrs to 7:50hrs ----------------> A re ithuteng ditso
- Weather forecast

Wednesdays

- 3:30hrs to 4:00hrs ----------------> Thuto ka mawatle
- 4:00hrs to 4:10hrs ----------------> BBC news
- 4:10hrs to 4:20hrs ----------------> English news
- 4:20hrs to 4:30hrs ----------------> Tswana news
- 4:30hrs to 7:00hrs ----------------> Classical music
- 7:00hrs to 7:15hrs ----------------> Special programme from overseas
- Weather forecast

Thursdays

- 3:30hrs to 4:00hrs ----------------> Thuto ka mawatle
- 4:00hrs to 4:10hrs ----------------> BBC news
- 4:10hrs to 4:20hrs ----------------> English news
- 4:20hrs to 4:30hrs ----------------> Tswana news
- 4:30hrs to 7:00hrs ----------------> Classical music
- 7:00hrs to 7:15hrs ----------------> Special programme from overseas
- Weather forecast

Fridays

- 3:30hrs to 4:00hrs ----------------> Festival/Meletso
- 4:00hrs to 4:10hrs ----------------> BBC news
- 4:10hrs to 4:20hrs ----------------> English news
- 4:20hrs to 4:30hrs ----------------> Tswana news
- 4:30hrs to 7:15hrs ----------------> Calling all farmers/Piletso ya balemi
- 7:15hrs to 7:25hrs ----------------> Talk on community development/Polelo ka tsa loago
- Weather forecast

Saturdays

- 3:30hrs ----------------> Inola
- 4:00hrs ------------------> News
- 4:14hrs -------------------> Dikopo
- 4:30hrs to 7:00hrs ----------------> Kakwano le kakoo

=== Radio Bechuanaland employees in 1966 ===
- Mr. Bernard Palmer: Broadcasting advisor
- Ian Kennedy : Chief engineer
- Lucas Kgang : Moanamisi
- Joshua chelenyane : Moanamisi
- Gabriel Nyammbe : Morulaganyi
- Douglas Moiketsi
- Noel Pilane: Moanamisi

Dingaan Mochila broadcasting officer

== Broadcasting in Bechuanaland ==
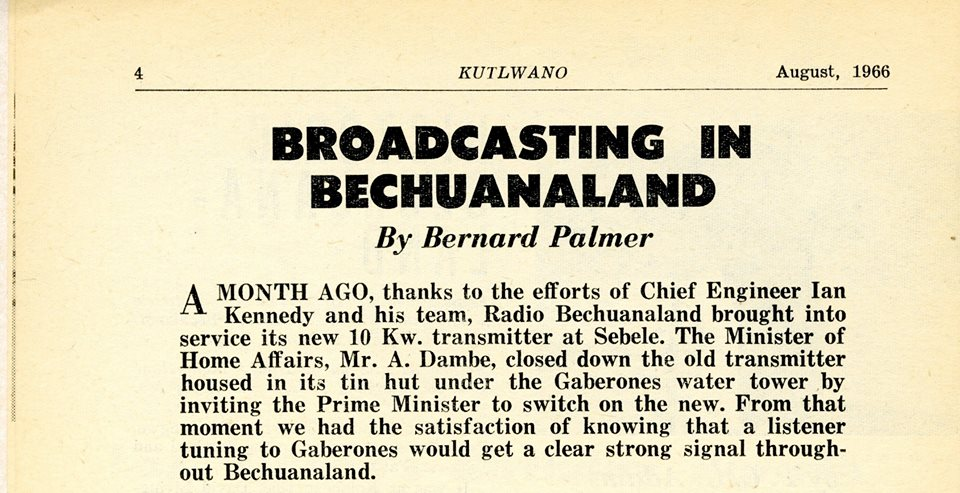
Quotation from Bernard Palmer

=== Frequencies ===
Lobatse:
Gaborone:
RB1- 89.9FM RB2- 103.00FM

Mahalapye:
Serowe:
Palapye:
Selibe Phikwe:
Francistown:
Maun:
