= T8AA (AM) =

Koror; Palau
- Frequency: 1584 kHz
- Branding: Voice of Palau; Ngerel Belau

Programming
- Languages: Palauan, English
- Format: News, Talk, Music

Ownership
- Owner: Government of Palau
- Sister stations: T8AA-FM

History
- Former call signs: WSZB
- Former frequencies: 1500kHz

Technical information
- Power: 5,000 watts

T8AA is a radio station on the island of Malakal in Palau. Its frequency is 1584 kHz and it transmits with 5,000 watts of power. It is licensed by the government of Palau, and it broadcasts news, public service announcements, talk shows, live coverage of major events, and music.

== History ==
T8AA Ngerel Belau started its AM broadcasting when they took over US army radio WSZB on with 250 watts on 1500 kHz in the 1970 era. After the independence of Palau, T8AA started broadcasting on 1584 kHz with a 5 kW transmitter which covered the whole nation.

T8AA Ngerel Belau went off air after the AM radio tower at Malakal collapsed during Typhoon Bopha late 2012 and was not replaced because of budget constraints.

In June 2022, T8AA Ngerel Belau returned on AM broadcast after the new AM transmitter installed and AM radio tower has been constructed with Japanese aid.
