= List of animated television series of 2000 =

A list of animated television series first aired in 2000.

Animated television series first aired in 2000
Title	Seasons	Episodes	Country	Year	Original channel	Technique
3-2-1 Penguins!	3	27	United States	2000–08	Direct-to-video; Qubo	CGI
Absolute Zero	2	36	United States	2000–01	Mondo Mini Shows; Getmusic.com	Flash
Action Man (2000)	2	26	Canada; United States	2000–01	Fox Kids; YTV	CGI
Aqua Teen Hunger Force	12	144	United States	2000–23	Cartoon Network (2000); Adult Swim (2001–23)	Flash (seasons 1–8); Traditional (seasons 9–12)
Argai: The Prophecy	1	26	France	2000	TF1	Traditional
As Told by Ginger	3	60	United States	2000–06	Nickelodeon (2000–04); Nicktoons (2004–06)	Traditional
Baby Blues	1	13	United States	2000–02	The WB (2000); Adult Swim (2002)	Traditional
The Baskervilles	2	26	United Kingdom; France; Canada	2000	Teletoon; France 2 ITV	Traditional
Belphégor	2	26	France; Belgium; Canada	2000	Canal Famille	Traditional
Between the Lions	10	130	United States	2000–10	PBS Kids	Traditional/Flash/CGI/Live action
Black Rubber Shoes	4	52	South Korea	2000–15	KBS2	Traditional
Block 13	3	45	Kuwait	2000–02	Kuwait Television	Flash
The Bob Clampett Show	2	26	United States	2000–01	Cartoon Network	Traditional
Buzz Lightyear of Star Command	1	65	United States	2000–01	ABC; UPN	Traditional
Chris Colorado	1	26	France	2000	France 3 Canal+	Traditional
The Christmas Calendar	1	24	France	2000	TF1	Flash
Clerks: The Animated Series	1	6	United States	2000–02	ABC	Flash/Traditional
Clifford the Big Red Dog (2000)	2	66	United States; United Kingdom	2000–03	PBS Kids; CBeebies	Traditional
Clover 4/3	1	24	South Korea	2000		Traditional
Corduroy	1	13	Canada; China	2000–01	TVOntario; PBS Kids	Traditional
Cubeez	2	104	United Kingdom	2000–01	ITV	CGI
D'Myna Leagues	2	26	Canada	2000–04	CTV	Traditional
Doc Eureka	1	39	France	2000	La Cinquième; France 3	Traditional
Dora the Explorer	8	177	United States	2000–19	Nickelodeon; Nick Jr.	Traditional
Dragon School		52	China	2000		Traditional
Eckhart	3	39	Canada; China (Hong Kong)	2000–02	Teletoon	Traditional
Elmo Aardvark: Outer Space Detective	1	25	United States	2000	Mondo Mini Shows	Flash
Exposure	1	13	United States	2000–02	Sci-Fi Channel	CGI
Fantômette	1	26	France	2000–01	France 3	Traditional
Fat Dog Mendoza	2	26	Germany; United Kingdom; United States	2000–01	Cartoon Network	Traditional
Feifei De Hangye	1	26	China	2000		Traditional
Fetch the Vet	2	26	United Kingdom	2000–01	ITV	Stop motion
Fix & Foxi and Friends	2	52	Germany; Australia (season 2); Spain	2000–02	KI.KA; Clan TVE; ABC	Traditional
Flight Squad	1	26	Canada; France	2000	Teletoon; M6	Traditional
For Better or For Worse	2	16	Canada	2000–01	Teletoon	Traditional
Fracto			Argentina	2000–02	Locomotion	CGI
Generation O!	1	13	United States	2000–01	Kids' WB	Traditional
George Shrinks	3	40	Canada; China	2000–03	TVOntario; Knowledge Network; Access; SCN; PBS Kids	Traditional
Ginger's Secrets			United Kingdom	2000	Channel 4	CGI
God, the Devil and Bob	1	13	United States	2000–11	NBC (2000); Adult Swim (2011)	Traditional
Grizzly Tales for Gruesome Kids	6	79	United Kingdom	2000–12	ITV (series 1–6); Nicktoons (series 7–8)	Traditional/Stop motion/Flash
Happy Tree Friends (2000)	6	94	United States	2000–present	Mondo Mini Shows/Mondo Media (2000–16); YouTube (2026–present)	Flash (seasons 1–5); Toon Boom (season 6 onwards)
Hard Drinkin' Lincoln	1	14	United States	2000	Icebox.com; Mondo Mini Shows	Flash
Heavy Metal Guy	1	6	United States	2000	Icebox.com; Mondo Mini Shows	Flash
Homestar Runner	1 (Toons, Shorts); 3 (Strong Bad)	21 (Toons); 68 (Shorts); 210 (Strong Bad)	United States	2000–present	HomestarRunner.com; YouTube	Flash
Hopla	4	198	Belgium	2000	Ketnet	CGI
House of Rock	2	25	United Kingdom	2000–02	Channel 4	Flash
J-Squad		300	Germany; Australia; Canada	2000	Junior	CGI
Jackie Chan Adventures	5	95	United States; Hong Kong	2000–05	Kids' WB	Traditional
Joe Paradise	1	24	United States	2000–01	Wildbrain.com	Flash
Julius and Friends	1	25	United States	2000–02	Mondo Mini Shows	Flash
King of Taekwondo Kang Taepoong	1	26	South Korea	2000	KBS2	Traditional
Kong: The Animated Series	2	40	France; Germany	2000–01	Fox Kids	Traditional
Lapitch the Little Shoemaker	1	26	Croatia	2000	Tiny Pop	Traditional
The Last Reservation	1	26	Spain; France	2000–2001	TF1	Traditional
Little Grey Rabbit	1	26	United Kingdom	2000	ITV	Traditional
Maggie and the Ferocious Beast	3	39	Canada	2000–02	Teletoon	Traditional
The Magic Key	1	26	United Kingdom	2000–01	BBC Two	Traditional
Marsupilami (2000)	5	130	France; Belgium; Canada (season 1); South Korea (season 1); Germany (seasons 3–5)	2000–12	France 3 (seasons 1–2); Canal J (seasons 1–2, 5); Disney Channel; ZDF (seasons 3–5)	Traditional
Marvellous Milly	1	26	Germany	2000–01		Traditional
Marvin the Tap-Dancing Horse	2	26	United States; Canada; China	2000–02	Teletoon; PBS Kids; CCTV3	Traditional
Matylda	3	33	Czech Republic	2000–06		Traditional
Max Steel (2000)	3	35	United States; Canada	2000–02	Kids' WB (2000–01); Cartoon Network (2001–02)	CGI
Meeow!	2	26	United Kingdom	2000	ITV	Traditional
A Miss Mallard Mystery	1	26	Canada; China	2000–01	Teletoon; OTV	Traditional
The New Adventures of Ocean Girl	1	26	Australia	2000	Network Ten	Traditional
Nick & Perry	2	52	France; Germany	2000–01	M6; KI.KA	Traditional
Norman Normal	3	65	Ireland; France; Germany	2000–03	France 3 Super RTL	Traditional
Ouch, Mama!		52	China	2000		Traditional
Papa Löwe und seine glücklichen Kinder	1	26	Germany	2000	Das Erste	Traditional
Pelswick	2	26	Canada; China	2000–02	CBC Television; Nickelodeon; CCTV	Traditional
Pettson and Findus	3	52	Germany; Sweden	2000–21	KI.KA	Traditional
Pigs Next Door	1	13	Germany; Ireland	2000	Fox Family	Traditional
Piki & Poko: Adventures in StarLand	1	36	United States	2000–01	Mondo Mini Shows	Flash
Playboy's Dark Justice	1	20	United States	2000–01	Playboy TV	CGI
Poker Night	1	10	United States	2000	Icebox.com; Mondo Mini Shows	Flash
Preston Pig	1	26	United Kingdom	2000	ITV	Traditional
Pumper Pups	1	13	Canada	2000	YTV	Traditional
Queer Duck	1	20	United States	2000–02	Icebox.com; Mondo Mini Shows; Showtime	Flash
Rainbow Fish	1	52	Canada; Germany; United States	2000	Teletoon; ZDF; HBO Family	Traditional
Sali Mali	1	13	United Kingdom (Wales)	2000	S4C	Traditional
Sammy	1	13	United States	2000	NBC	Traditional
Scruff	2	105	Spain	2000–04	Televisió de Catalunya; RTVE; ABC	Traditional
Sealab 2021	4	52	United States	2000–05	Cartoon Network (2000); Adult Swim (2001–05)	Flash
La Série du Peuple		4	Canada	2000	TVA	Traditional
Seven Little Monsters	3	40	United States; Canada; China (seasons 1–2); Philippines (season 3)	2000–03	Treehouse TV (seasons 1–2); YTV (season 3); PBS Kids	Traditional
Sheeep	2	26	United Kingdom	2000–01	CBBC	Traditional
Sheep in the Big City	2	26	United States	2000–02	Cartoon Network	Traditional
Spot's Musical Adventures	1	13	United Kingdom	2000		Traditional
Spy Groove	1	13	United States	2000–01	MTV	Flash
Static Shock	4	52	United States	2000–04	Kids' WB	Traditional
Teacher's Pet	2	39	United States	2000–02	ABC (2000–02); Toon Disney (2000)	Traditional
This Modern World	2	37	United States	2000–01	Mondo Mini Shows	Flash
Timothy Goes to School	2	26	Canada; Hong Kong	2000–02	TVOntario; Knowledge Network; Access; Saskatchewan Communications Network; PBS Kids	Traditional
Tommy & Oscar	2	52	Italy	2000–02	Rai Uno	Traditional
Track City	1	26	South Korea	2000	SBS	Traditional
Treasure	1	13	United Kingdom; Canada	2000–01	BBC2; YTV	Traditional
Troll Tales	1	26	Denmark; Germany	2000	DR1	Traditional
Turn off the Light!	4	210	Russia	2000–03	NTV; TNT; TV-6; TVS	CGI/Live action
The Twins	1	13	Canada	2000–01	YTV	Traditional
Uncle Gus		2	United States	2000–01	Cartoon Network	Traditional
Vampires, Pirates & Aliens	1	26	United Kingdom; France	2000	ITV	Traditional
The Weekenders	4	39	United States	2000–04	ABC (2000–01); UPN (2001); Toon Disney (2002–04)	Traditional
What About Mimi?	3	39	Canada	2000–02	Teletoon	Traditional
Wheel Squad	2	39	France; Italy; Australia	2000–02	M6; RAI	Traditional
White Heart Baekgu	1	13	South Korea	2000–01	SBS TV	Traditional
Wicked!	1	26	Australia; France; Germany	2000–01	Seven Network; TF1	Traditional
Wunschpunsch	2	52	France; Canada; Germany	2000–02	Fox Kids; TF1; Télévision de Radio-Canada; KI.KA	Traditional
X-Men: Evolution	4	52	United States	2000–03	Kids' WB	Traditional
Yinyue Chuan	1	26	China	2000		Traditional
Yoho Ahoy	2	39	United Kingdom	2000–01	CBBC	Stop motion
Yvon of the Yukon	3	52	Canada	2000–04	YTV	Traditional
Zombie College	1	13	United States	2000–01	Icebox.com; Mondo Mini Shows	Flash

Anime television series first aired in 2000
Title	Episodes	Country	Year	Original channel
Android Kikaider: The Animation	13	Japan	2000–01	
Argento Soma	25	Japan	2000–01	
Baby Felix	65	Japan	2000–01	JBC
Banner of the Stars	13	Japan	2000	
Boogiepop Phantom	12	Japan	2000	
Boys Be...	13	Japan	2000	
Brigadoon: Marin & Melan	26	Japan	2000–01	
Carried by the Wind: Tsukikage Ran	13	Japan	2000	
Ceres, Celestial Legend	24	Japan	2000	
Descendants of Darkness	13	Japan	2000	
Digimon Adventure 02	50	Japan	2000–01	
DinoZaurs: The Series	26	Japan	2000	
Doki Doki Densetsu Mahōjin Guru Guru	38	Japan	2000	
Dotto! Koni-chan	26	Japan	2000–01	
Gate Keepers	24	Japan	2000	
Gear Fighter Dendoh	38	Japan	2000–01	
Gensomaden Saiyuki	50	Japan	2000–01	
Ghost Stories	20	Japan	2000–01	
Gravitation	13	Japan	2000–01	
Hajime no Ippo	76	Japan	2000–02	
Hamtaro	296	Japan	2000–06	
Hand Maid May	10	Japan	2000	
Hidamari no Ki	25	Japan	2000	
Hiwou War Chronicles	26	Japan	2000–01	
Inuyasha	167	Japan	2000–04	
Invincible King Tri-Zenon	22	Japan	2000–01	
The Legend of the Gambler: Tetsuya	20	Japan	2000–01	
Love Hina	24	Japan	2000	
Medarot Damashii	39	Japan	2000–01	
Miami Guns	13	Japan	2000	
Mighty Cat Masked Niyander	83	Japan	2000–01	
Mon Colle Knights	51	Japan	2000	
NieA_7	13	Japan	2000	
OH! Super Milk Chan	12	Japan	2000	
Ojamajo Doremi #	49	Japan	2000–01	
Pilot Candidate	12	Japan	2000	
Platinumhugen Ordian	24	Japan	2000	
Popee the Performer	39	Japan	2000–03	
Sakura Wars	25	Japan	2000	
Sci-Fi Harry	20	Japan	2000–01	
Shin Megami Tensei: Devil Children	50	Japan	2000–01	
Shinzo	32	Japan	2000	
Strange Dawn	13	Japan	2000	
Taro the Space Alien	24	Japan	2000–01	
Time Bokan 2000: Kaitou Kiramekiman	26	Japan	2000	
Transformers: Robots in Disguise	39	Japan	2000	
UFO Baby	78	Japan	2000–02	
Vandread	13	Japan	2000	
Yu-Gi-Oh! Duel Monsters	224	Japan	2000–04	

== See also ==
- List of animated feature films of 2000
- List of Japanese animation television series of 2000
