= Shanghai People's Radio Station =

Radio station in Shanghai, China

Shanghai People's Radio Station (Chinese: 上海人民广播电台; pinyin: Shanghai Renmin Guangbo Diantai) was a radio station in Shanghai China. Since it was merged into Radio and Television Station of Shanghai in 2001, it has been a part of Radio and Television Station of Shanghai.

After the establishment of SMG Radio Centre, Shanghai People's Radio Station was divided and merged into different departments of the centre and only exist in callsigns.

== Channels ==
All Channels of Shanghai Media Group using callsigns with a prefix of "Shanghai People's Radio Station".

Frequency	Description
990 AM / FM 93.4	Shanghai News Radio (a.k.a. Shanghai People's Radio Station)
648 AM / FM 105.7	Shanghai Jiaotong Guangbo (Traffic Radio of Shanghai)
1296 AM / FM 90.9	Dong Guang Xinwen Tai (East Radio News Channel, created by former Shanghai People's Radio Station not East Radio Company)
792 AM / 89.9 FM	Dong Fang Dushi Guangbo (East Rido Metro FM, a.k.a. Driving FM)
101.7 FM	Popular Music (POP 101) (Mandopop)
103.7 FM	Love Music
94.7 FM	Classical Music (Classical 947)
97.7 FM	Economic/Business News (CBN)
107.2 FM	Story Channel (The Story Broadcast of Shanghai)
1197 AM / FM 97.2	Marine Channel
94.0 FM	Sports News (The Five-Star Sport News Channel)
98.1 FM	Western Pop Music (KFM 981)
