= Yicai =

Yicai may refer to:

- Yicai, Prince Qing (1820−1866), prince of the Qing dynasty
- Yicai Media Group, or China Business Network, a Chinese media company
