= Global Business News =

Chinese television program

- Title card since 2014
- Also known as: 环球第一财经 (in Mandarin)
- Genre: business news
- Presented by: Yin Fan (2012–); Liu Ye (2012–,seasoned anchor)
- Country of origin: China
- Original language: Mandarin

Production
- Producer: Yin Fan
- Production locations: CBN Studio; Shanghai, China
- Running time: 20 minutes (weekdays)
- Production company: Shanghai Media Group

Original release
- Network: Ningxia Satellite Television(2012–2013); China Business Network (2013–present)
- Release: January 2, 2012 – present

Global Business News (Chinese: 环球第一财经) is a daily evening television business news program that airs on China Business Network. The program debuted on January 2, 2012.

It is broadcast live from Shanghai, China's financial centre, every weekday from 9:37 p.m.to 9:57 p.m. and covers the latest stories of the Chinese economy and global markets, making use of China Business Network's many TV journalists and correspondents. The presenters are Ms. Liu Ye and Mr. Yin Fan, who also produces the programme.

== Hosts ==
=== Current anchors ===
- Yin Fan (2012–present)
- Liu Ye (2012–present)

=== Yin Fan ===
Before taking on the responsibility of producing and anchoring Global Business News, Mr. Yin Fan has worked as a senior TV reporter form CBN for almost 10 years, covering the most important national and international events such as G20 summit, G8 Summit and Davos Forum.

Mr. Yin has also interviewed over 50 people with substantial global business and political influence including John W. Snow, Treasury Secretary of the United States.

Yin Fan graduated from Fudan University with a master's degree in 2001. From 2009-2010, he was selected by the UK Government and entitled as a prestigious Chevening Scholarship. He studied at the University of Liverpool and got his Master’s in Business Administration.

=== Liu Ye ===
Liu Ye is the anchor of Global Business News, and the host of Biz talk with Ye, a talk show with topics on policies and statistics related to Chinese economy.

Before joining CBN, Ye worked for China Central Television, and Phoenix North America Chinese Channel. Ye has hosted a number of TV shows, most of them focus on bridging eastern and western views by introducing western culture into China, and vice versa.

In 2010, Ye became the first Chinese TV celebrity to be invited to host the 38th America Music Award red carpet live show.

Ye graduated from the Communication University of China with a bachelor's degree in Broadcasting in 2006. From 2009-2011, Ye studied Business Journalism and TV &Film Production at Boston University, with a scholarship of Asia Journalism Elit.

== See also ==
- Shanghai Media Group
- China Business Network
