= List of animated television series of the 2000s =

Lists of animated television series first aired in the 2000s organized by year:

- List of animated television series of 2000
- List of animated television series of 2001
- List of animated television series of 2002
- List of animated television series of 2003
- List of animated television series of 2004
- List of animated television series of 2005
- List of animated television series of 2006
- List of animated television series of 2007
- List of animated television series of 2008
- List of animated television series of 2009
