= Dong Guang Xinwen Tai =

Radio station in Shanghai, China

Dong Guang Xinwen Tai (Chinese: 东广新闻台; pinyin: dōngguǎng xīnwén tái; IPA: [tʊ́ŋkwàŋ ɕínwə̌n tʰǎɪ]), whose full callsign is Dong Guang News Radio of Shanghai People's Radio Station (上海人民广播电台东广新闻资讯广播; shànghǎi rénmín guǎngbò diàntái dōngguǎng xīnwén zīxùn guǎngbò; [ʂâŋxàɪ ɻə̌nmǐn kwàŋpwô tjɛ̂ntʰǎɪ tʊ́ŋkwàŋ ɕínwə̌n tsɹ̩́ɕŷn kwàŋpwô]), is a news radio channel in Shanghai in the People's Republic of China, broadcasting at both 90.9 FM and 1296 AM.

The radio channel was founded by Shanghai People's Radio Station in 2007, and is part of the Shanghai Media Group, affiliated to SMG Radio Centre.

"Dong Guang" (东广) is also the name of the former unrelated Shanghai East Radio Company.
