= Dragon Television =

Television channel in Shanghai, China

- Country: People's Republic of China
- Broadcast area: National (China); International (Includings; Canada; United States)
- Headquarters: Shanghai

Programming
- Picture format: 1080i (HDTV)

Ownership
- Owner: Shanghai Media Group

History
- Launched: October 1, 1998 (as Shanghai Television)

Availability

Streaming media
- Sling TV: Internet Protocol television

Shanghai Dragon Television or Dragon TV (Chinese: 东方卫视; pinyin: Dōngfāng Wèishì; lit. 'Eastern satellite channel'), commonly nicknamed the Tomato Channel (蕃茄台) based on its logo, is a provincial satellite TV station, operated by Shanghai Media Group (SMG) It launched in October 1998 as "Shanghai Television" but changed its name to Dragon Television on October 23, 2003. Currently, Dragon TV's signal covers most of Mainland China and worldwide. From September 28, 2009, the channel used standard high-definition broadcast.

== History ==
All of Dragon TV's news programs are owned by the parent company SMG TV news production center. The center has a professional staff of 500 people a day, 7 sections provided for the Dragon TV news programs which amounts a total of five hours. It is Asia's largest open-press studio and the largest television news production and broadcasting of news organizations.

News programs include Morning (看东方), Dragon TV News Midday (午间30分), Primetime News (东方新闻) and Tonight (今晚).
