= Kiangnan 1894 =

2019 Chinese film

- 江南
- Produced by: SMG Pictures, Shanghai Zhongchuan Culture Media Co.
- Release date: 27 September 2019
- Country: China
- Language: Chinese

Kiangnan 1894 (Chinese title: 江南) is a 2019 Chinese animated film co-produced by SMG Pictures and Shanghai Zhongchuan Culture Media Co. It was scheduled released on September 27, 2019, and set in Shanghai during the late Qing dynasty. The theme song debuted at the CCG Expo 2019 in Shanghai in July.

== Plot ==
The plot revolves around a teenager named A'lang, who accidentally becomes an apprentice in the Jiangnan Manufacturing Factory before becoming a top military mechanic.

== Production ==
The creative production of the movie was supported by Jiangnan Shipyard (Group) Co Ltd and its parent company China State Shipbuilding Corporation Limited, which was formerly Jiangnan Manufacturing Factory.

== Promotion ==
As part of the promotion of this film, idol group BEJ48 recorded the theme song for this film.
