= Shanghai News Radio =

Shanghai News Radio 上海新闻广播
Shanghai municipality; China
- Broadcast area: Shanghai municipality
- Frequencies: 93.4 MHz; 990 kHz
- Branding: 欲知天下事，请听990 (Listen to 990 AM, Know everything)

Programming
- Format: News/talk (Public)

Ownership
- Owner: Shanghai Media Group

History
- First air date: May 27, 1949

Technical information
- Power: 10,000 watts (FM 93.4 MHz); 100,000 watts (AM 990 KHz)

Links
- Webcast: Listen live
- Website: www.smg.cn/review/channel/channel_15/index.html

Shanghai News Radio (Chinese: 上海新闻广播; pinyin: Shanghai Xinwen Guangbo [ʂaŋ xaj ɕin wən kwaŋ pwɔ]), which is also known as Shanghai People's Radio Station (Chinese: 上海人民广播电台), is a news radio channel in Shanghai China, broadcasting at 990 AM and 93.4 FM, now owned by Shanghai Media Group and operated by SMG Radio Centre.

Its callsign, Shanghai People's Radio Station, and its frequencies, 990 AM and 93.4 FM, were inherited from former Shanghai People's Radio Station.
