= List of Vandread episodes =

This is an episode list from the Japanese anime television series Vandread. The series is composed of two seasons (Vandread, released in 2000 and Vandread: The Second Stage, released in 2001), each composed of thirteen episodes. The first series is summarized in the Vandread Taidouhen OVA of 2001, and the second in the Vandread Gekitouhen ("Turbulence") OVA, released in 2002. There is a novel, Vandread Extra Stage, that explains the events after the last episode (#13 Trust), containing five short stories.

== Episodes ==
=== Season 1 (2000) ===
No.	Title	Original release date
1	"Boy Meets Girl"; Transliteration: "Bōi Mītsu Gāru" (Japanese: ボーイ・ミーツ・ガール)	October 3, 2000
The male planet of Tarak commemorates the launch of a new battleship, Ikazuchi. Hibiki attempts to steal a vanguard on board the ship but is captured. A female pirate raids the ship and ends up capturing Hibiki, along with Bart, Duero, and half the ship.
2	"And... I've Lost My Way"; Transliteration: "Soshite boku wa tohō ni kureru" (Japanese: そして僕は途方にくれる)	October 10, 2000
The abandoned portion of Ikazuchi and the female pirate ship merge by crystalization. An unknown enemy attacks the combined ship.
3	"This Is The Path I Choose To Live"; Transliteration: "Kore ga watashi no ikiru michi" (Japanese: これが私の生きる道)	October 17, 2000
The female crew assesses the condition of the ship. BC finds uses for the men and assigns them for their eventually permanent roles. By order of Magno Vivan, the men become part of the crew. Ezra announces her pregnancy.
4	"I Want To Know More About You"; Transliteration: "Motto anata o shiritakute" (Japanese: もっとあなたを知りたくて)	October 24, 2000
Hibiki's arrogance and recklessness conflicts with Meia. On a sortie, Hibiki's vangard merges with Meia's dread for the first time. After defeating the enemy, they acknowledge the importance of working together.
5	"Sweet Temptation"; Transliteration: "Amai wana" (Japanese: 甘いワナ)	October 31, 2000
An away team is sent to explore a desert planet in vangards. The crew learned the intent of the robotic enemy.
6	"What a Wonderful World"	November 7, 2000
Meia is gravely injured in a battle against the enemy. Meia's past is shown with her memories and Magno's account. The battle continued on.
7	"Easy Life"	November 14, 2000
Hibiki's reaction to Dita's kindness turns into a misunderstanding, where the two separate themselves until they sort out their emotions.
8	"Impossible!"; Transliteration: "Murida!" (Japanese: 無理だ！)	November 21, 2000
The crew loot an old abandoned space colony. There, they encounter Rabat. After a battle with the colony's defenses and its destruction, a distrusted Rabat temporarily stays on board the Nirvana.
9	"More Barbaric Than Heaven"; Transliteration: "Tengoku yori yaban" (Japanese: 天国より野蛮)	November 28, 2000
The Nirvana encounters an enemy orbiting the water planet, Anpathos. Jura's dread combines with Hibiki's vangard. On the planet, the crew finds a solitary religious colony contempt with arrival of a god, Munya, which turns out to be a Harvest machine.
10	"White Love"	December 5, 2000
The crew celebrate Christmas, while tracking a nearby comet of ice. The men learn of this holiday and adjust accordingly.
11	"Together..."; Transliteration: "Issho ni..." (Japanese: 一緒に…)	December 12, 2000
Some women revert to negative opinions towards men and detains them. After escaping in his vanguard, Hibiki finds a fleet of ships with humans escaping the Harvest. In battle, he witnesses the death of humans for the first time.
12	"They Don't Care About Us"	December 19, 2000
Rabat returns Hibiki to the Nirvana. The women attempt to fight the enemy without the help of men, but later release them for their help.
13	"To Feel The Fire"	December 19, 2000
The crew of the Nirvana ignite a star to destroy the enemy flagship. However, they soon learn that this event has attracted another five harvester flagships from Earth.

=== Season 2 (2001) ===
No.	Title	Original release date
14	"Red Angel"	October 5, 2001
Hibiki, Dita, Meia, and Jura had the same Dread dreams about a red light that destroyed Nirvana. A pod emits a rescue signal and the Nirvana intercepts. Upon pod retrieval, an enemy attacks and emits the same red light from the dream. Within the pod, the crew finds Misty Cornwell.
15	"Be My Baby"	October 12, 2001
Misty and her pod carried an old message from Earth. BC uses Pyoro to decrypt the message and the Nirvana becomes disabled by a computer virus. During an attack, Ezra delivers her baby with the aid of Hibiki, Dita, and communication with Magno and Duero. The sound of Ezra's baby cracks the virus's password, restores ship control, and unlocks the message containing information on the Harvesters and human colonization.
16	"Blossoming Path"; Transliteration: "Hana saku tabiji" (Japanese: 花咲く旅路)	October 19, 2001
While the Nirvana crew gives aid to a dismal planet, whose inhabitants are contaminated by the planet since birth; and Bart becomes attached to a terminally ill girl. A Harvester ship arrives; and Bart's motivation unleashes one of Nirvana's destructive weapons.
17	"Everything"	October 26, 2001
The Nirvana docks with an outpost for supplies and rest. Inside, an away team faces a rough crowd of Harvester refugees. BC faces a one-on-one melee combat with the group leader. An outpost familiar Rabat settles the fight, just before a Harvester force infiltrates the facility.
18	"Somedays"	November 2, 2001
The Nirvana encounters a Harvester mothership. In light of the fight, Gascogne recollects memories of her lost sister.
19	"Original Smile"; Transliteration: "Orijinaru Sumairu" (Japanese: オリジナル・スマイル)	November 9, 2001
The crew mourns for Gascogne, who was lost assaulting the Harvester mothership. The mothership is infiltrated in order to use Pyoro and the Earth message virus. A new combination of all three dreads emerges.
20	"Kiss On My Cheek"; Transliteration: "Hoho ni kisushite" (Japanese: 頬にキスして)	November 16, 2001
A water leak floods the men's quarters. Misty and Dita compete over Hibiki. Like a soap opera, the rest of the crew monitors their love triangle. Eventually, Jura forces Dita and Hibiki to reconcile. Meia, on the other hand, consoles Misty.
21	"Reality"	November 30, 2001
Crew members with Hibiki plan Meia's birthday surprise. An aware Meia remains stoic. Since Meia had always escaped the crew's plans to arrange a surprise party for the past years she has been with the pirates, Hibiki and the others try to stop Meia from escaping again by learning from Meia's past attempts to run away. Just as she was going to talk to BC. Dita, Hibiki, and Pieway arranges her to babysit Ezra's baby. During an enemy attack, Meia accidentally ejects in an escape pod with the baby.
22	"Embrace All"; Transliteration: "Zenbu dakishimete" (Japanese: 全部抱きしめて)	December 7, 2001
Battling in a visually dense asteroid field, Hibiki gets separated during combat and is found by a people similar to Native Americans with the ability to communicate telepathically. Hibiki is revealed to belong to the first generation colonists. During his stay, Hibiki faces a warrior's ritual trial.
23	"Easy Come, Easy Go"	December 14, 2001
The Nirvana is close to Mejere and the crew celebrates; yet Misty remains lonesome. Upon arrival, the Taraak defense network is activated; and BC provides an access code. In doing so, her real identity is revealed.
24	"Paradise"; Transliteration: "Rakuen" (Japanese: 楽園)	December 21, 2001
Fleets from both Taraak and Mejere demand Nirvana's surrender. The Nirvana is captured, and its crew detained. Quickly after a series of escapes, the Nirvana crew is reassembled on board their own ship with the addition of pirates left on Mejere.
25	"Secret" (Japanese: himegoto)	January 11, 2002
First generation leaders convene. Magno joins the discussion, and Hibiki addresses both planets to fight the Harvesters. Fleets from Taraak, Mejere, and Melanos assemble alongside the Nirvana. In addition, humans associated with Rabat and Gascogne with a Harvester mothership join. The last battle begins against a very large Harvester fleet.
26	"Trust"	January 18, 2002
The final battle against the Harvesters concludes. Leaders agree on the coexistence of genders between Taraak and Mejere.
