= Shanghai Media Group =

State-owned broadcaster in Shanghai, China

Radio and Television Station of Shanghai Shanghai Media Group 上海广播电视台、上海文化广播影视集团有限公司
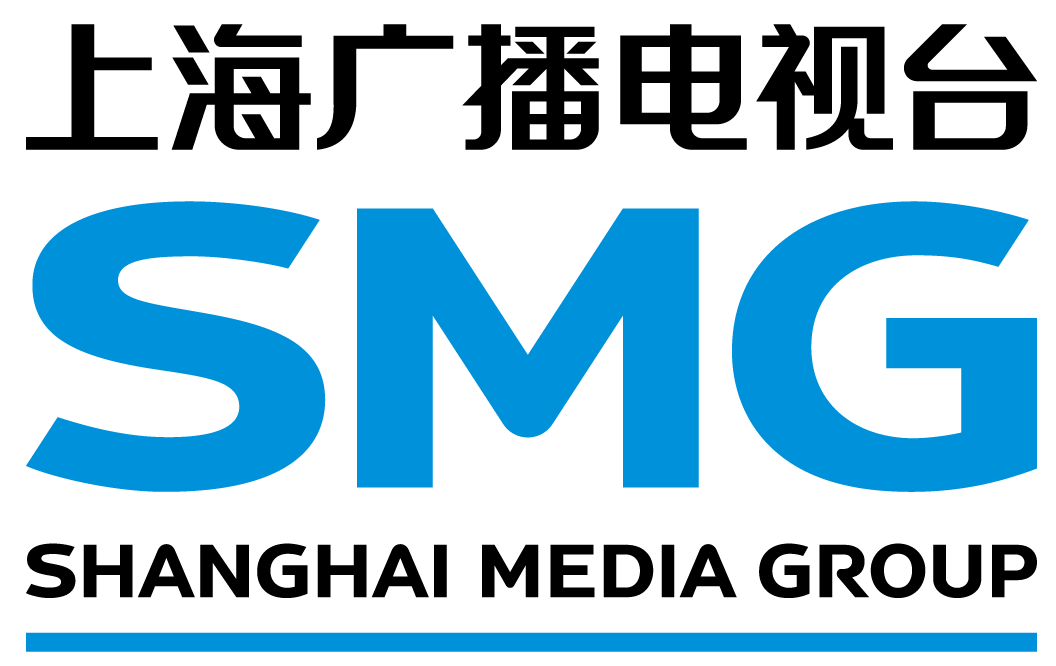
- Current logo since 2024 (Current SMG logo design since 2014)
- Type: State media
- Country: People's Republic of China
- Motto: Spread upward power and enrich people's lives (传播向上力量，丰富大众生活)
- Headquarters: Shanghai
- Launch date: 2001; 25 years ago
- Official website: www.smg.cn

Shanghai Media Group
- Simplified Chinese: 上海文化广播影视集团有限公司
- Traditional Chinese: 上海文化廣播影視集團有限公司
Transcriptions
Standard Mandarin
- Hanyu Pinyin: Shànghǎi Wenhua Guangbo Yingshi Jituan Youxian Gongsi
Yue: Cantonese
- Jyutping: Soeng^{6}hoi2 Dung^{1}fong^{1} Cyun^{4}mui^{4}k 8 Zaap^{6}tyun^{4}

Alternative Chinese name
- Simplified Chinese: 上海广播电视台
- Traditional Chinese: 上海廣播電視台
- Literal meaning: Radio and Television Station of Shanghai
Transcriptions
Standard Mandarin
- Hanyu Pinyin: Shànghǎi Guangbo Diànshìtái

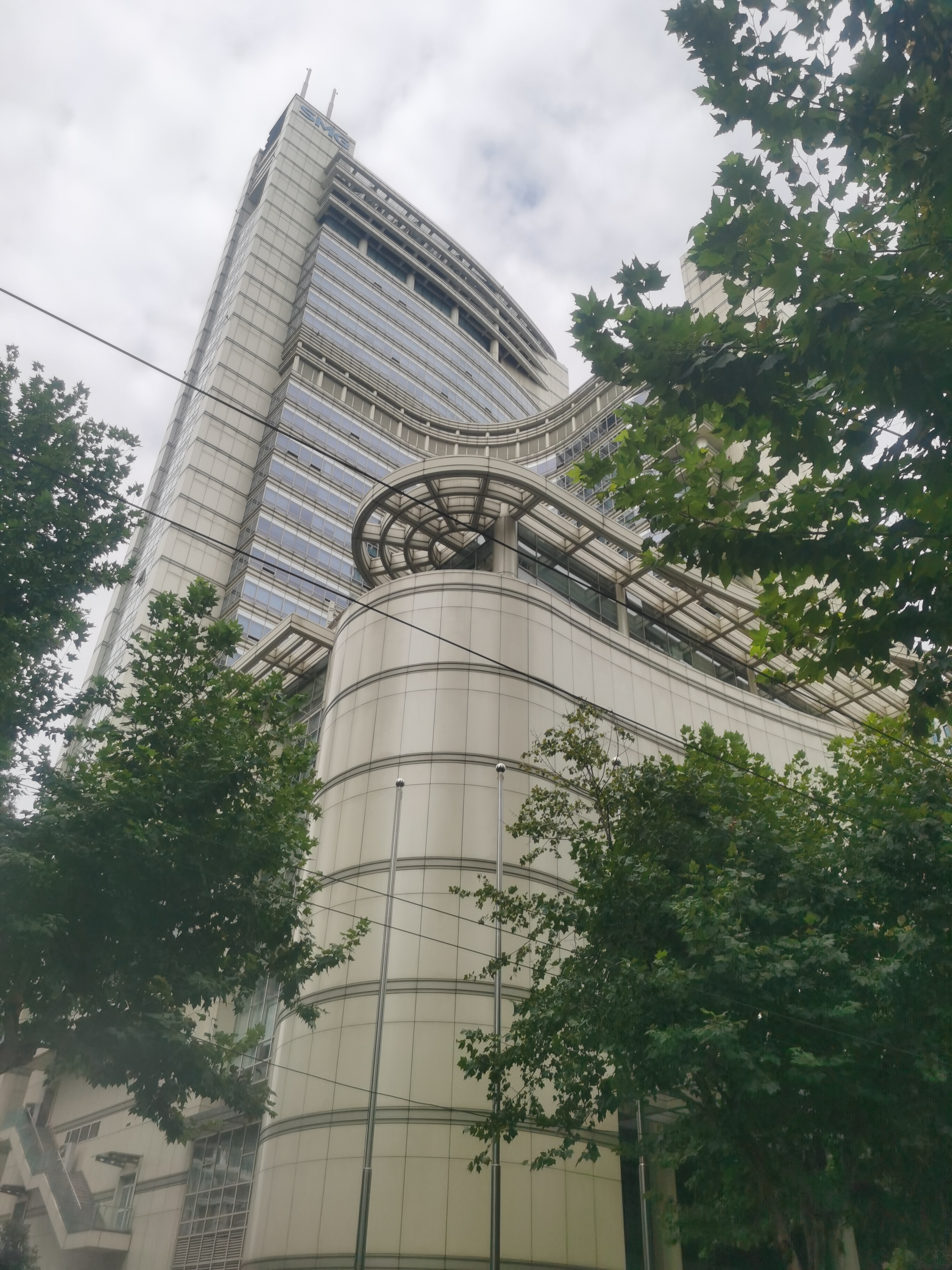
Headquarters of Shanghai Media Group

Radio and Television Station of Shanghai (RTS), a Shanghai-based state media outlet, and its wholly owned subsidiary, Shanghai Media Group (SMG), represent one of the largest state-owned media conglomerates of the People's Republic of China, with the most complete portfolio of media and related businesses.

== History ==
Formed in 2001, SMG is the result of a merger between the People's Radio Station of Shanghai, East Radio Shanghai, Shanghai Television, and Oriental Television. In 2003 the group conducted a feasibility study with a view to set up a new English channel. It renamed its Shanghai Broadcasting Network to Dragon TV and moved that channel's best-known English program "News at Ten" to Shanghai Television Business Channel and Dragon TV. In January 2008, the Group launch a 24-hour English TV news channel, (ICS – International Channel Shanghai), the second in China after the state-owned China Central Television's English channel (CCTV-9). The content of ICS News is distributed on mobile and internet platforms by US Company China Animation Partners, LLC.

English radio programming includes "Live It Up, Shanghai" broadcasts on the East Radio channel (792am and 89.9fm).

On 2 October the Group hosted special concert to mark the 20th anniversary of South Korea and China's diplomatic ties, with performers including along Kim Jang-hoon, Super Junior-M and EXO-K.

The Walt Disney Studios and Shanghai Media Group Pictures signed a movie development agreement, before 6 March 2014 announcement, in which Chinese themes would be incorporated into Disney branded movies.

Shanghai Media Group is the holding company of Yicai Media Group (formerly known as China Business Network), which in addition to a TV channel also runs a magazine named CBN Weekly, a newspaper called CBN Paper, radio channel CBN Radio and a number of websites carrying the name. In 2015, Alibaba Group paid 1.2 billion yuan ($193.5 million) to Shanghai Media Group for 30% of CBN's stocks. In October 2020, the United States Department of State designated the Yicai Global subsidiary as a foreign mission of the Chinese government.

== Television channels ==
=== Free channels ===
Channel	Channel content	Launch Date
Dragon TV	main commercial terrestrial channel Free-to-air in Shanghai only formerly known as Shanghai Television	23 October 2003; 1 October 1998 (Shanghai Television)
STV	general and news channel	1 October 1958
Yicai	financial news channel formerly known as Shanghai Television Economy	1 August 2003
City TV	entertainment channel formerly known as Shanghai Television Lifestyle and Fashion formerly known as Oriental Television	1 January 2019
Oriental Film	films, TV show series, and their relative informations	26 December 1992
Great Sports	sports channel formerly known as Shanghai Television Sports	8 October 2001
Oriental Shopping	Infomercial channels	1 January 2008
Toonmax	children animation channel	1 January 2019
Oriental Pearl Mobile Television	information channel specific used for metros, buses and outdoor LED panels	27 February 1994

=== Pay channels ===
Channel	Channel content	Launch Date
Golden Class	learning platform for old peoples (de facto free channel in Shanghai since 1 March 2021)||18 June 2021	
Seven-color Opera	Opera contents in Jiangsu, Shanghai and Zhejiang (de facto free channel in Shanghai)	
Oriental Financial	financial comments (known as Oriental Financial-Pudong)	
World of the Law	legality contents	
New vision	sports records, mainly football contents	
UUSee Sports	sports informations	
Fascination Football	football matches	21 March 2020
Happy color	lottery, CFA Super League	1 September 2010
SiTV max	automobile informations	
Full Documentary	documentary channel	
Animation Show	animation contents	
Urban Theater	TV series	
Laugh Theater	films, arts, documentary and sports informations	
Lifestyle	international fashion contents	
Gamefy	video games live and e-sport events	December 2004

== Radio stations ==
All Channels are using callsigns with a prefix of "Shanghai People's Radio Station"(Chinese: 上海人民广播电台), but most programmes of them has been produced by of SMG Radio Centre (Chinese: 东方广播中心) (a.k.a. Shanghai East Radio Company Limited, Chinese: 上海东方广播有限公司) since 2014.

Frequency	Description
990 AM / FM 93.4	Shanghai News Radio (Former Shanghai People's Radio Station)
648 AM / FM 105.7	Shanghai Jiaotong Guangbo (Traffic Radio of Shanghai)
1296 AM / FM 90.9	Dong Guang Xinwen Tai (Created by former Shanghai People's Radio Station, not East Radio Company)
792 AM / 89.9 FM	Dong Fang Dushi Guangbo (Driving FM)
101.7 FM	Popular Music (POP 101) (Mandopop)
103.7 FM	Love Music
94.7 FM	Classical 94.7
97.7 FM	Economic/Business News (Diyi Caijing a.k.a. CBN)
107.2 FM	Story Channel (The Story Broadcast of Shanghai)
1197 AM / FM 97.2	Marine Channel
94.0 FM	Sports News (The Five-Star Sport News Channel)
98.1 FM	Western Pop Music (KFM 981)

== Programmes ==
- Dwelling Narrowness
- Global Business News
- We Got Married – a special Valentine's Day Chinese version

== Films ==
- Flying Swords of Dragon Gate (2011)
- Last Flight (2014)
- Kung Fu Panda 3 (2016)
- Born in China (2016) Along with Disneynature
- Earth: One Amazing Day (2017)
- 21 Carats (2018)
- Kiangnan 1894 (2019)
