= Dong Fang Dushi Guangbo =

Radio station in Shanghai, China

Dong Fang Dushi Guangbo (Chinese: 东方都市广播; pinyin: Dōngfāng dūshì guǎngbò), whose full callsign is East City Radio of Shanghai People's Radio Station (Chinese: 上海人民广播电台东方都市广播; pinyin: Shànghǎi rénmín guǎngbò diàntái dōngfāng dūshì guǎngbò), also known as FM 899 Driving FM (Chinese: 八九九驾车调频; pinyin: Bājiǔjiǔ jiàchē tiáopín), is a city affairs radio station in Shanghai in the People's Republic of China, broadcasting at both 792 AM and 89.9 FM.

Its former callsign, Dong Fang Guangbo Dian Tai (Chinese: 东方广播电台 (dong fang guang bo dian tai) [tʊŋ faŋ kwaŋ pwɔ tjɛn tʰaj], literally "East Radio Station"), refers to the former Shanghai East Radio Company. And its frequencies, 792 AM and 89.9 FM, were inherited from former Shanghai East Radio Company too.

The radio station is now operated by SMG Radio Centre, which is a part of the Shanghai Media Group.
