= Yicai Media Group =

Chinese media company

- Founded: 2003
- Headquarters: Shanghai, {{{location_country}}}
- Owner: Shanghai Media Group
- Key people: Li Rong (CEO)
- Industry: Mass media

Yicai Media Group (Chinese: 第一财经), also known as China Business Network (CBN), is a Chinese financial media company and subsidiary of the state-affiliated Shanghai Media Group. It is considered one of the most influential business media outlets in China. The current CEO is Li Rong.

== History ==
Yicai Media Group was founded in 2003 by incorporating Shanghai Television Finance Channel and Shanghai Oriental Radio Finance Channel.

In 2015, Alibaba Group paid 1.2 billion yuan ($193.5 million) to Shanghai Media Group for 30% of Yicai Media Group's stocks.

In 2016, Yicai Media Group launched a subsidiary targeting international audiences, Yicai Global. In October 2020, the United States Department of State designated Yicai Global as a foreign mission of the Chinese government alongside other Chinese state media.

== Subsidiaries ==
Yicai Media Group comprises the following subsidiaries:

=== Television and radio ===
- Yicai Television
- Yicai Radio
- Oriental Finance Pudong Channel

=== Publications ===
- Yicai Daily (China Business News)
- YiMagazine (formerly Yicai Weekly)

=== International ===
- Yicai Global

Yicai Media Group also includes the Yicai news website and app, and four research institutions.

== Content ==
Yicai Media Group's Rising Lab research institution publishes a widely read tier list of Chinese cities for commercial appeal.

== Notable journalists ==
- Liang Xiangyi, the reporter in the 2018 Liang Xiangyi eye-rolling incident.

== See also ==
- List of newspapers in China
