= List of Ceres, Celestial Legend episodes =

First of two Ceres, M Celestial Legend, Collector's Edition DVD sets; released by Viz Media on 16 September 2003

This is a complete episode listing for the anime series Ceres, Celestial Legend. Directed by Hajime Kamegaki and produced by Studio Pierrot, the twenty-four-episode series is based on the fourteen volume manga series written and illustrated by Yuu Watase. In Ceres, Celestial Legend, Aya Mikage finds her world turned upside on her 16th birthday, when her family suddenly tries to kill her, her twin brother is taken away, and her father is killed. Aya learns she is the reincarnation of Ceres, a celestial maiden seeking her celestial robe (羽衣, hagoromo) and revenge on the Mikage for keeping her trapped in this world for so many centuries. As Aya seeks the robe, another branch of the Mikage family pursues her to capture Ceres for their own gain. The series premiered in Japan on WOWOW on 20 April 2000 and concluded on 28 September 2000. It was released to VHS videotape and DVD by Bandai Visual in twelve volumes, with each volume containing two episodes.

Ceres, Celestial Legend is licensed for Region 1 release by Viz Media, which also owns the North American license for the source manga. Viz released the series to VHS and DVD in eight three-episode volumes, with the first volume released on 24 July 2001. The VHS editions were dubbed in English, while the DVD volumes offered a choice between the dubbed English audio track and the original Japanese audio, with optional English subtitles. The DVD versions also offers extra features, including art galleries, character profiles, and interviews with Yu Watase. In 2003, Viz re-released the series in two volume collector's edition sets that contained twelve episodes on two disc, and all of the on-disc extras from the earlier releases. The English dubbed version of the series were broadcast in Southeast Asia by AXN-Asia.

Four pieces of theme music are used in the series. The opening theme, "Scarlet" is performed by Junko Iwao and used to open all twenty-four episodes. A remixed version of the song is also used as the closing theme for the final episode. For the first fifteen episodes, the song "One ~ Kono Yo ga Hatete mo Hanarenai" is used for the ending theme, while episodes sixteen through twenty-three use "Cross My Heart". Both songs are performed by Day-break.

== Episodes ==
No.	Title	Original release date
1	"The Day the Moon and the Sixteen Stars Align"; Transliteration: "Jyuuroku no Hoshi to Tsuki ga Meguru Nichi" (Japanese: 16の星と月が巡る日)	20 April 2000
In a flashback scene, an elderly man tells his young grand-daughter the story of a celestial maiden who had her celestial robe dubbed the Hagoromo stolen from a man that she fell in love with and eventually married; the next scene shows a teenage girl visiting a fortune-teller who tells her that there is negative energy and that she will soon be taken over by an evil presence and that her true powers will awaken. In the present day, Fraternal twins Aya and Aki Mikage are shown hanging out at a karaoke bar in Shibuya with three of their classmates from school. While there, they brush off the fortune tellers readings as made up jokes and tease each other about it, while Aki notes that the fortune teller had also mentioned that someone is fated to rescue Aya. Later on, the five teenagers leave the bar and start making plans to go to another one to celebrate Aya and Aki's upcoming sixteenth birthday. As they are all crossing a bridge, they see a man ahead of the other side stealing a woman's purse and run towards their side. Aya runs after and tackles the man, knocking the purse out of his hand. She then tries to catch the purse, inadvertently jumping over the side of the bridge. As she falls towards the busy street below, she finds her mind filled with strange images, including a symbol she has never seen before. She stops falling and begins floating instead, landing gently on her feet on the road. A red-haired stranger saves Aya from an oncoming car, once he rescues her, he asks Aya if she's okay, but then disappears before she can have the chance to thank him. Afterwards, Aki reprimands Aya for being so careless. That night when they return home, Aya and Aki are told by their father to come straight home after school instead of hanging out with their friends as they had planned, telling them that they will be having their birthday at their grandfather's place instead, the twins are extremely hesitant and refuse to go telling them about their current plans which their father refuses until they are ordered by their mother to do as they were told. The next day, Aya and Aki break to their friends about canceling their party plans which they understand and they leave school as ordered by their parents. The siblings head to their grandfather's mansion to celebrate their birthday. They are surprised to find that many of their relatives are there for the party, but none of seem happy and are all wearing funeral-like clothes, Aya also sees the same red-haired man from the day before, handing over an unknown item to one of the guards. While attending the meeting, they are given a single present, a wrapped box. As she unwraps it, Aya becomes increasingly uneasy. Aki volunteers to open the box instead. Inside is a black mummified hand. Aya experiences another blur of strange visions, her school shirt sleeves rip, and for a moment her eyes change from bright blue to deep gold. She sends out an incredibly strong and powerful burst of highly destructive power that destroys the hand, then returns back to normal. Confused, she turns to Aki to ask what happened, but Aki is shown writhing in pain as cuts begin appearing all over his body. Aya screams to her family to help before he dies, but no one moves. Her grandfather tells her the marks are a sign that Aki is the rightful heir of the Mikage and that he will be fine, but that she on the other hand must now die.
2	"The Angel's First Kiss"; Transliteration: "Tennyo no Fāsuto Kisu" (Japanese: 天女のファーストキス)	27 April 2000
Aki is taken away and the other Mikage family members leave the room, with Aya's father and grandfather staying behind with the armed guards. Aya's father is given a gun to kill her with. As he points it at her, his eyes fill with tears and he apologizes, and tells her not to let the Mikage's control her but to find her own life. He turns around and points the gun at his father instead, but a guard also points a gun at him and Aya's grandfather orders the guard to shoot him. The guard complies and kills Aya's father in front of her, then he and the other guards point guns at Aya. Shocked by her father's death, Aya has remained speechless, but her eyes change color and suddenly the house explodes. In another part of the city, a woman named Suzumi Aogiri calls to her brother Yuhi to go with her to pick up a "certain girl" and they speed to the Mikage's main house. Aya regains consciousness on a tree, unable to remember how she got there. She recalls about her time that she climbed up the same tree as a child as Aki was warning her to descend from there since their grandfather would get angry at them, she suddenly lost her grip and nearly fell out of the tree until their father catches her in the nick of time. The young man who saved her the day before appears at the bottom, asking why the family wants to kill her. Aya begins to cry, remembering her father. Surprised to find the man suddenly beside her on the tree, Aya panics and nearly falls but he catches her before she could fall any further. She starts to freak out remembering what happened, but suddenly the man kisses her, to silence her as guards appear below. The guards leave and the man introduces himself as Toya, a name meaning "ten nights." More guards appear below, but Yuhi arrives to knock them out. He calls to Aya to jump down. When she hesitates, Toya pushes her out of the tree. As she falls, she begins floating again, which causes her to land safely in Yuhi's arms. Yuhi quickly pulls her into a run towards the waiting car. As they flee, Aya looks back at Toya still watching her from the tree. In the car, Suzumi introduces herself, but Aya doesn't respond. When they arrive at Suzumi's house, Aya quickly falls asleep. The next day, Suzumi tells Yuhi and Aya that Aya is a tennyo, an angel or celestial maiden.
3	"The One Who Descended to Earth"; Transliteration: "Gekai e Orishi Mono" (Japanese: 下界へ降りし者)	4 May 2000
Suzumi explains to Aya that the Mikages are the descendants of the legendary celestial maiden, and that they have been killing girls her age for a long time. Aya does not believe it, and later sneaks away from the Aogiri house to return to her own home. She falls asleep there in her living room, awakening near sunset. While cleaning her face, she has a vision letting her know the hospital where Aki and her mother are at. Aya goes there while the Aogiris are searching for her. Meanwhile, her cousin Kagami tasks Toya with protecting both Aya and Aki, and making sure they do not see each other. At the hospital Aya is misdirected to her mother's room. Her mother tries to kill her, believing that Aya had killed her father (when in reality it was her grandfather's doing). As Yuhi reaches the room, it explodes and he sees Aya transform into a dark blue-haired, golden-eyed woman who says that she is the celestial maiden who had descended from Heaven, who calls herself, Ceres.
4	"The Stolen Celestial Robe"; Transliteration: "Ubawareta Hagoromo" (Japanese: 奪われた羽衣)	11 May 2000
Ceres tells Yuhi that Aya is a personification created over the last 16 years, and that they are both the same yet different from each other. Sensing Toya nearby, Ceres attacks him, opening a portal in the floor to take him to another floor. She then attempts to attack Aya's mother-(who was knocked unconscious from the earlier explosion), but Yuhi stands in the way. She tells him not to interfere, because she does not want to hurt him as he is not a member of the Mikage. When she goes down to where Toya is, she demands to know where her robe is. As Toya does not know Ceres moves to kill him, but Yuhi holds her back. Ceres declares that she will kill every Mikage family member and agent to pay them back for stealing her robe and humiliating her centuries ago. Yuhi kisses her, causing her to transform back into Aya. Aya's mother falls into a coma, and Aya is confused and upset to realize that she does not remember what happened and wants to know what happened. Aki, meanwhile, overhears his grandfather ordering Kagami to kill Aya and escapes from the hospital in his pajamas to search for her. The next night, he is still looking for her when he is attacked by three delinquint men. As they are beating him up, Aki's eyes glow for a moment and the tone of his voice changes, before he returns to normal. As Aki wonders what that was, Toya arrives. NOTE: Madonna and Britney Spears are mentioned-(in the English dub) when Mrs. Q was having an argument with Yuuhi and Suzumi; while Christopher Robin from Winnie the Pooh was mentioned when Aki's pajamas were yellow-(the same color of Christopher Robin's shirt).
5	"Toya's Destiny"; Transliteration: "Tōya no Shukumei" (Japanese: 十夜の宿命)	18 May 2000
Toya dispatches the three men, and tells Aki to return to the Mikage house. However, Aki refuses, wanting to see Aya, Toya asks Aki if he is willing to risk himself, but Aki notes that he and Aya need each other and that Aya is the only sister that he has, so Toya takes him to the Aogiri mansion. Meanwhile, Aya finds a book in the guest room about the celestial maiden in order to get more information and knowledge about it. Once they arrive at the Aogiri estate, Toya tells Aki to not mention anything about him to Aya, although Aki agrees, he does not understand why before leaving Toya's car. Aya is suddenly surprised upon seeing her brother and cries as they are reunited and they hug, which is witnessed by Suzumi, Yuhi, and Mrs. Q-(who is video taping the touching moment before Suzumi orders her to stop). She decides not to tell him about the celestial being, but that night as they sleep together in Aya's room, Ceres emerges and attacks Aki, strangling him. She says he is her sworn enemy, the Mikage who stole her robe, and that the scars on his body are the ones she gave him-(in the first episode). She repeatedly demands her robe be returned to her, and tries to attack Aki-(who is still confused as to why Ceres is targeting him). Toya, strangely unharmed by her attacks, escapes with Aki while Yuhi uses a kiss to bring Aya back. Outside, Kagami is waiting for them and takes Aki away into his car. When Aya catches up, only Toya is there. He tells her that Aki was taken away. When she demands to know what happened to her, and whether she attacked Aki, he points out her open bathrobe. He asks her to go with him and takes her to his apartment where she goes to take a shower. Later on, Toya tells her to stay away from Aki for both their sakes. Aya asks who he is, but he says he has no memories of his own except of the names Toya and Mikage. He works for Kagami because a month before Kagami told him that he had a way to restore Toya's lost memories. After talking, he offers to let her sleep with her. He also gives her the birthday present from Aki, the same red earrings she had purchased for him. Aya cries as she holds them. Toya wraps his arms around her and promises to hold her until she stops trembling. She eventually falls asleep in his bed lying in his arms, realizing that she truly loves him deeply and does not care if he is working with the enemy.
6	"The C Project"; Transliteration: "C Purojekuto" (Japanese: Cプロジェクト)	25 May 2000
In the morning, Aya calls Yuhi to let him know where she is. When he realizes she spent the night with Toya, he quickly goes to retrieve her, while dragging a sleepy Mrs. Q along with him. After parting from Toya, they follow him to the Mikage corporate headquarters in hope of finding Aki. Kagami sees Aya and the others enter, and lets her past the security gate, immediately locking it behind her to separate her from the others. Aya continues up an elevator, and at the top finds Kagami waiting for her. Shocked upon seeing his face, Aya attempts to close the elevator until Kagami stops her, he promises Aya he doesn't want nor does he have the desire to kill her, saying that it's their grandfather who wants her dead; then leads her to a room claiming he wants to talk as Aya asks him what did they do to her mother and why her father had to die in vain, then warns Kagami to not do anything to harm Aki. He locks her inside, saying he wants to experiment on Ceres, and demanding Aya let her out or they will never get out. She refuses, so Kagami attacks her by attempting to take her clothes of-(leading Aya to slap him across the face) attempting to escape but is unable to, suddenly as Kagami is loosening his tie and undoing his shirt, Aya ask Kagami why he is doing these things to her, to which he responds that it is legal for cousins to get married and over the past generations the Mikage has done so as part of family tradition, he reveals to Aya that both of her parents are second cousins and the reason for this is that it's considered forbidden taboo for people with celestial blood and people with foreign/outside blood to mingle with each other, which would mean that Aya and others like her would be forced to suffer. He attempts to seduce Aya and release Ceres from within her. When she still refuses, he kisses her in order to get her to comply, then opens up a partition, letting her see Aki and Toya in another room. At the sight of Aki, Ceres emerges and destroys the room. Kagami sprays her with a numbing gas to stop her from moving. In response to Kagami's questions, she explains that she reappears in the female descendants that most closely resemble her, with Aya being the closest yet. Kagami takes a sample of her blood from a syringe, then Yuhi arrives ordering him to slowly move away from Aya/Ceres. Seeing Kagami about to gas Yuhi, Ceres holds on to Yuhi and flies out through a broken hole in the building. He asks why she needs her robe when she can fly, but she says she must have it to return home to heaven. When he asks if she cannot live as Aya, Ceres changes back to Aya, causing them to fall into a pool below. Aki decides not to see Aya again until Ceres is gone, and agrees to help Kagami find a way to return Aya to normal. Kagami, however, has no intention of destroying Ceres. He tells Alexander to initiate to the "Celestial Project" otherwise known as "the C Project."
7	"Celestial Awakening"; Transliteration: "Mezameta C Genomā" (Japanese: 目覚めたCゲノマー)	1 June 2000
As Mrs. Q drives Aya and Yuhi to school the next morning, Aya has a vision of a girl burning. Nearby they find Yuki Urakawa, a classmate of theirs, who had fallen unconscious. As Yuhi and Aya discuss what to do, she awakens and says she wants to go to school. They take her to the school infirmary. Toya is there working as a school doctor, having been given fake memories by Kagami. He tells Aya she should have nothing more to do with him, as he only wants Ceres. As they return the infirmary, they discover the school nurse being burned alive. Aya later discovers that Yuki is having an affair with one of the school teachers. She promises Yuki she will keep her secret, but the doctor overhears them talking during lunch and tells Yuki that they can never see each other again because Aya has learned of their secret. An explosion rocks the school which causes a commotion amongst the students and Yuhi who calls out to Aya. She gets lost in the ensuing fire. As the smoke overtakes her, Toya appears and takes her to the school pool. When she asks why he rescued her, thinking that he only cares about Ceres, he tells her that he does but only in theory and kisses Aya and tells her he suddenly found himself looking for her. He wonders if that's what they calk love and says he must find out who he is so they do not hurt each other. A furious Yuhi arrives and orders Toya to get away from Aya. Before he leaves, Toya tells them both that Kagami is gathering up all those who have the celestial maiden genes, C-genomes, as part of the C Project. Yuki arrives and attacks Aya with her pyrokinetic powers and abilities. Yuhi blocks the attack, getting burned himself, and both of them are thrown into the pool. Ceres emerges from within Aya and tries to attack the doctor controlling Yuki, but Yuki stops her, begging Ceres not to hurt him. The doctor gets angry at Yuki for not fighting Ceres. Hurt by his words, Yuki cries as she remembers how he told her he loved her before she holds on to him and envelops them both in flames, killing them both. Aya regains control of her body, and to her relief finds Yuhi is hurt, but alive, behind her. At the Mikage Corporation, Kagami shackles Toya and forbids him from leaving the building, until Toya can stop playing "little love games" with Aya. NOTE: In the English version of this episode, the 1982 film Blade Runner was mentioned while Kagami was having a conversation with Toya stating "Memories made replicants more human".
8	"The Mikage Conspiracy"; Transliteration: "Mikageke no Inbō" (Japanese: 御景家の陰謀)	8 June 2000
Yuhi recovers from his wounds, having been protected from fatal injuries by the angel headband. His father and brother come to visit, but Yuhi refuses to see them at first. Aya is annoyed by Tomonori, Yuhi's brother, seeming lack of concern over Yuhi, but Tomonori only responds by flirting with her. Yuhi comes to the room and he vaguely thanks his father for coming, then tells them to leave as "that woman" would be upset if he was there. Tomonori lashes back that Yuhi is just the abandoned son of a mistress, and has no right to refer to his father's wife as "that woman." Suzumi rides back with her father-in-law and Tomonori to the main Aogiri house, while Yuhi explains why he lied about his mother dying, and that only his brother Kazuma was the only one in the main family who seemed to love him. Yuhi says he does not need a family, since he was abandoned, but Aya cries at him for saying such sad things. She reminds him no one can survive alone and that he will find someone to romantically love just as much. Yuhi tells her he wants her to be that person, and pushes her to the floor, kissing her. Aya pushes him away, and he yells that he loves her, then holds her down as he kisses her again. Mrs. Q interrupts Aya and Yuhi, and after she's gone he apologizes for his behavior. Meanwhile, Kagami realizes that Suzumi is a C-genome and sends his men to capture her. Aki has been hooked up to a machine that lets him search his own memories. He asks where Toya is, and Kagami tells him that Toya was playing love games with Aya. The Mikage attack the Aogiri car, forcing it off the road. Suzumi takes over driving, promising to get them back to the main house. Kagami calls Aya to taunt her about Yuki, and tell her Yuki's power surge was caused by her being injected with Aya's blood. He also tells her that another woman close to her is about to have the same experience. Suzumi gets everyone back to the house, but the Mikage men are waiting for them and use gas to knock them unconscious.
9	"The Angel's Promise"; Transliteration: "Tennyo no Chikai" (Japanese: 天女の誓い)	15 June 2000
Strange glasses are put on Suzumi, connecting her to a nearby machine. Aya realizes Suzumi has been captured by the Mikages and she, with Yuhi, head to the main house. The machine feeds Suzumi memories of her late husband, Kazuma. Yuhi and Aya defeat the men outside, but inside they are stopped when one of the men puts a gun to Yuhi's father's head. Aya and Yuhi are tasered. Yuhi tries to awaken Suzumi by calling out to her, but she cannot hear them. One of the Mikage men shoots at Yuhi to shut him up, but Yuhi's father blocks the shot, getting hit in the shoulder instead. Realizing they cannot do anything, Aya willingly calls to Ceres for help. Ceres quickly dispatches the man and destroys the machinery, but Suzumi does not awaken. Entrenched in her memories, Suzumi will only wake up if she is willing to return to reality. As they listen to Suzumi talking in her sleep, Ceres and the Aogiris discover that Suzumi was three months pregnant and had miscarried when Kazuma died. Crying, Yuhi continues trying to call out to her and eventually his voice reaches her. After Kazuma's death and the loss of their unborn baby, Suzumi tries to kill herself, but was stopped by Yuhi. Remembering she had a brother who needed her the will to live, and remembering that moment that enables her to wake up from the dream. At the Mikage headquarters, Aki demands to speak with Toya. Kagami agrees and asks Toya to choose between Aya and his memories. Toya says he chooses Aya. Aki frees Toya from his handcuffs, thanking him for protecting Aya. As he talks, Aki's tone changes and he stabs Toya with one of the handcuffs saying that he will never give Aya to him or anyone else. Aki returns to himself when Kagami touches him, leaving Aki upset at what he had done. In the car, Ceres and Yuhi talk, and she has him promise to show him the truth about people, as she has no trust in them. Aya returns, and she promises she will stop the C-Project, and that she will rely on Ceres to help her from now on.
10	"Chidori's Flight"; Transliteration: "Chidori no Hishō" (Japanese: 千鳥の飛翔)	22 June 2000
A bacterial infection appears in Tochigi that is making people sick. Yuhi and Aya suspect it is part of the C-Project. A young girl named Chidori Kuruma comes to the Aogiri house looking for Yuhi. She had seen him flying with Ceres the month before-(as shown by a photograph that she had taken during that time), and wants them to come to Tochigi to meet her brother, Shota. Shota, who has paralyzed for the last two years, was hospitalized three days before after being afflicted by the same bacteria. Chidori wants Aya to fly with Shota, to help keep him from giving up on his dreams of being a pilot. Aya promises to take him flying. In one of the waiting areas, Yuhi is holding her when Toya appears, working as a doctor in the hospital. He does not say anything and walks past them. Aya leaves Yuhi and follows, upon catching up she asks him about the newly discovered bacteria, and why he is not bothered by Yuhi holding her. Toya says he can only give what he knows. Aya kisses him on the lips, and tells him to show her his feelings towards her by warmly embracing her. That night at Chidori's house, Aya and Yuhi have dinner with Chidori and her grandparents-(her and Shota's legal guardians) who thank the two of them for their hospitality and Yuhi's great cooking; while at the table, Yuhi talks about his plans to take cooking classes and attend culinary school once he graduates and notes that he wants to open up his own restaurant someday. Later, Yuhi, Aya, and Mrs. Q spend the night with Chidori; while preparing themselves for bed, Chidori tells Aya of how she and Shota lost their parents two years ago in a bus collision that crippled Shota: she explains that they were heading to an aquarium on a rainy day and that the bus they were on had spiraled out of control and killed their parents on impact while they were protecting them. Chidori shows Aya a scar on her shoulder that she got from the accident, suddenly Aya walks over to Chidori, telling her of how her own father died while trying to protect her, with Chidori commenting that their situations are the same as each other. At the Mikage headquarters, Alex tries to help Aki into triggering any more of his past memories but fail. Kagami walks in telling Aki that his grandfather is not doing so well and asks him to go visit. The next day, Aya overhears Toya and Shota talking about Toya being alone and feeling happy because he never had anything or anyone precious to him, until now and that he is afraid that he will hurt her by being near her. Back at headquarters, Aki spots a large portrait of Ceres on the wall, he walks towards it and proceeds to kiss it, upon coming back to his senses, he stops and backs away, Kagami is seen behind a door, having been secretly watching Aki. Aya meets up with Toya, but Ceres demands to come out. Aya is afraid that Ceres will attack him, but stops resisting and allows Ceres to emerge. Toya spots Ceres and attempts to attack her, saying that he had called Aya and not her, until Ceres asks Toya who and what he is and tells him that if he really strongly loves and cares about Aya, he needs to get away from the Mikage. She also notes that she feels she has seen him somewhere before, but doesn't know if the memories are hers or Aya's. Toya receives an emergency call from the hospital saying that more patients are experiencing terrible side affects from the virus, leading hundreds of doctors and nurses into rushing to help aid the patients. In a flashback, as the sun is setting, she gives him Aya's choker, telling him to wear it instead of the one from the Mikage if he truly deeply does love and care for Aya. Ceres then goes to Yuhi and the others, so she can take Shota on the promised flight. During the flight, one of the patients infected by the bacteria awakens their dormant celestial powers and abilities, sending out a tremendously strong destructive blast of bright pink-colored energy that knocks Shota out of Ceres' arms.
11	"Stir of Emotions"; Transliteration: "Ugokidasu Kokoro" (Japanese: うごきだす気持(こころ))	29 June 2000
Ceres saves Shota, before he falls to the ground, taking the brunt of the fall for him and knocking her unconscious. Upset that Aya was hurt protecting him, just like his parents, Shota starts to wheel away. Toya clears the hospital room around Akiyama, the patient who sent out the strong energy blast, as Akiyama sends out another destructive energy blast that destroys the roof. Shota is caught in the blast and is knocked down out of his wheelchair to the floor below. Chidori begins feeling sorry as she sees Shota in his current condition. She blames herself for the death of their parents and her brother's disability, and wishes that she had never begged her parents to take her and Shota to the aquarium that day, despite the fact that they were unable to because of the rain. Aya reassures Chidori that it was not her or Shota's fault. Yuhi tells Shota to slowly crawl backwards, as the rubble he is on is too weak to support anymore weight. Yuhi leaves to try to get to the other side, but runs into Akiyama. Before Shota falls, Aya helps him find the will to live and to remember his dream at last. As he crawls back to safety, the rubble falls. Shota catches himself and is able to pull himself back up. Yoshizuka, another patient who has awakened to his C-Genomes, appears in front of him, grabbing Shota by the arm and hurting him. Chidori, wanting to protect Shota, awakens her own dormant celestial abilities and transforms into an older, taller, and much prettier version of herself, similar to Aya's transformation into Ceres, but retaining her own mind, will, and personality. Toya knocks Akiyama unconscious, rescuing Yuhi, and confirms they're earlier suspicious that the vaccine spread by the Mikage was something to awaken C-Genomes in people. Chidori uses her amazingly strong and powerful celestial abilities to destroy Yoshizuka's arm, freeing Shota. He falls, but Yuki is able to catch him. Toya appears and throws a chain around Chidori. Aya begs him to stop. Brought back to the roof by Yuhi, Shota stands for the first time in two years promising not to give up anymore if Toya will promise not to take Chidori away. Toya releases her and leaves without a word. Chidori decides to go with Aya and Yuhi, revealing that despite her elementary school appearance, she is actually a high school student. Meanwhile, Aki finds himself obsessively watching the videos of Aya that Toya recorded, and worries that he is losing his mind.
12	"The Silver Choker"; Transliteration: "Gin no Chōkā" (Japanese: 銀のチョーカー)	6 July 2000
Kagami takes Toya to task for failing to capture Chidori. While in his room, Aki writes a letter to Aya, desperate to finish it while he is still himself. Toya comes to see him as Aki collapses out of his chair. Aki cries, afraid that the strange machine that Kagami has been using on him is making him lose himself, and wishes that he have his normal life back. Toya asks if Aki wishes to leave, as Aya antagonizes over how she can stop the Mikage. Toya calls Aya from the facility to tell her that he and Aki are leaving the Mikage that night for good, and asks if she can control Ceres. The agree to meet at the overpass where they first met Toya at midnight. Toya has Aki wait in his room while he has his last meeting with Kagami. Kagami wants him to hook him up the same machine that Aki has been subjected to, and promises he is going to return Toya's memories. Toya uses his dagger to destroy the machine. He cuts the Mikage collar from his neck, then uses his dagger's unique properties to destroy the door. Toya heads to Aki's room as Kagami and Alex wonder how he got the dagger in when he had been searched before he came in. Toya makes it past the defense systems and guards, moving at inhuman speed. At Aki's room, he faces Wei, the leader of the Mikage security force and Aki's new bodyguard. Toya defeats him after a short battle. Wei recovers before he and Aki can escape. Wei steps on Toya's dagger and badly hurts him, but Toya makes the dagger reappear in his hand and wounds Wei. As Toya and Aki make their way to the garage, Toya gets shot by some of the guards. Toya blasts a way out of the garage, but as he moves to leave, Aki's eyes start glowing again. He picks up a metal shared and stabs Toya in the leg with it. When he comes to, he is horrified at what he has done, and says he can no longer control what is slowly emerging deep within him. Crying, he tells Toya go without him, as he cannot see Aya the way he is now, and gives Toya the letter he wrote to her. Doors close between them, and Toya is hit with a spotlight. Aya, Yuhi, Chidori, and Mrs. Q wait long into the night for them at overpass. Toya, badly wounded, makes it there as the clock approaches four in the morning, wearing Aya's choker.
13	"Relic of the Mikage"; Transliteration: "Mikageke no Goshintai" (Japanese: 御景家の御神体)	13 July 2000
As Aya and Toya reunite at the overpass as planned, Toya collapses from his injuries. While he is in pain, Toya gives Aya the letter from Aki. He prepares to return to the Mikage building to persuade Aki again to leave, but she stops him, saying that he will die if he tries to. Toya says he does not mind, but Yuhi scolds him, telling him not to make Aya any sadder. Back at the Aogiri house, Aya cries as she rereads Aki's letter. A convalescing Toya asks whether it was all right for him to come to the Aogiris', and Aya begins to explain that it was Yuhi who allowed it. They are interrupted by Yuhi bringing in a tray of food. Aya follows him out of the room and apologizes for not reciprocating Yuhi's strong and true romantic feelings, but he stops her. He says he will stand aside for now, but swears that if Toya ever hurts Aya, he will take her away. Toya appears behind them and promises to give his all to Aya, if that is what she wants. Alone in his room again, Toya confesses to Aya that he has been scared all this while, but now he's found his own secure place. He shows her how he can make a short dagger blade appear and disappear out of his wrist at will. He asks what kind of a human can he be, with such an unnatural power and ability. Aya decides that she wants to relieve him of his burden of sadness and loneliness. Aya's conscience and other self, Ceres, appears in a mirror and asks her to let her take over her mind and body so that she can destroy the Mikage family, to punish them for taking the lives of so many innocent lives only to increase their own strength and power. Aya refuses and promises instead to get back the celestial robe, as long as Ceres does not hurt Aki. Ceres warns her that Aki will not be coming back, and that he has been reborn and reincarnated is already taking over. Aya visits her mother at the hospital and reads Aki's letter to her. As she leaves, she discovers that Aki has written a message inside the envelope, asking Aya to kill him if he is taken over. Aki goes to visit his grandfather. They go into a sealed vault that contains Ceres' mummy, the guardian deity of the Mikage family. The sight of the relic inflicts scars on Aki once more, the mark of the Progenitor himself, who had been slashed to death by Ceres. Aki has been fully taken over by the spirit of the Progenitor. His delighted grandfather declares that Aki is his successor, the one who will protect the family against Ceres' celestial curse and make the Mikage family even stronger and more powerful. Aki kills his grandfather, notices that the mummy is just her empty shell and begins searching for Ceres.
14	"The Return of the Ancestor"; Transliteration: "Kakuseishita Shiso" (Japanese: 覚醒した始祖)	20 July 2000
Aya returns from the hospital and finds Toya in his room struggling to bandage his wounds. She helps him and lays her head on his back, wishing that the moment would last forever. Meanwhile, Kagami removes Aki's evidence. He looks at the mummy and muses that he understands why Ceres kept reincarnating since her body cannot rest in peace. He knows that the relic is merely a thing and more important is the Ceres that was reincarnated in Aya. The Aogiris are sitting down to dinner when their servant Kyū runs in and tells them that Toya is nowhere to be found. Suzumi knows that Toya has decided to act alone in keeping an eye on the Mikages and has promised to keep in touch, but Aya, Yuhi and Chidori set out in search of Toya before she can tell them. Aya catches up with Toya by a fountain. Toya explains that the Mikages will come after him and that he doesn't want to leave Aki alone. He promises to watch over Aya. Leaving the Mikage mansion, Aki detects Ceres' presence and forces Kagami to drive towards her. He appears on the scene as Toya and Aya warmly and lovingly embrace. Aya runs over to Aki, but is warned by Ceres to get away from him. Aki pulls her into a deep, passionate kiss. Aya realizes that he is not Aki and pulls away. Aki tells them that the real Aki has gone to sleep deep within his own subconscious. A distraught Aya transforms into Ceres and Aki taunts her, telling her that she will always be his woman and that she will never ever find her celestial robe. As he makes his threats he collapses due to lack of sleep and hunger, as Aki had not eaten or drunk anything for a few days as he struggled for control. Toya runs forward to get Aki but Wei gets there first. He calls Toya a traitor and promises to kill him someday. As Kagami and the others drive away he ponders whether the reappearance of the Progenitor will be good or bad for the C-project. Toya goes on alone to keep an eye on the Mikage. Aya stays in her room and watches old videos of Aki. She tells Yuhi and Chidori she cannot go on any longer knowing that there was nothing left of Aki in the man she met at the fountain. Yuhi reassures Aya that Aki is merely "asleep" and together with Chidori encourages her not to give up on him. NOTE: In the English dub version of this episode, Aya calls Yuuhi "Garçon"-(a French term for "waiter") when she asked him to make them lunch, while Yuuhi replied by calling Aya "Mademoiselle".
15	"Toya's Past"; Transliteration: "Tōya no Kako" (Japanese: 十夜の過去)	27 July 2000
The Aogiris have moved to Matsubara on Toya's suggestion, to look into the legend of the hagoromo there. They are staying in Yuuhi's father's villa and attending Kaisei high school. They meet a girl named Miori Sahara who looks just like Aya/Ceres. Miori tells Aya that her childhood sweetheart disappeared a year ago. Aya meets Toya by the sea and tells him that their investigations revealed that the hagoromo at a local shrine turned out to be just a piece of cloth. Toya looks at the sea and memories flash back to him. He sees Miori and recognizes her. As he crosses the street towards her he gets hit by a car and Aya's choker falls off. Though he is not badly hurt, he no longer recognizes Aya and Yuhi. They later go to visit him. Miori tells them that he is Toya Mizuki, her childhood sweetheart, and that he is still amnesiac. At school, Miori asks Aya to leave him alone, for his sake. Yuhi goes to see Toya and tells him that he is taking Aya away, as he promised before. Aya cuts her hair on an impulse. Toya meets her on the beach and tells her that whenever he tries to remember the past year he gets headaches. She gives him the choker back and he hugs her before he can stop himself. He asks if anything happened between them during the past year but Aya denies it and walks away and weeps. Aya asks Yuhi to help her forget Toya and decides to give herself to him. But he pulls away, telling her he loves her and that he will wait for her memories of Toya to fade. Aya cries and wishes she could disappear. Wei and his men come to the Mizuki house to pick up Toya, but Toya asks to see the Mikages. Back in Tokyo, Kagami tells Toya that they had some misunderstandings in the past due to Aya Mikage, and that Toya should eliminate her now that he is back in Kagami's employ. Ceres reappears and flies to Tokyo. Toya is told to eliminate her, and Miori asks Kagami why Toya doesn't love her as he is supposed to. He replies that it is not his fault. Toya corners Ceres. She notes that he has abandoned the choker that contains Aya's feelings. Miori appears and orders Toya to torture and kill Aya. If he refuses, she will. To their astonishment, Miori transforms into a vengeful Ceres look-alike.
16	"Another Ceres"; Transliteration: "Mō Hitori no Seresu" (Japanese: もうひとりのセレス)	3 August 2000
Ceres and Miori face off above the Mikage building. Miori asks Ceres to transform back into Aya so that she can have her revenge against Aya. Miori reveals that she is Aya's cousin and that her mother was killed by Aya/Ceres on her sixteenth birthday. Aki tells Toya that his memories as Toya Mizuki are false and tries to kill Toya. Deep within her mental cocoon, Aya hears Aki's voice telling her not to run away. Aya returns and calls out to Toya, who gets the strength to fend off Aki. Toya tears off the Mikage collar and protects her from Miori. Miori tells Toya of her wish that they could live together happily with his fake past, then flies up to the roof of the building and throws herself off before Toya can stop her. Aya is deeply scarred by the incident and refuses to eat. Toya goes to the Aogiri residence and tells Suzumi that he still cannot remember Aya. He goes to the sleeping Aya and leaves his dagger with her so they will always be together. Toya then sets off in search of his real self, with the flicker of a true memory as his guide.
17	"Bewitching Affection"; Transliteration: "Hikiyoserareru Chikara" (Japanese: 魅きよせられる愛(ちから))	10 August 2000
An unconscious Toya washes up on the beach and is brought to a clinic. He tells the doctor that he was travelling around beaches in search of his memory of the ocean, was chased by thugs and dumped into the sea. The doctor orders him to stay until he recovers and can work off his bill. Toya sneaks out and is fired on by Wei's men, but is found by the doctor before they can get to him. Aya visits her mother in hospital and finds Aki there. Aki takes her captive and, back at the Mikage building, tries to rape her. Toya's dagger sends out a pulse of energy and throws Aki off. Toya senses that Aya is in danger, takes the doctor's motorcycle and hurries to Tokyo. Aki orders Kagami's men to drug her and take her to the lab, while he goes on ahead. Alec Howell is told to give her a drug to manipulate her mind. He objects that the shock to her system might cripple her, but Kagami says that Ceres will then take over, which is his objective. Aya is put in a truck and driven over to the lab. Ceres lends Aya her powers to resist the effects of Howell's machine. Toya is tracked by Wei and his men in helicopters. He leaps off his motorcycle and onto the helicopter and takes Wei captive, ordering them to fly in the direction of the truck. After forcing the men to jump into the sea, he leaps onto the roof of the truck and lets the helicopter crash. He goes in to rescue Aya and Howell releases her. Howell tells Toya that he cannot ask for forgiveness or even understanding, and that they just wanted her cooperation in ensuring the survival of the human race. Toya brings Aya to a desolate shack and waits for the drug to wear off. According to Howell, the drug should wear off at 4 a.m. If not, Aya will never wake up from her dream state. When she cannot wake up at the appointed time, Toya cries. Ceres tells Aya that Toya is calling for her, and Aya finally wakes up. Toya warmly embraces her and asks her to come with him in search of the hagoromo and his true memories.
18	"Fleeting Happiness"; Transliteration: "Tsukanoma no Shiawase" (Japanese: つかの間の幸せ)	17 August 2000
Aya and Kagami go to visit their respective mothers. Kagami's mother is mentally ill having been confined to a mental institution since Kagami's childhood and obsessed with her son getting perfect grades. Kagami reveals that he himself is obsessed with Ceres' "perfection", and has been since fifth grade when he found an old picture of Ceres emerging from a Mikage girl. Aya explains to her unconscious mother that she is going to live with Toya, and he assures her that he will protect Aya. Her mother reacts for the first time with a squeeze of their hands. Aya and Toya then return to Niigata to thank the doctor for looking after Toya. They stay and find work in Niigata. One night, they accompany the doctor on a call to Sado Island, but fall overboard in the stormy sea. Toya carries Aya out of the water and is shocked to find a webbed red material between his fingers. Afterwards, he spends hours staring out at sea. Walking along the beach, Aya finds a shell and holds it out for Toya to see. This seems to trigger a memory in Toya, and he urgently asks her to remember an island. She recalls that her family once vacationed at Hachijo Island ten years ago when she was six years old. They go to the island, where Aya remembers seeing an already grown-up Toya and offering him a shell. Toya's memories return, and he recounts how an old hermit on the island once found a baby encased in a membrane. Astonishingly, the baby grew rapidly to a fully-grown man. The process took ten days, hence Toya's name ("tenth night"). The old man forbade Toya to leave the island, and Toya is content with that until he meets the young Aya. Upon the old man's death, he leaves the island to search for Aya but is struck by a car. In his amnesiac state, he remembers only her last name – "Mikage" – and his own, "Toya". He wanders to the Mikage building and is taken in by Kagami and trained as one of his men. Aya abruptly changes into Ceres, who announces that Toya and Aya have seven months to find her celestial robe, otherwise she will kill all of the Mikages' including Aki.
19	"Chidori's Confession"; Transliteration: "Chidori no Kokuhaku" (Japanese: 千鳥の告白)	24 August 2000
Aya and Toya come back from their long journey with Ceres's warning of there being only six months left to find her celestial robe. Aya faints from exhaustion on their way back to the Aogiri house. While she is sleeping, Toya and Suzumi learn that Aki has captured Chidori and Shota to do C-genome testing on them. Toya and Yuhi go to the Mikage headquarters with a group of soldiers to save Chidori and Shota. While Yuhi finds and rescues Chidori, Toya searches for Shota. Yuhi and Chidori pause in the parking lot to let Chidori rest a moment.mWhile embracing, Chidori spots a man about to shoot Yuhi and pushes him out of the way, getting shot herself. Yuhi almost shoots the man in the head when Chidori stops him. Yuhi carries Chidori out of the building, while she weakly tells him of her true and deep feelings for him until she dies and Yuhi screams in anguish. Meanwhile, Toya finds Shota and is able to free him, but is captured by the Mikages and brought to the Progenitor.
20	"Toya's Death"; Transliteration: "Tōya Shisu" (Japanese: 十夜死す)	31 August 2000
Aya willingly goes to the Mikage and asks where Toya is. She finds out that he is dead. She sees a vivid vision of how he had died and faints from shock upon learning that the Progenitor, her own twin brother had killed her husband.
21	"The Ancient Tennyo"; Transliteration: "Inishie no Tennyo" (Japanese: いにしえの天女)	7 September 2000
The Progenitor captures Ceres on her way to reunite with her long-lost celestial robe. She told him that she had never loved him in the first place and that his only use was for creating seed in order to perfect progeny and more superior human descendants. He was shot and then locked up. Ceres and Aya had a conversation about what really happened in the past how Mikagi and Ceres met for the first time, fell in love, Mikage became corrupted by Ceres's power and his death. Then Aya awoke and Ceres does not answer Aya's question of if she really had indeed strongly loved the Progenitor. NOTE: This is the only episode where Toya does not make an appearance.
22	"Song of Redemption"; Transliteration: "Fukushū no Utagoe" (Japanese: 復讐の歌声)	14 September 2000
Shuro Tsukasa-(a famous pop singer from Okinawa), is One of the descendants of another celestial maiden who took revenge on the Mikage for the death of her cousin-(her singing partner). She sang and destroyed the Mikage's building. The celestial robe is fully re-created and Ceres goes to reunite with it. Howell assists her in bringing her to it so she can be alive again with her mana and become a full-fledged celestial maiden. The chief of the Mikages tells Ceres that he will give her to no one. Toya appears with amazingly large and wide white feathered angel wings.
23	"Mikagi Reborn"; Transliteration: "Yomigaetta Mikagi" (Japanese: 甦ったミカギ)	21 September 2000
Aya yells out Toya's name after he produces her real celestial robe. Aya becomes herself again, but the chief holds her back. The female ancestors of the celestial maiden killed themselves and destroyed the Mikage building. Toya saves Aya from the chief. Yuhi, Toya, and Aya escape to a safe room. Toya tells Aya how he was created by the mana of the celestial robe after it was discarded. He is about to return the celestial robe to Aya, but sadly this means that he will become a complete human being. Aya tells a shocked Toya that she is pregnant and is going to have his baby. The Progenitor finds the new celestial robe and literally merges with it becoming the original Mikagi. He kills almost everyone. Toya and Mikagi fight. Toya stabs Mikagi in the throat and jumps into the water after him knowing that he will soon regenerate. Toya does not find him. Yuhi goes to see what happened, but Mikagi stabs Aya through the chest.
24	"Denouement"; Transliteration: "Saigo no Ketchaku o Tsukeru Toki" (Japanese: 最後の決着をつける時)	28 September 2000
Mikagi says that Ceres/Aya will die along with Toya's unborn child. Yuhi stabs him with his chopsticks out of sheer fury. Chidori lent him her power and ability. Toya comes in screaming her name. Toya gives Aya the celestial robe and he just becomes mortal. Howell and the chief find out that Aya is dying. They run to her. Mikage gets there and tries to kill Toya, but fails when Ceres becomes her true original self, a full-fledged celestial maiden with her full strength and power infant. Aki appears and tells Ceres to kill him and Mikagi. She does so, and finally goes to live in Heaven with Mikagi. He tells her how afraid he was of losing her that it mentally destroyed him. The chief dies on the boat after everyone else gets out. Howell leaks information about the Mikage to the police as instructed. Aya is going to have the baby soon and Yuhi and Mrs. Q visit them on the island. Toya tells Yuhi he might not have much longer to live, maybe two years, maybe longer. The series ends with Toya and Aya talking about their child.
