= List of Pilot Candidate episodes =

The Pilot Candidate anime is an adaptation of the manga series The Candidate for Goddess by Yukiru Sugisaki. Taking place in the distant future, the series follows Zero Enna, one of several candidates to pilot the "Ingrids" (or "Goddesses"), giant humanoid weapons designed to defend humanity's space colonies and its only planet Zion from an alien threat called "Victim".

Pilot Candidate was produced by Xebec, a subsidiary studio of Production I.G., and directed by Mitsuru Hongo. The 12 television episodes of which the series is comprised were aired on Japan's NHK BS2 television channel from January 10 to March 27, 2000. The series was picked up for English distribution by Bandai Entertainment in early 2001 and aired weekly on the late night Cartoon Network block Adult Swim from February 24 to May 12, 2002. Bandai has released the series on DVD in Japan in four volumes. A thirteenth episode, actually an original video animation (OVA), was released in Japan on May 25, 2002. A box set containing all 13 episodes, Emotion the Best: The Candidate for Goddess, was released on April 22, 2011. Four DVDs of the Pilot Candidate television episodes, as well as a Pilot Candidate Complete Collection, were released in North America. The OVA has not been published in this territory.

The Pilot Candidate television series features one opening theme, "Zion o Mezase!" (希望の星(ZION)をめざせ!; lit. 'Aim for Zion, the Planet of Hope'), and one ending theme, "Chance" (チャンス, Chansu), both composed by Tomoyuki Asakawa. The OVA features the same opening with a different ending theme, "Kagayaki" (かがやき; lit. 'Shimmering'), also by Asakawa.

== Episode list ==
No.	Title	Original release date	English release date
1	"Connection"; Transliteration: "Setsuzoku" (Japanese: 接続)	January 10, 2000	February 24, 2002
2	"Alignment"; Transliteration: "Douchou" (Japanese: 同調)	January 17, 2000	March 3, 2002
3	"EX"	January 24, 2000	March 10, 2002
4	"Consciousness"; Transliteration: "Jikaku" (Japanese: 自覚)	January 31, 2000	March 17, 2002
5	"Partner"; Transliteration: "Pātonā" (Japanese: パートナー)	February 7, 2000	March 24, 2002
6	"Combination"; Transliteration: "Konbinēshon" (Japanese: コンビネーション)	February 14, 2000	March 31, 2002
7	"PRO-ING"	February 21, 2000	April 7, 2002
8	"Ground Battle"; Transliteration: "Rikusen" (Japanese: 陸戦)	February 28, 2000	April 14, 2002
9	"Death"; Transliteration: "Shi" (Japanese: 死)	March 6, 2000	April 21, 2002
10	"Dreams"; Transliteration: "Yume" (Japanese: 夢)	March 13, 2000	April 28, 2002
11	"Jealousy"; Transliteration: "Natemi" (Japanese: 妬み)	March 20, 2000	May 5, 2002
12	"Drift"; Transliteration: "Dakuryuu" (Japanese: 濁流)	March 27, 2000	May 12, 2002
13	"Friends"; Transliteration: "Nakama" (Japanese: 仲間)	N/A	N/A
This episode is an OVA.
