= List of Gate Keepers episodes =

Gate Keepers (ゲートキーパーズ, Gēto Kīpāzu) is primarily a role-playing video game for the PlayStation. The game was then adapted into a manga series written by Hiroshi Yamaguchi (山口 宏, Yamaguchi Hiroshi) and drawn by Keiji Gotoh. The anime series was produced by GONZO and was directed by Koichi Chigira. The network WOWOW aired the 24-episode series from April 3 to September 8, 2000. In 2001, Geneon Entertainment USA (then known as Pioneer) acquired the series and released them in eight volumes on DVD and VHS. In 2004, Geneon re-released the series under the Signature Series label. In 2007, Geneon USA went out of business and left the series (including the GK21 OVA's) out-of print.

== Episode list ==
No.	Title	Original release date
1	"Begin the Defense of Earth!"; Transliteration: "Chikyuu Bouei wo Kaishi Seiyo!" (Japanese: 地球防衛を開始せよ!)	April 3, 2000
It is May 1969 in Japan. As a new era of prosperity begins for this small country, the world at large has seen a rise in unnatural disasters. A secret organization, known as A.E.G.I.S. (Alien Exterminating Global Intercept System), has traced their roots to entities known as "Invaders". In an effort to prevent further devastation, the Far Eastern branch is searching for individuals who possess the power to open "gates"; also known as "Gate Keepers". The episode introduces a teenager named Ukiya Shun, who lives with his mother and younger sister Saemi. Ukiya's world drastically changes when his home is endangered in a battle between a group of Invaders and the first Far Eastern Branch recruit, Ruriko Ikusawa. Ukiya's anger over the jeopardy to his home causes him to unknowingly open a gate, which he uses to single-handedly defeat the Invader threat.
2	"Stand Up For Peace!"; Transliteration: "Heiwa no Tameni Tachi Agare!" (Japanese: 平和のために立ち上がれ!)	April 10, 2000
We are briefly introduced to Shun's past as he struggles with the decision to become a Gate Keeper, which would move him away from home and force him to switch schools. In his mind, this would mean neglecting his family duties, which Shun believes his deceased father had done. Shun's convictions are tested when his family is once again endangered by an Invader attack! Seeing Shun as a competitor, Ruriko seeks to prove herself as the superior Gate Keeper by attempting to face this new threat alone. However, it is her influence that ultimately pushes Shun into making his choice.
3	"Let the Bewitching Melody Echo!"; Transliteration: "Miwaku no Kyoku wo Hibika Sero!" (Japanese: 魅惑の曲を響かせろ!)	April 17, 2000
As part of his relocation, Shun moves in next to Ruriko and her family. A.E.G.I.S. has assigned them with the task of investigating, as well as protecting potential Gate Keepers. To help him do this, the commander has given Shun some equipment which will enhance his gate ability. Their first assignment is Reiko Asagiri, rumored to cause good visions to all those who listen to her piano playing. A preliminary investigation reveals Reiko to be lacking in certain mental aptitudes. Ukiya and Ruriko must come to the rescue when Invaders threaten the lives of people attending one of her piano recitals. Reiko's true powers are revealed when forced to fight after Ruriko and Shun find the Invader threat to be more than they can handle.
4	"Search For the New Fighter!"; Transliteration: "Arata na Senshi wo Sagase!" (Japanese: 新たな戦士を探せ!)	April 24, 2000
Racing along the Japanese country-side in a bullet train, Shun, Ruriko and Reiko seek out the next candidate, Banba Chotaro (a.k.a. Bancho). Although Bancho doesn't manifest any gate ability, he appears to have incredible strength, which he often uses to pick fights with would-be thugs. Meanwhile, a nearby company is threatening to fill the local salt refinery field. A closer investigation reveals an Invader influence, resulting in the gang once again banding together for a big showdown. All it will take is teamwork, guts, and a really big secret weapon (compliments of Megane, official A.E.G.I.S. mechanic)!
5	"Charge Towards Your Dreams!"; Transliteration: "Yume Heto Muka Tte Kake Nuke Ro!" (Japanese: 夢へと向かって駆け抜けろ!)	May 1, 2000
This time A.E.G.I.S is kind enough to bring a Gate Keeper candidate to them. Kaoru Konoe, a 15-year-old female, has manifested amazing physical abilities far-surpassing those of even the world's best Olympic athletes. Labeled the "Gate of Pursuit", this gate appears to be a hurdle for Konoe. Shun and Ruriko must convince her to join the Far-East Branch. Their efforts are halted when the Invaders strike the newly-opened Tomei Highway. Caught in a fight she sees as not her own, Konoe must decide whether to help the people around her, or resign herself to the belief that some things cannot be overcome.
6	"Infiltrate the Haunted Female Dormitory!"; Transliteration: "Kyoufu no Joshiryou ni Sennyû Seyo!" (Japanese: 恐怖の女子寮に潜入せよ!)	May 8, 2000
After several screw ups in battle, the commander decides that the time has come for a captain to be appointed. With everyone's head filled with visions of power, the group loses focus on working together as a team. Meanwhile, Reiko and Konoe are getting used to dorm life at the school. Strange things seem to be occurring all over Sumire Dormitory, which prompts Shun and everyone to investigate for Invader activities. As they investigate the cause of the strange activities, one after another there numbers diminish as members go missing. Later, Shun gets elected as the new captain, but he does not know who gave him the vote that broke the three-way tie.
7	"Shoot the Enemy Out of the Sky!"; Transliteration: "Oozora no Kanawo Uchi oto Se!" (Japanese: 大空の敵を撃ち落とせ!)	May 18, 2000
By now the Invaders have taken to the skies. Planes have been crashing worldwide, with the most recent activity occurring over the Sea of Japan. Shun is to meet with a member of the Shanghai branch at Atsugi Airbase, where they made an emergency landing while in pursuit of an unidentified aircraft. He must help this agent is finding the Invader...if only he knew who the agent is. Ruriko and Konoe go to guard Haneda Airport, where paranormal frequencies seem to be registering at increasing levels. Unknown to Ruriko, Konoe's private competition with her has already begun. This eventually takes a rest when the Invader threat finally reveals itself in a very unusual way.
8	"Find the Infiltrator!"; Transliteration: "Shinryakusha wo Mitsu Kedase!" (Japanese: 侵略者を見つけだせ!)	May 22, 2000
Up until now the Invaders have been nameless faces. Who are these Invaders, anyway? When paranormal frequencies register at the Gate Keepers' own school, Shun and the rest are faced with the reality of their own situation. It is in this horrible circumstance where the next Gate Keeper manifests their amazing ability; one that carries with it great power, yet brings about even greater sorrow.
9	"Break Down the Gate of Darkness!"; Transliteration: "Shikkoku no Geto Wouchi Yabure!" (Japanese: 漆黒のゲートをうち破れ!)	May 29, 2000
Shun is haunted by visions of the endless faces of the loved ones, struck down by Invaders. He finds it difficult to perform his duties as a Gate Keeper, which causes Ruriko to take matters into her own hands. With attacks occurring more often, and the appending Apollo 11 shuttle landing, Shun struggles to find the conviction to continue on. A new student, Kageyama Reiji, transfers to the school after coming back to Japan from overseas. A protector of women, and somewhat of a playboy, he doesn't seem to be much of a fighter. However, Reiji helps Shun to see exactly what it is he needs to do, and come to grips with this life he now leads.
10	"Shake Free From the Demonic Dream!"; Transliteration: "Akuma no Yume Wofuri Harae!" (Japanese: 悪魔の夢をふり払え!)	June 5, 2000
After defending the Apollo 11 return shuttle in the South Pacific, the Gate Keepers team find their plane attacked on the trip home by a new form of Invader, Akuma Hakushaku (Demon Duke). After crashing on a tropical island, Shun and the others find that the threat has left them. While trapped in paradise, the team seems to be experiencing strange visions of each other. The Gate Keepers discover hidden desires, while the director seems to deliver one of those famous fan-service episodes we all know and love. What secrets are revealed about our young heroes?
11	"Stop That Bullet Train!"; Transliteration: "Ano Shinkansen wo Yamero!" (Japanese: あの新幹線を止めろ!)	June 12, 2000
With the reappearance of a freighter ship from 1963, the A.E.G.I.S. Far-East branch is greeted by another special Invader, calling himself Kikai Shogun (General Machine). With the ability to merge with machines, the general chooses the Hikari bullet-train as his next test subject. Riding this train is Shun and his family, who are returning from a brief vacation. With the train on a full speed course to Tokyo Station, the rest of the Gate Keeper team must intercept it before it crashes. Either the train must be stopped before it reaches the station, or be destroyed!
12	"Fly to the Northern Lands!"; Transliteration: "Kita no Daichi he Tobe!" (Japanese: 北の大地へ飛べ!)	June 19, 2000
Shun and Ruriko are sent north to find out what happened to a missing A.E.G.I.S. cargo plane. The picturesque landscape is the perfect backdrop for romance to bloom, except for the one-eyed Invader monsters lying in wait! However, this isn't the only discovery they end up making. A mysterious girl who speaks in tongue of old, and has the ability to summon the "Gate of Snow", saves them from the outnumbering Invaders. The young girl is alone in this vast wilderness. Only Shun can free her from her secret prison, as she suffers over a history of pain and loss.
13	"Defeat the Invader Executives! (Part One)"; Transliteration: "Taose, Saikyou ni Dai Kanbu! (Zenpen)" (Japanese: 倒せ、最強二大幹部!・前編)	June 26, 2000
Recovered from the crashed cargo plane are four top secret devices from the Western Branch of A.E.G.I.S. Along with the cargo, the Western branch has decided to send in three Gate Keeper veterans to "help" deal with the rise in Invader activity in Japan. These new members are determined to deal with the current situation without the help of their younger Far-East branch counterparts. While prepping three of the devices for the Western Gate Keepers, the fourth is considered a reject, and not used. Jim Skylark ("Gate of Speed"), Jun Thunders ("Gate of Thunder"), and Misao Sakimori ("Gate of Perception") go against the reappearance of the Kikai Shogun. Shun, not liking his back-seat role, tries to take matters into his own hands; ultimately allowing the general to make his getaway.
14	"Defeat the Invader Executives! (Part Two)"; Transliteration: "Taose, Saikyou ni Dai Kanbu! (Kouhen)" (Japanese: 倒せ、最強二大幹部!・後編)	July 3, 2000
Disgraced at the outcome of the previous battle, Shun and the others are given orders to take a break from duty. Although not happy with the decision, Shun returns home to rediscover what a normal life is like. Ruriko attempts the same, but finds herself drawn back to the school, as she cannot let go of her desire to be the best Gate Keeper. Kikai Shogun returns once again, along with Akuma Hakushaku. Together, the Western A.E.G.I.S. veterans are no match for them. Ruriko attempts to save them, but ends up being their crutch. Yukino returns to let Shun know of the battle going on in the distance. In a rush to save Ruriko, Shun is greeted by Megane and Bancho, along with a big surprise.
15	"Stop the Arranged Marriage!"; Transliteration: "O Miai Wobuttsubuse!" (Japanese: お見合いをぶっつぶせ!)	July 10, 2000
Recently Reiji has been after Ruriko to join his Political Thoughts club. She finds herself conflicted over her recent feelings for Shun, and attempts to act on them. However, she finds herself overwhelmed by the competition presented by Kaoru, and decides to try out the club. Meanwhile, the team learns that Ms. Ochiai has a fiancée from an arranged marriage that her mom set up. Finding this man to be abusive, Shun and the others decide to go to the train station in an effort to prevent her from leaving with him. Ruriko must decide if helping her friends is more important than attending Reiji's club meeting.
16	"Send Out the Gate Robo!"; Transliteration: "Getorobo Shutsugeki Seyo!" (Japanese: ゲートロボ出撃せよ!)	July 17, 2000
Up until now, the Gate Keepers team has fought many powerful enemies. In the midst of it all is the lack of contribution from Reiko-chan. Other members have been recently commenting on her lack of focus, as well as her knack for making most situations worse. Realizing her inadequacies as a Gate Keeper, Reiko struggles to find the inner strength to overcome her own weaknesses. When her friend from a nearby daycare center is threatened by Invaders, the courage to fight is discovered in quite an unusual place.
17	"Race Down the Trailless Road!"; Transliteration: "Michi Naki Michi wo Tsuppashire!" (Japanese: 道なき道を突っ走れ!)	July 24, 2000
Ms. Ochiai has recently gone to visit an old college friend, Mami Takegawa. Her friend's fiancée, Mr. Nishiya (a professional race car driver), has recently been acting belligerent to everyone around him. When Ms. Ochiai mentions this to the Commander over the phone, he goes to inspect the situation immediately. After a brief meeting with Mr. Nishiya, the Commander becomes convinced of Invader influence. The discovery leads to a race for their lives as the Commander and Ms. Ochiai are hunted down by a new form of Invader. It is this situation that we are introduced to the Commanders hidden past.
18	"Protect the Invader!?"; Transliteration: "Shinryakusha Inbeda wo Mamori Nuke!?" (Japanese: 侵略者[インベーダー]を守り抜け!?)	July 31, 2000
What is it that drives Fei to be a Gate Keeper? After an encounter with a mean-spirited vendor, she is faced once again with a painful memory from her youth in China. Fei will do almost anything not to relive the pain she has suffered from long ago. Shun and the others trace a paranormal frequency to the old vendors house. When they arrive to investigate, Fei is there with gate open, ready to take down ANYONE who threatens him.
19	"The Opinions of Youths!"; Transliteration: "Yangu no Shuchou wo Kike!" (Japanese: ヤングの主張を聞け!)	August 7, 2000
Reiji's Political Thoughts club has been getting recent attention lately. When his club is invited for a televised public debate competition he invites his good friend Shun, and the others, to attend as his personal guests. But, Megumi has discovered the Reiji has other interesting activities which he is involved in. While attending the debate, Shun is finally enlightened as to his friends political ideals. The discovery is soon over-shadowed by the sudden attack by Invaders. Not wanting to expose their powers to the surrounding public, the Gate Keepers team attempts to take care of the threat in a most unusual way.
20	"Leap Forward Into a New Year!"; Transliteration: "Arata na Nen he Hiyaku Seyo!" (Japanese: 新たな年へ飛躍せよ!)	August 21, 2000
Christmas has come and gone, and the new year has come around filled with the hopes and dreams of many. Only, Shun hasn't come home for the holidays, and Saemi has had enough of her elusive brother. She takes it upon herself to bring him home, after going to get him at the school. After searching around a bit, Saemi encounters Yukino and Hisame. She finally drags Shun home, as well as Yukino, for no one should be alone on New Years. Yukino discovers that there is much missing in her life as she interacts with Saemi. What other discoveries will the new year bring.
21	"Protect the Festival of Progress & Harmony For Mankind!"; Transliteration: "Mamore! Shinpo to Chouwa no Saiten!" (Japanese: 守れ!進歩と調和の祭典!)	August 28, 2000
The commander has been investigating the identity of the evil Gate Keeper known as "Shadow". A recent file leads him to believe he has found the identity of this individual. At the same time, Reiji's Political Thoughts Club has become even more popular after the incident at the debate hall. The popularity is carrying over across all of Japan. Ruriko's father has been offered the job of construction of the World Exposition, a big boost for his small company. His success is short-lived as the crew is transformed into Invaders and he is taken hostage. After arriving on the scene, Shun takes matters into his own hands as he desperately tries to save Ruriko's father. Is Ruriko prepared to sacrifice her father in order to beat the Invader threat?
22	"Destroy the Jet Black Robo!"; Transliteration: "Shikkoku no Robo wo Kudake!" (Japanese: 漆黒のロボを砕け!)	September 4, 2000
Ruriko and Megumi have gone missing, and the Invader presence is growing rapidly. A.E.G.I.S has detected a large scale Invader threat focusing on the Political Thought Club rally at Tokyo Tower. With the Gate Robo loaded, the team races to the rescue once again. Shun will soon discover that his gate power is no match for the emotional pain he is faced with when he reaches the top of the tower. His mind his filled with the sorrowful memories of Shadow's past. Learn the true identity of the Gate Keeper's nemesis, and the reason for the dark path he has chosen.
23	"Call Forth the Courage to Fight!"; Transliteration: "Tatakau Yûki Wofurishibore!" (Japanese: 戦う勇気をふりしぼれ!)	September 11, 2000
With the A.E.G.I.S. base in total ruin, and the gate robot out of commission, there is little hope for Shun and the others to overcome Shadow's power. To make matters worse, the New York Headquarters has decided to abandon the Far-East Branch with the hopes that its sacrifice will prevent further destruction. Shun and the others seek save haven in the only place they can repair the gate robot, Shun's father's workshop. Without a gate engine, the robot is totally useless. A startling discover pushes Shun to learn about the circumstances of his father's death. The truth of his past may be the only hope that the Gate Keepers may have to win.
24	"For the Smiles of Tomorrow"; Transliteration: "Asu no Egao no Tame ni" (Japanese: 明日の笑顔のために)	September 18, 2000
The final barrier to Ruriko's heart has been broken, producing the Black Minus Gate of Massacre. A life of trying to become something other than the Runny-nosed Rurippe has with it a pain that she cannot mask. With Shadow holding the country in the palm of his hands, Shun will make one final attempt to redeem himself for all that has been done to his family and friends. As the team races to their final battle there are many surprises that reveal themselves on their path to the ultimate conflict. Old friends return to help, and hidden talents come to bear. No matter the outcome, victory or defeat will leave a bitter taste. The last chapter of Gate Keepers will be one to remember!
