= Shanghai Jiaotong Guangbo =

Traffic radio station in Shanghai, China

Shanghai Jiaotong Guangbo (Chinese: 上海交通广播; lit. 'Shanghai Transport Radio Station') is a traffic radio station in Shanghai in the People's Republic of China, broadcasting at both 105.7 FM and 648 AM. The radio station is part of the Radio and Television Station of Shanghai, whose programmes are made by SMG Radio Centre.

According to the website, this station particularly gives information regarding gas station prices and the state of the Shanghai transportation infrastructure. Broadcasts are repeated every half-hour. Towards the evening, flight conditions are reported.

In the evening, this radio station is a rebroadcast of Shanghai TV news.
