= List of UFO Baby episodes =

This is a list of episodes for the anime television series UFO Baby. The series was adapted from a manga series of the same title by Mika Kawamura that was serialized by Kodansha in Nakayoshi between February 1998 and March 2002, and collected in nine bound volumes.

The television series was produced by NHK, animated by J.C.Staff, and directed by Hiroaki Sakurai. It was broadcast in 78 episodes between March 28, 2000, and February 26, 2002, on NHK's BS2 broadcast satellite network. It was later rebroadcast by Animax, who translated and dubbed the series into English and numerous other languages for broadcast across its respective networks worldwide, including Hong Kong, Taiwan, Southeast Asia, South Asia. The anime concluded before the manga did, resulting in different endings for each series.

== Season 1 ==
No.	Title
1	"Suddenly four people" Transliteration: "Ikinari Yonri Kazoku?!" (Japanese: いきなり4人家族?!)
Miyu Kōzuki's parents had moved to the United States to work for NASA. Miyu has been told she is to live with her parents' old friend. She arrives, and it turns out to be a Buddhist temple. She meets her parents' friend, the temple monk, Hoshou Saionji, and his teenaged son, Kanata. The monk soon leaves for India for religious training, leaving Miyu behind with Kanata. Shortly after, a UFO flies into the house, and inside were an alien baby called Ruu and a "sitter-pet" called Wanya. They all then decide to live in the temple together. Kanata peeps at Miyu while she is showering, just as Miyu has seen him changing.
2	"Ruu-kun's is going to climb a stovepipe" Transliteration: "Rū-kun entotsu ni noboru" (Japanese: ルゥくん煙突に登る)
It is Miyu's first day at her new school. She finds out that Kanata has a fan club, and he is the class president. Miyu meets Christine Hanakomachi, a half-French girl who fancies Kanata. During class, Miyu spots Ruu flying outside. Kanata and Miyu chase after Ruu. Ruu ends up climbing a stovepipe, forcing Kanata and Miyu to climb it too.
3	"Chris and her friends drop by" Transliteration: "Kurisu tachi ga yattekita" (Japanese: クリス達がやって来た)
Chris and her friends came by Kanata's house to have a welcome party for Miyu. But their home turned out to be a disaster. They needed to take down floating items and hide Ruu and Wanya from their guests. Chris misunderstands Miyu and Kanata's relationship, after they discover Ruu.
4	"Momoka and the necklace" Transliteration: "Momoka to nekkuresu" (Japanese: ももかとネックレス)
Kanata and Miyu both go out with their friends. Before Miyu leaves, she notices that her necklace is missing. A crow has taken it. But 3 year-old Momoka chases the crow away and retrieves the necklace. While shopping for dinner, Wanya loses Ruu. Ruu finds Momoka with the necklace. They both are together, when finally Kanata and Miyu find Momoka and Ruu. Momoka starts referring to Ruu as her boyfriend.
5	"Miyu's awful cuisine" Transliteration: "Miyu no ryōri wa shippai!?" (Japanese: 未夢の料理は失敗!?)
Miyu wins two tickets to Momoland. After making her feel bad, Wanya and Ruu go to Momonland, leaving Miyu and Kanata home together. This makes Miyu nervous since it was the first time. They both go to the store to buy dinner. Kanata admits that he loves pumpkin after Miyu gets mad at him and shouts that he tell her what he liked, so Miyu insists that she cooks pumpkin dinner for him. There was only one problem, she never cooked pumpkin before. So, they both make a pumpkin dinner together. After dinner, a mysterious astronaut had arrived at Kanata's house. It turned out to be Miyu's mom.
6	"Mama comes over on Mother's Day"; Transliteration: "Haha no hi ni Mama kuru" (Japanese: 母の日にママ来る)
It is Mother's day, and Miyu's mom has come over to the Saionji home. She has the new invention from NASA, that detects extra-terrestrial objects. So Miyu and Kanata have to hide Ruu and Wanya. Miyu tells her mom that she is too busy searching for extra-terrestrials, and that it is more important than her. Miyu's mom asks her if Miyu would go to America with her. Miyu refuses. They soon find out that Miyu's mom had skipped an important meeting just to see Miyu.
7	"Ruu-kun, popular in school" Transliteration: "Rū-kun gakkō de ninkimono" (Japanese: ルゥくん学校で人気者)
As Miyu packs her things for cooking class, Ruu jumps in her bag. When it was cooking class, she noticed that Ruu was inside. Miyu tries to hide him, but can't. Everyone adores him. Aya finds an idea for drama competition where Kanata, Miyu and Ruu are the main characters.
8	"Ruu-kun's acting debut" Transliteration: "Rū-kun shuyaku de hatsu butai" (Japanese: ルゥくん主役で初舞台)
Miyu, Kanata, and Ruu practice in the drama competition. Miyu struggles to get her lines right. On the day of the competition, she does well. At the climax, Ruu uses his psychic powers to get everyone up to the "Lady Of The Moon" after Miyu trips.
9	"A date in the park between cousins" Transliteration: "Itoko dōshi kōen dēto" (Japanese: いとこ同士公園デート)
Ruu and Momoka go on a date, but are chaperoned by Miyu and Kanata. Little did they know, Momoka brought another chaperone, Chris. They soon found out that Chris is Momoka's cousin. While chaperoning, Wanya brings a toy called "mini mini setto" that was delivered from the planet Chuuhan. The mini mini setto shrinks Miyu, Kanata, and Chris. They struggle to push the button, but only succeed since Chris gets angry after seeing Miyu and Kanata's hands together. Miyu and Kanata convince Chris that it was a dream.
10	"Playing with spaced-out santa" Transliteration: "Santa bō to asobareru" (Japanese: 三太ボーっと遊ばれる)
Santa meets Okada, the person in charge of pictures in the newspaper. Miyu notices that Santa has been thinking about her lately. Miyu tries to get Santa to confess to Okada. However, at the track and field competition, Miyu finds out that Santa is only interested in the camera and does not like Okada.
11	"June, on Father's day... Papa comes" Transliteration: "Roku-gatsu chichi no hi Papa kuru" (Japanese: 六月父の日パパ来る)
Miyu's Papa comes to Japan and stays at the temple. Miyu and Kanata have to hide Ruu and Wanya from him. They soon find out that Papa was having a fight with Miyu's Mama. Kanata and Miyu try to convince Papa to go back to America, but fail. Papa and Mama communicate through their laptops. Kanata realizes that she was in Japan and they go find her. Once they find her, they solve their problems. Miyu and Kanata find out that they fought because Mama ate all the umeboshi.
12	"The mysterious boy, Yaboshi Seiya"; Transliteration: "Nazo no shōnen Yaboshi Seiya" (Japanese: 謎の少年·夜星星矢)
Miyu meets a boy named Yaboshi Seiya who has been stalking her. He tells her that he wants to talk to her alone. When they meet in front of the supermarket, Yaboshi says he wants to meet the alien living in their house. Miyu was shocked and decided to hide Ruu from Yaboshi Seiya without Kanata after he accused her. They soon found out that Yaboshi Seiya was also an alien from another planet called Sharaku.
13	"The mysterious planet Sharaku"; Transliteration: "Sharaku-sei wa nazo no hoshi" (Japanese: シャラク星は謎の星)
Yaboshi visits Kanata's house. They all find out that Yaboshi is an alien from planet Sharaku. Yaboshi attempts to take Ruu and Wayna, while knocking out Miyu and Kanata, back to his planet for three days. However, three days at his planet is half a year on Earth.Ruu gets angry and uses his powers to damage the UFO. They hear that the UFO crashed on a mountain, so they all rush to rescue Ruu and Wanya.
14	"Help!! transforming Wannya!"; Transliteration: "Tasukete henshin Wannyā" (Japanese: 助けて変身ワンニャー)
Wanya has a hard time controlling his transforming. He's been transforming into random things, due to not using the "sitter-pet shampoo". Miyu and Kanata search for Wanya, but keeps missing him. Ruu finally finds Wanya and washes him in the special shampoo.
15	"Mikan ran away, Saionji!"; Transliteration: "Mikan nigeta-yo Saionji" (Japanese: みかん逃げたよ西遠寺)
Mikan comes over the Saionji's home. Mikan explains that the new chief editor has been bothering her and was on the verge of not making the deadline for her manga. When she's working on her drawings, she accidentally spills the ink. Miyu and Kanata help her finish her manga.
16	"The ocean and the Lover's Tree"; Transliteration: "Umi to koibito-tachi no ki" (Japanese: 海と恋人達の木)
Everyone goes to the beach. Mikan finds the "Lover's Tree". She explains that when you kiss someone under the tree on night of an eclipse, you will be with that person forever. It just so happens, that day would have a lunar eclipse. Mikan falls in love with Wanya transformed. Mikan tries to confess to Wanya, but Chris interrupts. She lifts a tree and it almost falls on Miyu. Kanata saves her, but Miyu accidentally kisses him on the cheek.
17	"Is Hosho in India? Saionji"; Transliteration: "Hōshō Indo ka Saionji" (Japanese: 宝晶インドか西遠寺)
Kanata has a dream that his father was calling him for help. They do not think of it as a big deal. They soon find out that Kanata's father had gone missing in India. One night, Kanata's father comes back to the temple. In the backyard, they find a "dimensional chasm" that takes them to India. They meet a woman named Ku Shahara who has turned Kanata's father into stone when the portal is closing.
18	"Momoka's passport" Transliteration: "Momoka no pasupōto" (Japanese: ももかのパスポート)
Everyone goes to a festival. Momoka finds out that Ruu can fly after witnessing him retrieve a balloon. She then finds out that Wanya can transform and also fly. Miyu and Kanata find out that Momoka knows their secret and gives her the "Passport of Love", signifying that she likes Ruu and she will keep their secret.
19	"Miyu's real home-The mysterious house?" Transliteration: "Miyu no jikka wa nazo-na ie?" (Japanese: 未夢の実家は謎な家?)
Miyu gets a letter from her parents telling her to visit their old home. More people came than expected. When they got to the home, they realized that the house was cleaner than when Miyu and her parents were living in it. She thinks someone is in the house. They find out that it's an alien named Souji from planet Osouji was cleaning up their home.
20	"The off-Season home visit" Transliteration: "Kisetsu hazure no katei hōmon" (Japanese: 季節外れの家庭訪問)
Miyu and Kanata's sensei tells them that she will be having a home visit with them. When sensei goes over, she suspects that Kanata's father does not live with them. Mikan arrives in time to help them and persuades Sensei that they do not live alone.
21	"The principle reconciles with Monkichi"; Transliteration: "Kōchō Monkichi nakanaori" (Japanese: 校長·モン吉仲直り)
Everyone finds their precious things ruined. They soon find out that Monkichi, the principal's former pet monkey, was the culprit. Chasing after Monkichi, everyone gets sucked in dimensional warps. Chasing each other from warp to warp, Monkichi finally realizes that the principal is the owner he remembered years ago.
22	"The hike of fear" Transliteration: "Kyōfu no haikingu" (Japanese: 恐怖のハイキング)
Miyu, Kanata, and their classmates go to hiking. On their hike, they take the wrong path and get lost. Santa tells them ghost stories about lost hikers. They stay at a lounge and find that Wanya had accidentally transformed into the ghost. Ruu meets a "fairy-like" creature, and finds out that she has been scaring the people hiking.
23	"Everyone, gather at Saionji"; Transliteration: "Minna atsumare Saionji" (Japanese: みんな集まれ西遠寺)
Miyu and Kanata have a pajama party. Wanya was sent away to MomonLand, but returns to the house because it was closed. Miyu and Kanata have to hide Wanya and Ruu from their friends.
24	"The blackout Halloween"; Transliteration: "Teiden harowin" (Japanese: 停電ハロウィン)
It's Halloween and everyone is getting ready for the costume contest. However, the Saionji house has a blackout. Miyu finds a baby diary that Kanata's mother wrote in. It seems that she was a very nice person.
25	"With Ruu-kun at the department store" Transliteration: "Rū-kun to depāto de" (Japanese: ルゥくんとデパートで)
Ruu has had a bad dream of Miyu and Kanata fighting. When Kanata and Miyu take Ruu to the department store, Ruu does everything to prevent them from fighting. But finally, at one point they do begin fighting, so Ruu used his powers to stick them together. Throughout the day, Ruu lets Kanata and Miyu understand why he stuck them together, and when they finally realize it and apologize, Ruu lets them apart.
26	"Yaboshi Seiya's warning" Transliteration: "Yaboshi Seiya kara no shirase" (Japanese: 夜星星矢からの知らせ)
Miyu starts to worry that Ruu will not be able to go back to planet Otto because their bond is too strong. Seiya comes back to Earth to warn them that it might happen because there might be a connection to planet Otto's rescue team. Ruu's UFO connects to these two people.
27	"A correspondence with Ruu's parents" Transliteration: "Papa to Mama kara no tsūshin" (Japanese: パパとママからの通信)
The UFO disconnects. Miyu is still worried about what would happen when they come to pick Ruu up. Seiya calculates that they could connect to Ruu's parents again. When the time comes, Ruu remembers that they are his parents as well as realising that Miyu and Kanata are only his "earth" parents.
28	"Sister comes to Saionji"; Transliteration: "Saionji ni shisutā kuru" (Japanese: 西遠寺にシスター来る)
A UFO comes to the Saionji home. Inside, is Seiya's elder sister, Yaboshi Rui. Rui has come to take Seiya home, but he refuses. Momoka and Ruu gets stuck in the UFO, and Seiya and Rui save them. Seiya finally agrees to go home.
29	"Nanami-chan and the mysterious tsukemonoishi" Transliteration: "Nanami to nazo no tsukemono ishi" (Japanese: ななみと謎の漬物石)
Nanami goes shopping with Miyu and Aya. She buys a necklace that suddenly speaks to her. It shows up when Nanami left it at home, and speaks to her, but no one else can hear it. Wanya figures out that the jewel that Nanami bought is a Jewel Alien. Wanya communicates with her and lets her free.
30	"Wannya Wannya"; Transliteration: "Wannyā Wannyā" (Japanese: ワンニャーワンニャー)
Wanya's grandfather, Ji-ji Wanya, had come to Earth. Ji-ji Wanya convinces Wanya that he is an excellent sitter-pet.
31	"The first Christmas with Saionji"; Transliteration: "Saionji to hatsu Kurisumasu" (Japanese: 西遠寺と初クリスマス)
It is Miyu's first Christmas at the Saionji household, and she finds out that Kanata has never celebrated Christmas–which also happens to be his birthday. He steadfastly refuses to do so for religious reasons, particularly because his father is a Buddhist monk. Hosho himself returns to Japan, and finds out that Wanya and Ruu are aliens. He tells Kanata that it is all right to celebrate Christmas, before leaving again for Tibet. Kanata and Miyu then celebrate Christmas with Ruu and Wannya.
32	"Chris's ski mansion" Transliteration: "Kurisu skī de bessō e" (Japanese: クリススキーで別荘へ)
Everyone goes to stay at Chris' mansion. They then go skiing, but Miyu does not know how. When skiing, a deer-like person pushes Miyu down the slope. Shikada, Chris' servant, was in a deer costume, so Chris thought it was him and kicked him out. They soon find out that it was Mikan that pushed Miyu down. Now, Chris must get Shikada back.
33	"Kanata's childhood friend" Transliteration: "Kanata no osananajimi" (Japanese: 彷徨の幼なじみ)
Kanata meets Kijoyu Akira, a childhood friend. Miyu gets jealous when she sees them together. Miyu eavesdrops and hears that Kanata would fulfill their promise and to meet him somewhere. It turns out that Kanats'a promise was a date with Akira. Miyu gets really jealous. Miyu gets invited to a date with Mizuki to fantasy park. By coincidence, everyone ends up at fantasy park on the same day.
34	"Kanata's promised date" Transliteration: "Kanata no yakusoku dēto" (Japanese: 彷徨の約束デート)
During her date with Mizuki, Miyu tries to avoid bumping into Kanata. Chris, Ruu, Momoka and Wanya went to Fantasy Park also. They all avoid seeing each other. However, everyone meets eventually.Akira then finds out the feelings of the pair.
35	"Bye bye Wannya"; Transliteration: "Sayonara Wannyā" (Japanese: さよならワンニャー)
Miyu and Kanata plan a birthday party for Wanya. They decide to invite only people who know their secret, which is only Momoka. Kanata and Miyu try to hide the party secret from Wanya. Wanya thinks it is because he is a nuisance so they do not want him to hear. A dimensional chasm had appeared in the temple and Wanya decides to analyze it. He jumps in the dimensional chasm. He goes through many chasms. Eventually, Wanya returns to Earth.
36	"The Heiomachi onsen excursion" Transliteration: "Heio-machi onsen tankentai" (Japanese: 平尾町温泉探検隊)
Santa, Miyu and Kanata go to an onsen, or hot spring, at the top of the mountain. However, Miyu did not know that they have to dig up their own onsen. A monkey seals Miyu's bag so she chases after it to get it. She accidentally falls over the cliff and hurts her arm. Kanata jumps off after her.They share memories while they are waiting for Santa to get help, when Chris shows up.
37	"Miyu's idol debut" Transliteration: "Miyu no aidoru debyū" (Japanese: 未夢のアイドルデビュー)
Miyu was broadcast on T.V. and the next day at school, people asked for autographs and she received a lot of fan mail. Miyu receives an offer to be regular on Kids News. On the camera test for Miyu, she gets really nervous. She realizes that she really enjoys raising Ruu and that she will not have time for him if she gets in the entertainment business, so she turns down the offer. Kanata arrives to ask her to come home but then accompanies her home.
38	"Ruu-kun has multiplied" Transliteration: "Rū-kun fuechatta" (Japanese: ルゥくん増えちゃった)
Ruu suddenly begins to multiply. Kanata and Miyu are having a hard time controlling all the Ruus. They must keep all 100 Ruus together in order for Ruu to go back to normal. One of the Ruus escape the temple room. Chris spots the missing Ruu, but two aliens, Kyyui and Lava, kidnapped the missing Ruu. Chris chases after the two aliens and find their UFO. The UFO lights up.
39	"All 100 Ruu-kuns, gather!" Transliteration: "Hyakunin Rū-kun zen-in shūgō" (Japanese: 百人ルゥくん全員集合)
Miyu and Kanata went out to find the missing Ruu, while Momoka and Wanya stay home trying to keep the other 99 Ruus from escaping. Seiya and Rui return to Earth. Kanata and Miyu find out that they can contact the Space Police Force and stop the aliens from getting away. Kanata and Miyu decide to let out all the Ruus because they will lead them to the kidnapped Ruu. They explain to the aliens that he has 100 multiplication sickness. they conclude that they will catch it and run away. They finally have all 100 Ruus and Ruu goes back to normal.

== Season 2 ==
No.	Title
40	"Kanata's Rival Appears?"; Transliteration: "Kanata no raibaru tōjō?" (Japanese: 彷徨のライバル登場?)
Miyu runs into this boy named Nozomu Hikarigaoka, and soon finds out that he is a new student at their school. Miyu believes that he is an alien, so she investigates. They then find out that Hikarigaoka wants to become Kanata's rival. Miyu no longer believes that Hikarigaoka is an alien.
41	"Kanata and Nozomu's Showdown"; Transliteration: "Kanata to Nozomu no dai kessen" (Japanese: 彷徨と望の大決戦)
Hikarigaoka challenges Kanata to the bishōnen contest; Kanata was the previous year's winner. Hikarigaoka notices that Kanata's official photo for the contest is terrible, so he decides to take a better one but to no avail. One day while walking home Kanata spots Mikan wandering the streets for creative inspiration. Hikarigaoka gets a picture that apparently shows Kannata shoving Mikan to the ground. The picture is submitted in the contest and everyone does not vote for him. Miyu convinces the girls that it was a misunderstanding and Kanata wins the contest for the second time in a row.
42	"Where Is Okame-chan?"; Transliteration: "Okame-chan wa doko?" (Japanese: オカメちゃんはどこ?)
Hikarigaoka finds that Okame, his pet cockatoo, is missing. Everyone sets out to find Okame. While Momoka was collecting trash, she found Okame. Momoka overhears how Hikarigaoka treats Okame, so she decides to hide Okame. Hikarigaoka gets a lead of Okame's location, and Okame shows herself. Momoka is sad because Okame chose Hikarigaoka over her.
43	"The Family Assemble At Saionji"; Transliteration: "Ryōke sorotte Saionji" (Japanese: 両家そろって西遠寺)
Hosho returns to the Saionji temple, as do Miyu's parents. They visit Kanata's mother's grave. They share stories about her so Kanata would know more about his mother.
44	"Koinobori Aren't Scary"; Transliteration: "Koinobori wa kowakunai" (Japanese: 鯉のぼりは怖くない)
Kanata does not want to celebrate Children's Day because of a bad experience in the past. He saw a flying koinobori (carp kite), and it attacked him. His father had told him it was cursed, which it probably was not. Miyu and Kanata meet two aliens from planet Koinobori, who are looking for their mother.
45	"Cinderella Inside The Book"; Transliteration: "Ehon no naka de Shinderera" (Japanese: 絵本の中でシンデレラ)
Wanya bought a new product from a company from space and it was sent with a story book from the company, Miyu argued with Kanata and read the book after that, she then got sleepy and had a dream of Cinderella. All her friends was in the play and Miyu was playing the role of Cinderella. Kanata saw Miyu sleeping on the table and decided to give her a blanket, just then, Kanata was transformed into the prince too, he met Miyu and at last, they were going to marry each other and kissed each other (After serious talk about to make the play continue.) They then were awaken by Wanya and got all red.
46	"Chris And The White Whale"; Transliteration: "Kurisu to shiro-kujira" (Japanese: クリスと白クジラ)
Chris was playing a main role in a play for the drama competition. Wanya was spotted from Aya as a white whale. Aya decided that Wanya transformed into a white whale would play the other lead role. Chris gets nervous and starts falling in love with Wanya. Wanya misunderstands and think that he was to run away with Chris.
47	"Miyu And Mini-Miyu Go To School"; Transliteration: "Miyu to Mini-Miyu gakkō e" (Japanese: 未夢とミニ未夢学校へ)
Miyu is shrunk by Ruu's Mini-mini Machine. The batteries of the Mini-mini Machine are dead and the batteries that were ordered did not come yet. Wanya takes Miyu's place at school, but the real Miyu is seen. They convince their classmates that it is a machine made by NASA. A crow takes Miyu after flying out the window.
48	"Santa And Kanata's Weird Pot"; Transliteration: "Santa to Kanata no hen-na kame" (Japanese: 三太と彷徨の変なカメ)
Kanata and Santa decide to find their time capsule which was buried 10 years ago and instead find the same one but Wanya says that it is a dangerous pot and to hide it somewhere so they distract Santa and take it to replace it with the real one.
49	"Mizuno Sensei's Mysterious Trip"; Transliteration: "Mizuno sensei nazo no odekake" (Japanese: 水野先生謎のお出かけ)
Miyu and the others notice that Mizuno-sensei has been acting weird. They decide to find out what happens to her and follow her to a mountain.
50	"Stop It, Lazy Wannya"; Transliteration: "Yamete dare-Wannyā" (Japanese: やめてダレワンニャー)
One night, Wannya eats mouldy dango. The next morning he becomes really lazy. Seiya comes and finds out that Wannya infected by mold disease. Thus, he becomes listless. Seiya goes to another planet to find the cure.
51	"Mikan-san's Mysterious Promise"; Transliteration: "Mikan-san no nazo-na yakusoku" (Japanese: みかんさんの謎な約束)
Miyu and Kanata find out that Mikan has made a promise to a childhood friend that in 20 years she would meet him at a plaza. Mikan has been looking all over for him. Once they meet, they both agree that they both do not want to get married yet.
52	"Saionji's Ghost Stories And The Mysterious Koishi Stones"; Transliteration: "Saionji no kaidan koishi-iwa" (Japanese: 西遠寺の怪談コイシ岩)
Hosho tells Kanata not to move the Koishi stones because it will release the spirits that were sealed in it. Everyone comes over to the Saionji Temple for a Kimodameshi, a gathering to see who has the most courage. At the Kimodameshi, Santa tells ghost stories to scare everyone. Wanya accidentally knocks over the Koishi stones, releasing spirits. Everyone does their best to fight off the spirits. They soon find out that a girl and the spirits were only looking for a love letter instead of scaring people.
53	"Miyu and Kanata go to America"; Transliteration: "Miyu to Kanata Amerika e" (Japanese: 未夢と彷徨アメリカへ)
Miyu and Kanata are invited to America from Miyu's parents. Chris finds out that everyone had gone to America, in Florida, so she decides to take a vacation there too. She invites everyone with her. However. Santa was left behind.
54	"Everyone But Santa Goes To America"; Transliteration: "Santa igai wa Amerika e" (Japanese: 三太以外はアメリカへ)
Santa is left alone in Japan. In Florida, everyone went to the beach. Professor Vincent, Miyu's mom and dad's professor had been chasing Wanya, Ruu, Miyu and Kanata because his detector version 3 detected an alien.
55	"The Weird Object That Seiya Left Behind"; Transliteration: "Seiya ga azuketa hen-na buttai" (Japanese: 星矢が預けた変な物体)
Seiya returns to the Saionji temple. He leaves a strange object that has been floating in outer space. It turns out to be a pet Daruma that Seiya had purposefully left behind. It has a memory card that records everything it sees or hears. Miyu and Kanata had told it their true feelings about each other.
56	"Mecha Wannya Attacks!"; Transliteration: "Meka-Wannyā Shūrai!" (Japanese: メカワンニャー襲来!)
The Waru Waru gang is back to try to kidnap Ruu to pay their debt. This time, they built a mechanical Wanya to take Ruu and they keep on failing to create one.
57	"Nozomu-kun Goes To The Dream World"; Transliteration: "Nozomu-kun yume no sekai e" (Japanese: 望くん夢の世界へ)
Hikarigaoka finds a seed which grows to be an alive flower. The flower sucks in people and lets them have the dream that they want. Hikarigaoka gets sucked in, and Miyu and Kanata have to save him before the flower withers.
58	"My Pet Is Number One?"; Transliteration: "Uchi no petto ga ichiban?" (Japanese: うちのペットが一番?)
Chris holds a contest to see who has the best pet. Miyu and Kanata win the contest using Wanya. However, Ruu is unhappy. So Kanata wins a toy from the crane machine, Pepo. It's alive and only listens to Ruu.
59	"Pepo, Luu, Wannya"; Transliteration: "Pepo Rū Wannyā" (Japanese: ペポルゥワンニャー)
Pepo causes trouble to the family. It eats a lot, and hurts people. Because of this, Wanya goes on strike after Miyu tell him that he fails as a sitter-pet. The delivery man comes back to take Pepo, but they decide to keep it.
60	"Mikan works at Saionji"; Transliteration: "Mikan no shigotoba Saionji" (Japanese: みかんの仕事場西遠寺)
Mikan is making a new manga series at the Saionji while having a new assistant to help her. However, she is clumsy but still has a dream to become a manga artist like Mikan.
61	"Miyu and Kanata's first kiss?" Transliteration: "Miyu to Kanata hatsu kissu?" (Japanese: 未夢と彷徨初キッス?)
Miyu notices Kanata acting weirdly. The gang then decides to investigate and finds an alien spirit that has been annoying Kanata since he was in Sixth grade. The spirit possesses Miyu and demands a kiss from Kanata. But Wanya comes in with special dumplings and convinces it to leave peacefully.
62	"Nagger Kabokichi, Saionji"; Transliteration: "Kogoto Kabokichi Saionji" (Japanese: 小言カボ吉西遠寺)
In the morning huge pumpkins grew and so a pumpkin man called Kabokichi from planet Tonus came to make use of them. That night the Waru Waru gang came to the garden and made a mess while trying to steal all the pumpkins and Kabokichi chased them away but Miyu and the others thought it was him so they were sad. Once they found out it was actually the Waru Waru gang they apologised to Kabokichi.
63	"Anyone here? The scary lodge" Transliteration: "Sansō kowai-na dare-ka iru?" (Japanese: 山荘怖いな誰かいる?)
Miyu and Kanata's friends all went to Ox Horn lodge. They found a room with a fireplace and settled down. But mostly everyone had to go to the bathroom but they also disappeared so Miyu and Kanata went to find them to find themselves falling down a pipe to where everyone else was and this boy who was in a room studying while helping everyone else. Chris-chan revealed that her family owned this lodge but they had not used it for a long time so they forgot about it. Shikada-san found them and said that this was the wrong lodge and he made a typo. So they went to Deer Horn lodge. Wanya, Miyu and Kanata discovered that the boy was an alien.
64	"Pen-friend comes" Transliteration: "Pen-furendo ga kuru-yo" (Japanese: ペンフレンドが来るよ)
Santa's friends notice how he is very anxious and 'lost in his own world'.They seem all worried for him.He is by himself mumbling stuff.While walking home he was almost under a big truck but Kanata held him back thus he was saved. When enquired by Kanata, Santa told about his pen friend living in Germany with whom he has been exchanging letters for years.He said that she would be coming to visit him which made him so anxious and confused.Santa kept Kanata in his own house the night before Akane chan's (his pen friend) arrival (for moral support). In the morning, whenever the doorbell rang Santa rushed to find everyone but Akane. To give his anxious mind rest he ran to the record shop, with Kanata running after him to stop him.During his absence Akane chan came by to find Santa gone. She then went to the Saionji temple where by chance she came in acquaintance with Miy, Momoka and (transformed) Wanya. Before Miyu could tell Kanata about her she left accompanied by Momoka and then finally for Heio Machi station. Santa came there and was recognized by her (due to the peculiar record he was holding). They had a short but nice conversation noticed by all(though secretly due to Aya's courtesy. Akane went back. They then continued mailing each other as always.
65	"How boring the invention is!" Transliteration: "Hatsumei nante tsumaranai" (Japanese: 発明なんてつまらない)
One morning Wanya and Miyu see that many utensils and instruments were missing from the kitchen.When they proceed towards the temple they find Kanata, Santa and Nozumo making a weird machine. The three boys explained that they were making a pumpkin related machine for a competition. The three boys were joined by Ruu and Wanya, their working hours left the girls especially Miyu quite lonely.On the day of competition the Waru Waru kidnapped Ruu which made Kanata worry. The girls came to rescue and Ruu was saved by Kristine's able efforts. Kanata then apologized to Miyu for all the solitude she endured.
66	"Rival friend, rival in love" Transliteration: "Raibaru tomodachi koigataki" (Japanese: ライバル友達恋がたき)
Wanya and Ruu goes to the market and meets a little girl named Kagome. Kagome follows Ruu home and confesses to him. Momoka comes over and gets jealous. Both of them goes in to a battle over him. The next day Kagome brings Ruu to her home. Momoka and Kagome still fight over him. They eventually make up and Kagome leaves Ruu to Momoka.
67	"Teru of Planet Sharaku comes" Transliteration: "Sharaku-sei no Teru kuru" (Japanese: シャラク星のテル来る)
An alien from planet sharaku named Teru comes in search of Rui. Rui lands next to his ship and she immediately begins fighting with him. Teru claims they are lovers while Rui denies it and continues to get annoyed. Miyu attempts to get Teru to leave Rui alone with the help of Momoka and convince him he's only bothering Rui. He leaves and when Rui finds out she seems disappointed and unhappy. Seiya visits after and says that they are going out and that their quarrels happen all the time, but they eventually make up. Miyu feels horrible for making Teru leave but eventually he returns and they make up.
68	"Wannya vs. Shikada-san"; Transliteration: "Wannyā tai Shikada-san" (Japanese: ワンニャー対鹿田さん)
Chris tries to think of a present to give Kanata but does not know what to give him. Shikada-san goes to Kanata temple to find out what Kanata likes but then he saw Wannya transform so Wannya pretends to be a robot. After a while Wannya goes jealous of him. In the end Wannya saves Ruu and Pepo from a crow and Shikada and Kanata from drowning.
69	"Odd Guava's love" Transliteration: "Hamidashi Guaba no koi" (Japanese: はみだしグアバの恋)
The Super Evil Club is planning to steal Ruu again by asking their little sister, Guaba, to gain Miyu and Kanata's trust and steal Ruu. But then she fell in love with Nozomu-kun. Miyu and her friends tries to make Nuzomu fall in love with her but then her sisters comes and ruins the plan.
70	"Momoka's Christmas"; Transliteration: "Momoka no Kurisumasu" (Japanese: ももかのクリスマス)
Chris comes and asks Kanata and Miyu for help because for christmas Momoka really wants to ride santa's slay but Chris can not make that happen. The gang tries to make that happen by making fake small buildings and slay. In the end Seiya comes with a flying slay and lets Momoka ride it with Kanata as Santa.
71	"It is auspicious with the Seven Deities of Good"; Transliteration: "Shichifukujin de omedetai" (Japanese: 七福神でおめでたい)
It's Chinese New Year. When Miyu, Kanata, Wanya and were going to have their new year dinner they suddenly hear the bell ring and find Kanata's dad hitting it. When they got back to the house they found one of the lucky gods eating their new year's food. After they got back from the shrine they suddenly found 5 more lucky gods. Then more people went to the temple came to the temple and Miyu, Kanata and Bow- Meow have trouble covering the truth. Then they finally find the 7th missing god and took him into the temple. In the end the find out that the 7 good luck gods were just tourists and they all went home.
72	"Miyu and matching kimonos" Transliteration: "Miyu to osoroi no kimono" (Japanese: 未夢とお揃いの着物)
Everyone Goes to the temple to see the Fireworks. Luu uses the fuel tank of the UFO and thinks it's a firework. Santa blowes it up and everything becomes weird. Everyone goes inside of the temple to hide and find out when you open one of the doors you go back in time! First were being chased by angry villagers that were being chased by a T-Rex. After all the running Miyu finds herself standing in front of Kanata's mom and tries to make Kanata to talk to her. In the end they all find each other in the temple in the present date.
73	"Miyu and kiddy Kanata"; Transliteration: "Miyu to okosama Kanata" (Japanese: 未夢とお子様彷徨)
The delivery of online ordered things came along a box of biscuits that can turn one into a baby. Kanata eats it accidentally and turns into a preteen. Later Chris invites everyone over shopping. While in the book store, Kanata turns into a toddler and loses Miyu. Miyu looks all over for Kanata, but Kanata finds Wanya, Ruu, and Momoka instead and becomes a baby. Kanata is brought home sleeping with scared Miyu right next to him. In the end, Miyu hugs baby Kanata crying, and Kanata is brought back to being himself.
74	"Good-bye, the bad team" Transliteration: "Sayonara Waruwaru-dan" (Japanese: さよならわるわる団)
Miyu and Kanata find weird aliens in the temple. They go to the super evil club's space ship, thinking it was them sending the aliens. The super evil club tries to tell them they are not doing something evil but Kanata and Miyu still think they are. Soon Luu and Pepo follow a fluffy alien to the super evil club's space ship with Momoka. Miyu, Kanata, Rui, Teru and Wanya goes to the space ship planning to arrest them but while they are doing this a dimensional cassom suddenly pops up and Pepo, Luu and Momoka get sucked in. In the end the super evil club becomes good by saving Ruu, Pepo and Momoka and they were allowed to go back to their home planet.
75	"Valentine's Day in Heio-machi"; Transliteration: "Heio-machi Barentain" (Japanese: 平尾町バレンタイン)
It is almost Valentine's day and Miyu's friends have found their own crushes. On the other hand, Miyu has no one. Chris invites all the girls over to her house to make chocolate. Miyu makes chocolate for Wanya, Kanata, Ruu, and Pepo. Later Pepo eats all of the chocolate she made. In the end Miyu buys chocolate for everyone.
76	"Ruu-kun is the leading role by a school festival" Transliteration: "Rū-kun shuyaku de bunkasai" (Japanese: ルゥくん主役で文化祭)
The class is having a musical. Ruu is the main character and the some friends come over to make the costumes. The next day working in class Chris asks if Miyu will go back home. Later Kanata gets a mail from his dad, Miyu gets a call home her mom, and Wanya gets a message from Planet Otto that they are all returning home. Late at night they all confess, but Miyu pretends to be happy. Tomorrow the musical starts and at the end of it Miyu crys into Kanata in front of Wanya, Ruu, and Pepo. Hikarigaoka kun finds out The family's secret.
77	"At the night of the full moon" Transliteration: "Mangetsu no yoru ni" (Japanese: 満月の夜に)
In the morning news, people come over to talk about Miyu's mom going to space. Kanata decides since they do not have much time left, they go to the carnival with Momoka. Hikarigaoka and everybody also finds out the secret. Inside the ferris wheel Kanata, Miyu, and Wanya tell Momoka that Wanya and Ruu is going back to space. Momoka and Ruu cry together while Ruu flies in the air. Miyu and Kanata tell the others about the secret. At home Wanya transforms and finds out about how Miyu and Kanata live together. Everyone has a little party, until the Waru Waru's UFO comes.
78	"See you again" Transliteration: "Mata aou-ne" (Japanese: また会おうね)
Everyone helps Ruu and everyone to save the rescue ship. After all the work, they save the ship and Ruu and Wanya go back to their home planet. Everything goes back to normal, Miyu went back to her home and went to boarding school etc. Kanata and Miyu got married and named their daughter Miu. Momoka rushed to Kanata's temple and see Miu, when Pepo came out of nowhere. Wanya and grown-up Ruu came to visit them.
