= Shanghai Television =

Chinese television station

Shanghai Television (Chinese: 上海电视台; pinyin: Shànghǎi Diànshìtái) was a TV station based in Shanghai, China that was founded in 1958. Its old web site address was www.stv.sh.cn. In 2001, it was merged with Radio Shanghai, Eastern Radio Shanghai, Oriental Television Station and Shanghai Cable Television under the name of Shanghai Media Group. It broadcast 258 hours of TV and 214 hours of radio on a daily basis (2005).

== Logo and title ==
The logo of Shanghai Television is the white magnolia, the city flower of Shanghai. In 1979, Deng Xiaoping wrote the name of Shanghai Television. On September 22, 1993, Jiang Zemin wrote the inscription for the 35th anniversary of the establishment of Shanghai Television: "Stability and encouragement, truth-seeking and innovation".

== History ==
In 1956, Chen Haotian, deputy director of Shanghai People's Broadcasting Station, and some engineering and technical cadres planned to establish a TV station in Shanghai, focusing on the research of TV broadcasting technology. On August 2, Miao Lichen, director of Shanghai Radio Station, and Chen Haotian, deputy director, jointly reported to the Shanghai Municipal Committee of the Chinese Communist Party, applying for the establishment of Shanghai TV Station. Later, on October 22, they wrote to the Central Broadcasting Bureau to apply for TV frequencies and proposed to design and manufacture TV transmission equipment by themselves. Later, it was shelved due to the Anti-Rightist Movement.

In March 1958, the Shanghai Municipal Committee of the Chinese Communist Party formally approved the establishment of Shanghai Television Station, which was initially affiliated with Shanghai Radio Station. In April of the same year, the Shanghai Television Station Preparatory Committee was established, and the New Yong'an Building on Nanjing East Road was selected as the station site. On October 1, 1958, Shanghai Television Station began trial broadcasts, and officially started broadcasting on October 1, 1959. In addition to news, literature, and movies, the program content also included social education columns, which were broadcast four times a week; on April 6, 1960, Shanghai Television Station and East China Normal University jointly tried to run Shanghai Television University, which had three majors: mathematics, physics, and chemistry. It was broadcast for three hours each on Monday, Wednesday, and Friday afternoons. As a result, Shanghai Television Station achieved daily program broadcasts.

In early 1960, Shanghai began to conduct color television experiments. The city's industrial department organized relevant factories and enterprises to carry out supporting trial production based on the drawings brought back from Beijing. In 1961, some of the color TV center equipment was installed on the 10th floor of the New Yong'an Building. In 1962, due to the adjustment of the national economic plan, the color TV project was suspended and resumed in the early 1970s. On March 9, 1971, with the approval of the Shanghai Municipal Committee of the Chinese Communist Party, it was agreed to build the Shanghai Color TV Center, and the site was selected at No. 651 Nanjing West Road (now the Radio and Television Building). On August 1, 1973, color television was officially broadcast to the outside world twice a week. In 1974, the Shanghai TV Color TV Center studio, transmitter room, microwave room and TV transmission tower were completed. In the same year, the Shanghai TV station moved to the Shanghai Color TV Center. In September 1975, Shanghai TV installed the second set of color TV center equipment, which was specially provided for the broadcast of self-produced color TV programs on Channel 5. As a result, Shanghai TV became the first provincial TV station in the country to equip all channels with color TV equipment.

After the outbreak of the Cultural Revolution, the programs of Shanghai TV were influenced by the Cultural Revolution at that time. The main content of the programs was changed to "struggle sessions", "big criticism" and "model operas". It was not until several months after Mao Zedong's death that the program was restored. At 17:09 on January 28, 1979, Shanghai TV broadcast an advertisement for "Shengui Yangrong Wine" of Shanghai Medicinal Materials Company. It was the first TV advertisement after the founding of the People's Republic of China (and the socialist country). However, the original clip has been lost, and only four frames remain. At 18:51 on March 15, 1979, Shanghai TV broadcast a Swiss Rado watch advertisement, which was the first foreign TV advertisement in mainland China.

In 1981, Shanghai TV added Channel 20, which started broadcasting on April 22 (after Shanghai Oriental TV was established on January 18, 1993, Channel 20 was assigned to Oriental TV and is now a city channel). On July 1, 1986, Shanghai TV officially launched Channel 26, replacing Channel 20 to broadcast educational programs (after Shanghai Educational TV was established in 1994, the channel was assigned to Educational TV). On October 1, 1989, Shanghai TV launched Channel 14, initially broadcasting China Central Television (CCTV)'s second educational program, and later changed to Shanghai TV's second self-produced program channel (later Xing Shang Channel).

In 1985, Shanghai TV signed an agreement with TV stations in seven cities, including Wuxi, Changzhou, Nanjing, Yangzhou and Nantong, to broadcast Shanghai TV programs through the Shanghai-Beijing microwave line. On July 1, 1986, the satellite ground receiving station of Shanghai TV was completed. Since then, the coverage of Shanghai TV has been continuously expanded. At the beginning, the coverage range extended to Lianyungang, Jiangsu in the north, Zhejiang and parts of Anhui in the west, northeastern Jiangxi in the south, and Zhoushan Islands and most areas of the Yangtze River Delta in the east, with a viewing population of more than 100 million.

From 1989 to 1999 (before the channels of Shanghai Cable TV were withdrawn and merged into Shanghai TV and Shanghai Oriental TV), Shanghai TV had two channels, Channel 8 and Channel 14. Channel 8 was the main channel, broadcasting news, finance, and social education programs, while Channel 14 mainly broadcast sports, literature, film and television dramas, and foreign language programs. On February 16, 1996, Shanghai TV and Shanghai Animation Film Studio merged to implement the "one team, two brands" policy.

In April 2000 and July 2001, Shanghai Satellite TV Center and Shanghai Cable TV were merged into Shanghai TV. Shanghai TV had seven channels with their own characteristics, broadcasting 137 hours of programs every day, including 27 hours of self-produced programs.

In 2003, Shanghai TV became Dragon Television.

== See also ==
- Shanghai Media Group
