= List of radio stations in Romania =

This is a list of radio stations broadcast in Romania.

== Radio stations ==
=== Public ===
- Radio România Actualități
- Radio România Cultural
- Radio România Muzical
- Radio Romania International
  - RRI 1
  - RRI 2
- Radio 3Net - "Florian Pittiş"
- Radio Antena Satelor
- Marosvásárhelyi Rádió
- Radio România Regional
  - Radio Antena Brașovului
  - Radio București
  - Radio Cluj
  - Radio Constanța
  - Radio Craiova
  - Radio Iași
  - Radio Mureș
  - Radio Reșița
  - Radio Sighet
  - Radio Timișoara
  - Radio Vacanța

=== Private ===
- BBC Romania - closed
- Pro FM Campus - closed
- Metronom FM Romania - closed
- Social FM
- City FM (Romania)|City FM
- Civic FM
- RFI România
- Deutsche Welle
- Digi FM
- Europa FM
- Info Pro- closed
- Jazz FM Romania
- Kiss FM (Romania)|Kiss FM
- Magic FM
- Radio Micul Samaritean - closed
- Mix FM - closed
- National FM
- News FM - closed
- OneFM - online
- Pro FM
- Pro FM Dance - closed
- Virgin Radio Romania (former Radio 21)
- Radio 21 Dance - closed
- Radio Deea - closed
- Radio Guerilla
- Radio Total - closed
- Radio Trinitas
- theRebel România - closed
- Romantic FM
- Smart Radio
- Student FM - closed
- Soft FM - closed
- Total Sport FM
- Vibe FM - closed
- Vocea Evangheliei
- Vocea Sperantei (publicly affiliated)
- Radio Vox T - closed
- Radio ZU
- FREY24 Romania - closed

=== Local ===
- EBS Radio (Cluj-Napoca),(Dej)

* Metronom FM (Râmnicu Vâlcea)

- Stil FM (Călăraşi and Oltenița)
- Orizont FM Medgidia (Medigidia)
- Radio Voces Campi (Călăraşi and Olteniţa)
- Radio Bărăgan (Călăraşi)
- Radio Campus (Buzău, Urziceni, Slobozia)
- Radio Orion (Feteşti)
- Radio 1 (Galaţi)
- Radio Prahova (Prahova county)
- Radio Romanaia Dance ([in Winamp in shoutcasta radio])
- Radio Constanța (Constanța)
- Radio Holiday (Constanța)
- Sky FM (Constanța)
- Social FM (Transylvania)
- West City Radio (Timişoara)
- Radio Stil / Stil FM (Dej)
- Doina FM (Neptun)
- Radio Star FM (Sebes-Alba)
- Radio X-ON (ORION) (Sebes-Alba)
- Super FM (Brașov)
