= Media in Constanța =

List of media outlets in Constanța, Romania

This is a list of television and radio stations along with a list of media outlets in and around Constanța, Romania including Constanța County.

== TV stations ==
Channel	Name	Network	Launch date	Notes
8	TVR 1	Romanian Public Television		Public channel
23	Prima TV Constanța	Prima TV	2008	Affiliated station
36	Neptun TV	None	1995	Local news channel
40	CTV	None	2007	Local news channel
42	TVR 2	Romanian Public Television		Public channel
47	Realitatea TV	Realitatea TV	2008	
50	Pro TV Constanţa	Pro TV	2005	Affiliated station
53	Național TV	Național TV	2006	
57	Antena 1 Constanţa	Antena 1	1994	Affiliated station
57	Disney Channel	Disney Channel	2009 (Replacing Jetix)	TV cartoons channels
45	Disney XD	Jetix Play	2010(Replacing Jetix Play)	TV cartoons channels

The cable providers in Constanța are RCS&RDS and UPC.

== Radio stations ==
=== Constanța stations ===
Frequency	Name	Launch date	Format	Notes
AM 909; FM 100.1	Radio Constanța / Radio Vacanța	1990/1967	Public / news - music	Regional station
FM 91.6	Play Radio	2023	Adult Contemporary	
FM 92.9	C FM	2008	Dance music	Airs syndicated mix shows nightly
FM 94.7; FM 97.1 Cernavodă; FM 98.9 Mangalia	Doina FM	1995	Commercial radio	
FM 95.9 Constanța	Sweet FM	2023	Dance Music	
FM 92.4 Constanța	Radio Trinitas	2006		
FM 101.1	Radio Sky	1993	Commercial radio	
FM 99.7	Radio Dobrogea	2005	Christian radio	

=== Other stations ===
Numerous radio stations outside Constanţa are also licensed to broadcast in the Constanța area.

Frequency	Name	Format	Network	Location
AM 1314	Radio Antena Satelor	Public radio	Romanian Radio Broadcasting Company	Bucharest
AM 1593	Radio România Cultural	Public radio / classical music	Romanian Radio Broadcasting Company	Bucharest
FM 88.5; FM 104.1 Mangalia; FM 105.2 Băneasa, Constanța	Virgin Radio	Commercial radio	Virgin Radio	Bucharest
FM 89.4; FM 97.4 Neptun	Magic FM	Commercial radio	Magic FM	Bucharest
FM 90.1; FM 87.8 Costinești; FM 107.1 Mangalia; FM 89.9 Medgidia; FM 96.2 Techirghiol; FM 93.9 Băneasa, Constanța; FM 92.0 Hârșova	PRO FM	Commercial radio	PRO FM	Bucharest
FM 91.1; FM 89 Mangalia; FM 98.5 Băneasa, Constanța	Kiss FM	Commercial radio	ProSiebenSat.1 Media	Bucharest
FM 94.2	Național FM	Commercial radio	Național FM	Bucharest
FM 97.8; FM 95.6 Cernavodă	Radio Guerrilla	Commercial radio	Radio Guerrilla	Bucharest
FM 98.2 Năvodari	Radio Itsy Bitsy	Children's radio	Radio Itsy Bitsy	Bucharest
FM 102.7; FM 106.6 Băneasa, Constanța	Radio România Actualități	Public radio	Romanian Radio Broadcasting Company	Bucharest
FM 103.5	Radio Vocea Speranței	Christian radio	Radio Vocea Speranței	Bucharest
FM 103.9	RockFM	Commercial radio / Classic Rock	ProSiebenSat.1 Media	Bucharest
FM 106.1	Europa FM	Commercial radio / news	Europa FM	Bucharest
FM 107.5; FM 100.6 Eforie Nord; FM 95.1 Medgidia; FM 90.6 Hârșova	Radio ZU	Commercial radio	Radio ZU	Bucharest

== Print ==
=== Newspapers and magazines ===
- Constanța 100% - CT100.ro
- CTnews / Constanța NEWS - ctnews.ro
- GoNEXT - gonext.ro
- Constanta Financiara
- Cuget Liber
- Constanta.ro - realitatea urbană de zi cu zi.
- Adolescentul
- Litoral
- Atac de Constanța
- Jurnalul de Constanța
- Replica de Constanța
- Ziua de Constanța
- Bună ziua Constanța
- Presa din Constanța - index presa
