= Media in Iași =

This is a list of television and radio stations along with a list of media outlets in and around Iași, Romania including the Iași County.

== TV stations ==
Channel	Name	Network	Launch date	Notes
6	TVR 2	Romanian Public Television		Public channel
9	TVR 1	Romanian Public Television		Public channel
24	Prima TV Iași	Prima TV	2008	Affiliated station
28	Tele M	None	1991	Local news channel
36	Antena 1 Iași	Antena 1	2006	Affiliated station
38	TV Bit	None	2000	Local news channel
44	Național TV Iași	Național TV	2006	Affiliated station
48, 51	Pro TV Iași	Pro TV	1999	Affiliated station
54	Iași TV Life	None	2009	Local news channel
59	TVR Iași	Romanian Public Television	1991	Regional station

The cable providers in Iași are Telekom Romania, Orange Romania, UPC Romania and Digi Romania.

== Radio ==
=== Iași stations ===
Frequency	Name	Launch date	Format	Notes
AM 1053	Radio Iași Classic	1941	public / news	Regional station
FM 105.0	Viva FM	2016	Commercial radio/News	
FM 94.9	Radio Hit	1994	Contemporary hit radio	
FM 96.3	Radio Iași FM	2007	public / Hot adult contemporary	Regional station

=== Other stations ===
Numerous radio stations outside Iași are also licensed to broadcast in the Iași area (Iași, Pașcani, Hârlău).

Frequency	Name	Format	Network	Location
FM 87.8 - Iași	PRO FM	Commercial radio	PRO FM	Bucharest
FM 88.4 - Iași; FM 107.4 - Hârlău; FM 103.9 - Pașcani	Impact FM	Commercial radio	Impact FM	Suceava; Bucharest - Radio ZU affiliated
FM 91.1 - Iași	Magic FM	Commercial radio	Magic FM	Bucharest
FM 91.9 - Iași; FM 87.6 - Hârlău	Kiss FM	Commercial radio	Kiss FM	Bucharest
FM 92.7 - Iași; FM 92.2 - Hârlău	Radio Trinitas	Christian radio	Radio Trinitas	Iași, Bucharest
AM 1485 - Iași; FM 94 - Hârlău	Radio Vocea Speranței	Christian radio	Radio Vocea Speranței	Bucharest
FM 97.9 - Iași	RFI Iași	Francophone news / talk	RFI România	Bucharest
FM 99.2 - Iași	~~Info Pro~~ Digi FM	Commercial radio / news	~~Info Pro~~ Digi FM	Bucharest
AM 1179; FM 101.1	Radio România Actualități	Public radio	Romanian Radio Broadcasting Company	Bucharest
FM 101.6 - Iași; FM 91.4 - Pașcani	~~Radio 21~~ Virgin Radio	Commercial radio	Radio 21	Bucharest
FM 102.7 - Pașcani	Favorit FM	Commercial radio	Favorit FM	Oradea
FM 103.1	Radio România Cultural	Public radio / classical music	Romanian Radio Broadcasting Company	Bucharest
FM 107.4 - Hârlău	Viva FM Iași	Commercial radio	Viva FM	Suceava
FM 105.3 - Hârlău	Radio ZU	Commercial radio	Radio ZU	Bucharest
FM 106.5 - Iași	Europa FM	Commercial radio / news	Europa FM	Bucharest

=== Former stations ===
Frequency	Name	Launch date	Format	Notes
FM 100.4	Radio Nord-Est	1994	Hot adult contemporary / news	Licence revoked in January 2016
FM 104; FM 102.2 - Pașcani	Vox T Radio	1990	Adult contemporary / Actual Based On	First independent non-public radio station in Romania outside Bucharest; Also operated local radio stations in various cities between 1996-2011; Closed down in November 2011

== Print ==
=== Newspapers ===
==== Regional dailies ====
- Evenimentul
- Monitorul
- Ziarul de Iași
- Sport Moldova
- Gazeta de Moldova

==== Local dailies ====
- 24 Ore
- Bună Ziua Iași
- Flacăra Iașului
- Jurnalul de Est
- Ziua de Iași

==== Free dailies ====
- Adevărul de seară
- Iași Plus

==== Alternative ====
- Cronica de Iași
- Curierul de Iași
- Ieșeanul
- Financiarul
- Metropolis
- Orizontul - Pașcani
- Ziarul Lumina

==== Student ====
- Opinia Studențească
- Gazeta de Moldova

==== Former newspapers ====
- Adevărul
- Constituționalul
- Cuvântul de Iași
- Contemporanul
- Der Wecker
- România literară
- Viața Românească
- Zimbrul și Vulturul

== Magazines ==
- Convorbiri Literare
- Cronica
- Dacia literară
- Timpul

== Book publishers ==
- Cermi
- Junimea
- Polirom
- Princeps Edit
- Timpul
- Adi Center

== Other ==
- Iași Invest
