= Moinești =

- Municipality
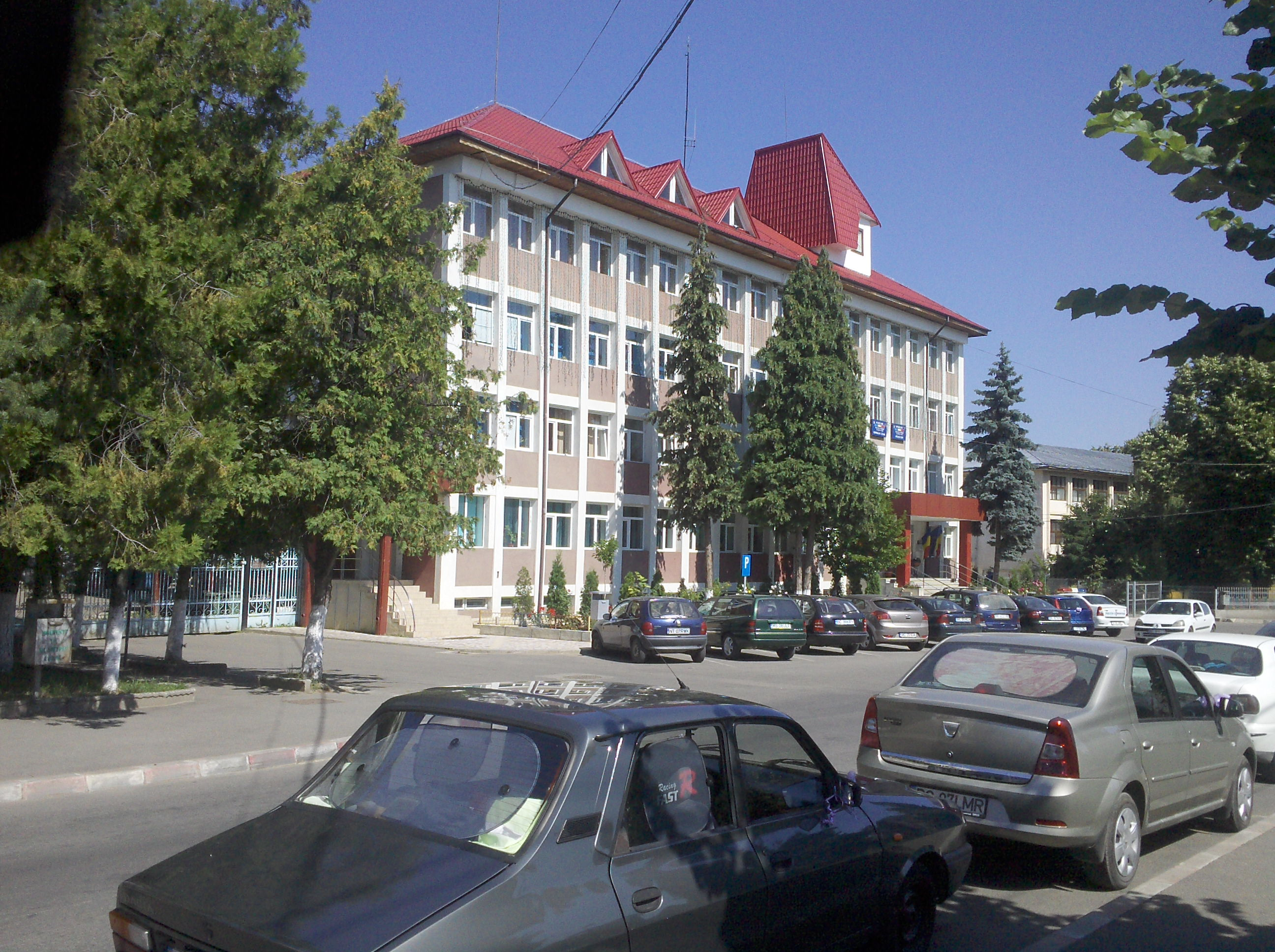
- Moinești City Hall

- Coat of arms

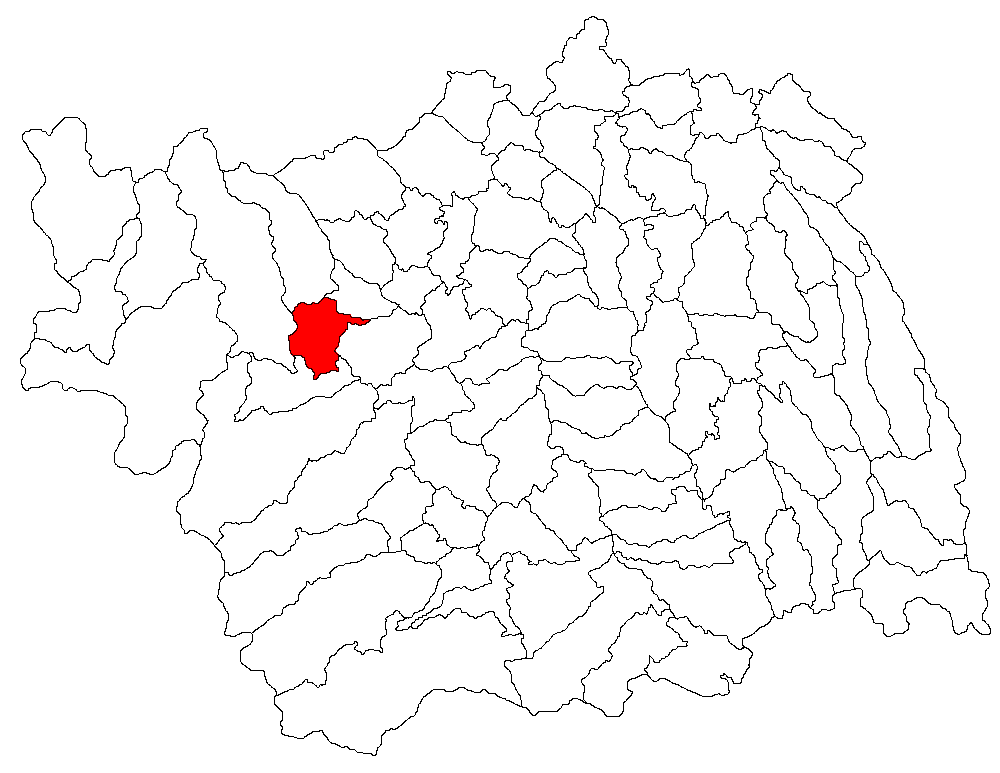
- Location in Bacău County

- Location in Romania
- Coordinates: 46°26′N 26°29′E
- Country: Romania
- County: Bacău

Government
  - Mayor (2024–2028): Valentin Vieru (PNL)
- Area: 45.83 km^{2} (17.70 sq mi)
- Elevation: 400 m (1,300 ft)
- Population (2021-12-01): 19,728
  - Density: 430.5/km^{2} (1,115/sq mi)
- Time zone: UTC+02:00 (EET)
  - Summer (DST): UTC+03:00 (EEST)
- Postal code: 605400
- Area code: (+40) 02 34
- Vehicle reg.: BC
- Website: www.moinesti.ro

Moinești (Romanian pronunciation: [mojˈneʃtʲ]; Hungarian: Mojnest) is a city in Bacău County, Western Moldavia, Romania, with a population of 19,728 as of 2021. Its name is derived from the Romanian-language word moină, which means "fallow" or "light rain". Moinești once had a large Jewish community, and in 1899 about half of the population was Jewish; in Jewish contexts the name is often given as Mojnescht or "Monesht". The city administers one village, Găzărie.

== History ==
First mentioned in 1467, the locality was listed among the Moldavian villages on the Bawer map of 1783. A târg was first attested in this location in 1832; it had 188 houses and 588 inhabitants.

In 1921, Moinești was designated a comună urbană ("urban commune"), with its own coat of arms and local administration, but a step short of being considered a city. It became a municipality in 2002. The 2011 census counted 20,855 inhabitants. At the 2021 census, the city had a population of 19,728.

There are two secondary schools in Moinești: the Spiru Haret Theoretical High School and the Grigore Cobălcescu Technical College.

== Economy ==
The area around Moinești is rich in natural resources such as petroleum, natural gas, salt, and timber. From the 1950s to the 1980s, Moinești experienced a steady economic growth thanks to the large petroleum extracting industry. After 1990, however, following the nationwide industry privatization, Moinești's economy changed dramatically, at some points reaching level of unemployment of over 20%.

== Geography ==
The city is situated in the foothills of the Tarcău Mountains, at an altitude of 400 m (1,300 ft), on the banks of the river Tazlăul Sărat. It is located in the northwestern part of Bacău County, 45 km (28 mi) west of the county seat, Bacău.

Moinești is crossed by national road DN2G, which connects it to Bacău (where it ends in DN2) and to nearby Comănești (where it ends in DN12A).

=== Hydrography ===
The hydrography of Moinești is made from small rivers and streams that are part of the Siret River basin. The most important river near the town is Tazlău River, which passes close and takes water from many smaller streams. In spring time the water level is higher because of rain and melting snow, and in summer it becomes smaller.

=== Climate ===
Moinești has a warm-summer humid continental climate (Köppen: Dfb) with transitional characteristics typical of the Subcarpathian region, influenced by its location between the Tazlău Subcarpathian Depression and the Comănești intramontane depression. Summers are generally warm, while winters are cold, with January being the coldest month and July the warmest. Precipitation occurs throughout the year, with the highest amounts generally recorded in late spring and early summer. The mean annual temperature is around 8 °C and annual precipitation totals approximatively 655 mm.

The highest temperature recorded at Moinești is 37 °C (99 °F) on 10 July 1980, while the lowest is −27.1 °C (−16.8 °F) on 18 January 1963.

Climate data for Moinești (1991–2020)
Month	Jan	Feb	Mar	Apr	May	Jun	Jul	Aug	Sep	Oct	Nov	Dec	Year
Mean daily maximum °C (°F)	0.3 (32.5)	2.3 (36.1)	7.3 (45.1)	13.4 (56.1)	18.7 (65.7)	22.0 (71.6)	24.0 (75.2)	23.7 (74.7)	18.8 (65.8)	13.0 (55.4)	7.5 (45.5)	2.1 (35.8)	12.8 (55.0)
Daily mean °C (°F)	−4.0 (24.8)	−2.3 (27.9)	2.1 (35.8)	8.3 (46.9)	13.8 (56.8)	17.5 (63.5)	19.4 (66.9)	19.0 (66.2)	14.1 (57.4)	8.2 (46.8)	3.2 (37.8)	−2.0 (28.4)	8.1 (46.6)
Mean daily minimum °C (°F)	−8.1 (17.4)	−6.6 (20.1)	−2.9 (26.8)	2.5 (36.5)	8.1 (46.6)	12.1 (53.8)	14.0 (57.2)	13.8 (56.8)	9.3 (48.7)	3.8 (38.8)	−0.2 (31.6)	−5.5 (22.1)	3.4 (38.1)
Average rainfall mm (inches)	39 (1.5)	39 (1.5)	59 (2.3)	80 (3.1)	107 (4.2)	127 (5.0)	126 (5.0)	91 (3.6)	69 (2.7)	59 (2.3)	43 (1.7)	46 (1.8)	885 (34.8)
Average rainy days	6	6	9	10	11	12	11	9	7	6	5	6	98
Average relative humidity (%)	81	78	74	70	70	72	72	71	74	78	82	80	75
Source: climate-data.org

== Demography ==
According to the 2021 census, the population of the municipality of Moinești amounts to 19,728 inhabitants, a decrease compared to the previous census in 2011, when 21,787 inhabitants were recorded. The majority of residents are Romanian (82.57%), with a Roma minority (2.6%), while for 14.62% ethnic affiliation is unknown. From a religious standpoint, the majority of the inhabitants are Orthodox (79.07%), with minorities of Roman Catholics (3.4%) and Pentecostals (1.5%), while for 15.26% the religious affiliation is unknown.

Ethnic composition of Moinești
1. Romanians (82.6%)
2. Roma (2.60%)
3. Other ethnic groups (0.21%)
4. Unknown (14.6%)

Historical population
Year	Pop.	±%
1930	6,616	—
1948	5,868	−11.3%
1956	12,934	+120.4%
1966	18,714	+44.7%
1977	20,862	+11.5%
1992	25,560	+22.5%
2002	25,532	−0.1%
2011	21,787	−14.7%
2021	19,728	−9.5%
Source: Census data

Religious composition of Moinești
1. Orthodox (79.1%)
2. Roman-Catholic (3.40%)
3. Pentecostal (1.50%)
4. Other religions (0.78%)
5. Unknown (15.3%)

== Dada monument ==
In 1996, a monument was built in the town in honor of Tristan Tzara, the Moinești-born founder of Dadaism. It was created from concrete and steel by the German-Romanian sculptor Ingo Glass. It is 25 meters long, 2.6 meters wide, and 10 meters high and it weighs 120 tons.

== Tourism ==
Tourist attractions in Moinești include: Băi Park (with healing mineral waters), Pine Tree Park, Ghindaru Hill (where archaeologists discovered artefacts of the pre-Cucuteni culture, over 5,000 years old), the Dada Monument (dedicated to Tristan Tzara), Cetățuia (Dacian fortified city archaeologically certified), and the Jewish Cemetery (where the oldest tombstone with recognisable text dates back to 1692).

== Media and communications ==
Moinești is served by several radio stations, primarily from the nearby town of Comănești. The most prominent local station is Moinești FM, which offers a mix of pop, dance, and Top 40 music. Additionally, Radio Trinitas broadcasts in the area on 99.8 MHz from Dealul Osoiu, where a cross landmark is located, providing religious content. Comănești hosts several national stations that also reach Moinești. These include, Antena Satelor (89.0 MHz), Radio ZU (90.3 MHz), Europa FM (106.3 MHz), Virgin Radio (91.6 MHz), Digi FM (98.5 MHz), Radio Romania Cultural (101.4 MHz), Radio Romania Actualitati (104.7 MHz), and National FM (95.1 MHz). These stations offer a variety of programming, such as contemporary music, news, and talk shows.

== People ==
- Alexandru Barna (born 1993), footballer
- Robert Căruță (born 1996), footballer
- Lăcrămioara Filip (born 1973), gymnast
- Vasile Gherasim (1950–2020), politician
- Alexandru Margină (born 1993), footballer
- Nestor Rateș (1933-2024), journalist, Head of Romanian Desk of Radio Free Europe 1989, 1994–2002
- Moses Rosen (1912–1994), Chief Rabbi of Romania from 1948 to 1994
- Iancu Solomon (1918–1940), Romanian soldier
- Moshe David Shuv (1854–1938), born Moșe David Iancovici, early Zionist and founder of Rosh Pinna
- Tristan Tzara (1896–1963), writer and founder of Dada
