= Radio Cluj =

Coordinates: 46°46′07″N 23°32′53″E

Radio România Cluj
- Cluj; Romania
- Broadcast area: Cluj

Programming
- Affiliations: EBU-UER

Ownership
- Owner: Romanian Radio Broadcasting Company
- Sister stations: RRC, R3N, RRM, RAS, RRI

Links
- Webcast: http://radiocluj.ro/asculta-live/
- Website: http://radiocluj.ro/

Radio Cluj is a Romanian public radio station from Cluj-Napoca, broadcasting throughout Transylvania. It features Romanian and Hungarian language programmes.
