= Radio România Regional =

The logo of the regional network

Radio România Regional is the national network of regional state owned radio stations in Romania.

These are, as follows:

- Radio București FM
- Radio România Brașov FM
- Radio Cluj
- Radio Constanța
- Radio Iași
- Radio Oltenia Craiova
- Radio Târgu Mureș
- Radio Reșița
- Radio Timișoara
- Radio Vacanța

Radio România Regional Network is part of the Romanian Radio Broadcasting Company, which operates as an autonomous public service of national interest, editorially independent.
