= Radio Reșița =

Radio România Reșița

Programming
- Affiliations: EBU-UER

Ownership
- Owner: Romanian Radio Broadcasting Company
- Sister stations: RRC, R3N, RRM, RAS, RRI

Links
- Webcast: http://radioresita.ro/radio-online
- Website: http://radioresita.ro/

Radio Reșița is a Romanian regional public radio station from Reșița.
