= Radio Constanța =

Radio România Constanța

Constanța; Romania
- Broadcast area: Constanța, România

Programming
- Affiliations: EBU-UER

Ownership
- Owner: Romanian Radio Broadcasting Company
- Sister stations: RRC, R3N, RRM, RAS, RRI

History
- First air date: 2008

Links
- Webcast: http://radioconstanta.ro/asculta-live/
- Website: http://radioconstanta.ro/

Radio Constanța is a Romanian regional public radio station in Constanța.
