= Worldcrunch =

English language news website

- Website type: News website
- Available in: English
- Website: worldcrunch.com
- Launched: 2011

Worldcrunch is a Paris-based English language news website that curated and translated news from international media sources or partner organizations. It was launched in 2011 and was founded by Jeff Israely, former bureau chief for Time Magazine in Europe, and Irène Toporkoff, former CEO of Ask.com France and Angie Interactive. In the words of Jeff Israely, it aims for "The professional (and participatory) selection and translation of the best, most relevant stories in the foreign-language media."

Journalists and translators from around the world contribute to Worldcrunch, which translates articles from top news organizations such as Le Monde, Le Temps, Die Welt, Folha de Sao Paulo, The Economic Observer or America Economia into English. The goal is to compensate for the decline in English-language foreign coverage with translations from quality worldwide media sources. Some partner websites, such as La Stampa or Les Echos, include English sections on their websites that display Worldcrunch translations.

Content includes direct translations, articles that are shortened or fitted with additional context, and in-house productions summarizing current world affairs. Currently in development are a feature called "Crunch It!" that would use crowdsourcing to nominate articles for translation as well as a pay meter.

Jeff Israely wrote a series of articles about the experience for the Nieman Journalism Lab.

On 17 December 2025, Israely announced that the site would no longer publish new articles due to financial issues, though previous articles would remain online.

== See also ==
- Presseurop
- Euranet
- Watching America
- Courrier International
