= Gheorghe Negru =

Moldovan historian

- Born: 1955 (age 70–71)
- Citizenship: Republic of Moldova
- Occupation: Historian
- Known for: Studies on Bessarabia, Moldovan-Romanian relations, and ethnolinguistics in the Moldavian SSR

Gheorghe Negru (born 1955) is a historian and scholar from the Republic of Moldova, known for his research on the history of Bessarabia, Romanian–Soviet relations, and ethnolinguistic policy during the Soviet period. He is the author of numerous academic studies and articles, as well as significant works on national identity and the historical and political transformations in the Prut–Dniester region.

He is married to historian Elena Negru.

== Biography and career ==
Gheorghe Negru was born in 1955. He serves as a coordinating scientific researcher in the Department of Modern History at the Institute of History of Moldova State University (USM). His academic work has focused particularly on the period of the Soviet occupation of Bessarabia and its effects on local society, culture, and identity.

He is the author of the book Politica etnolingvistică în R.S.S. Moldovenească ("Ethnolinguistic Policy in the Moldavian SSR"), considered a reference work in the field, in which he analyses the impact of Soviet policy on the language and identity of the republic’s population.

Negru has also published several books and articles on the history of Romanians in Bessarabia, the processes of Russification and Soviet propaganda, as well as on contemporary topics related to geopolitics and national identity.

== Media presence ==
Negru has appeared on various cultural and historical programmes, including the series Oamenii Cetății ("People of the Fortress") on Radio Chișinău, where he discussed parallels between the crimes committed by the Soviet regime in Bessarabia and those in the current war in Ukraine.
