= Watching America =

Online news website

- Website type: News website
- Available in: English
- Website: www.watchingamerica.com
- Launched: 2005

Watching America is a website that publishes translated foreign articles from foreign newspapers into English. It was launched in 2005 and founded by Robin Koerner. Watching America states its goal is "to reflect as accurately as possible how others perceive the richest and most powerful country in the world."

The site posts newly translated articles up on a daily basis, along with a link to the original article. The translations are done by native speakers of the relevant languages. It currently translates articles from Arabic, Armenian, Chinese, Croatian, Czech, Dutch, French, German, Hebrew, Hindi, Italian, Japanese, Korean, Norwegian, Persian, Polish, Portuguese, Romanian, Russian, Spanish, Swahili, Swedish, Turkish, and Urdu.

The website has been linked by Foreign Policy, The Guardian, Der Spiegel, The Christian Science Monitor as well as cited in various published popular books and academic sources as a source.

== See also ==
- Presseurop
- Euranet
- Worldcrunch
