= Mourad Karami =

Moroccan influencer

- Karami in 2026
- Born: 2 June 2007 (age 19); Marrakesh, Morocco
- Other name: Doc.karami
- Education: Grigore T. Popa University of Medicine and Pharmacy
- Occupations: Medical student, health educator, social media content creator

Mourad Karami (born 2 June 2007), known online as Doc.karami, is a Moroccan medical student, health educator and social media content creator from Marrakesh. He studies medicine in Iași, Romania, and publishes health education content aimed at countering medical misinformation on social media.

== Early life and education ==
Karami is from Marrakesh. He is an international student at the Grigore T. Popa University of Medicine and Pharmacy (UMF Iași) in Romania.

== Social media work ==
Karami publishes health education content on TikTok, Instagram and YouTube. By 2026 he was followed by more than 150,000 people online. His audience is mainly young Moroccans and members of the Moroccan diaspora.

His videos cover health myths, basic medical concepts, healthy lifestyles, mental health awareness, smoking, addiction and nutrition myths. He presents himself as a medical student rather than a doctor, and does not give diagnoses or personal medical advice.

He has been interviewed about his work by Radio Iași and by the Moroccan site Kech24. His work has also been covered by MedicalManager.

In February 2026, Hespress quoted Karami as a health educator in an article on medical misinformation during Ramadan. He warned about false beliefs such as the idea that people with diabetes can fast without medical supervision, and called for health and media education in schools.
