= Presseurop =

News website (2009–2013)

- Website type: News portal
- Available in: Spanish, English, Portuguese, German, French, Italian, Polish, Romanian, Dutch, and Czech
- Editor: Eric Maurice
- Website: www.presseurop.eu/en
- Registration: Not required for viewing, required for commenting (free)
- Launched: 25 May 2009
- Current status: Closed on 20 December 2013

Presseurop was a multilingual Paris-based news portal that translated and published Europe-related news articles daily from over two hundred sources into ten European languages, including English. It was funded by the European Commission and was launched in 2009 by the French newspaper Courrier International, the Portuguese newspaper Courrier Internacional, the Polish newspaper Forum, and the Italian newspaper Internazionale.

Its editor-in-chief was Eric Maurice. Presseurop's stated mission was "to present public discussion of a wide range of issues relating to the European Project and 'bring the European Union to life' through the prism of press coverage in the 27 EU Member States".

Presseurop ceased updates on 20 December 2013 when its funding from the European Commission ended. On 21 May 2014, Voxeurop started, driven by volunteers, in an effort to replace Presseurop.

== History ==
With funding from the European Commission, Presseurop was launched on 25 May 2009 as a European Economic Interest Grouping by four European publications, the French newspaper Courrier International, the Portuguese newspaper Courrier Internacional, the Polish newspaper Forum, and the Italian newspaper Internazionale. It was launched in order to provide a news platform covering the European Union, since, according to deputy editor Gian Paolo Accardo, there is "growing interest in what happens at the European level. Yet the media tend to cover national topics more." The website launched in ten languages and had plans to expand to more languages. In particular, it had mentioned offering Nordic languages.

=== Closure ===
On 2 December 2013, Presseurop announced that its contract with the European Commission would end on 20 December and that the commission does not plan on continuing the project due to budgetary reasons. On 10 December, President of the European Parliament Martin Schulz wrote an opinion piece in Presseurop thoroughly condemning the European Commission's decision and writing that "I am not in favour of automatic and unconditional public support for the media. However, in the current context, one of a sustained lack of curiosity and awareness, and of a trans-European public opinion, the role played by Presseurop is essential."

Presseurop ceased updates on 20 December 2013.

== Content ==
Presseurop published a selection of articles from its sources each day. Each article was translated into Spanish, English, Portuguese, German, French, Italian, Polish, Romanian, Dutch, and Czech, resulting in identical front pages and section pages for each language.

Presseurop's content focus was on topics regarding the European Union, such as politics, culture, economics, and society of the region. Presseurop stated that it had full editorial independence.

The website had published articles from about 350 sources. Most of these were publications based in Europe, reflecting its slogan, "the best of the European press". Over thirty sources, however, were non-European, thirteen of which were United States-based publications.

In addition to news articles, Presseurop published media that includes videos, pictures, and editorial cartoons from its sources.

== See also ==
- Voxeurop
- Euranet
- Watching America
- Worldcrunch
