= Soviet Latvia =

The term Soviet Latvia usually refers to the Latvian Soviet Socialist Republic, a Union Republic of the USSR from 1940 to 1991.

It may also refer to other periods of communist government on the territory of present-day Latvia, e.g.:

- the so-called "Iskolat Republic" (1917–1918)
- the Latvian Socialist Soviet Republic (1918–1920)

== Other uses ==
- Sovetskaya Latviya (Soviet Latvia), a Russian-language daily newspaper published in the Latvian SSR
- MV Sovetskaya Latviya (Soviet Latvia), a transport ship operated by the Soviet industrial concern Dalstroy, a part of the NKVD's forced labour system.
