= Agenția de presă RADOR =

Agenția de Presă RADOR is the largest press monitoring center in Romania, established in 1990. RADOR editors monitor news published in Romanian and in other 15 foreign languages: from audiovisual media – 57 radio and TV stations, from the written media – 150 newspapers and news agencies on all continents.

RADOR publishes news, interviews, analyses and comments grouped in specialised feeds on politics, economy, science, as well as specialised bulletins: "România văzută din străinătate" (Romania Seen From Abroad), "Români de pretutindeni" (Romanians From Everywhere), "Revista presei internaționale" (International Press Summary), "Economia mondială" (World Economy), "Economia românească" (Romanian Economy), "Cei 27 pentru Europa" (27 for Europe), "Balcanii și Marea Neagră" (The Balkans and The Black Sea), "Universul Științei" (The Universe of Science). RADOR also maintains a website.

== History ==
Agenția de presă RADOR was founded on June 16, 1921, replacing the first national news agency, disbanded in 1916 when Romania entered World War I. RADOR was the only Romanian large national news agency in the interwar period. During that time, the "RADOR" name was derived from "Radio Orient"; nowadays, "RADOR" means "Radio Observator".

Apart from its press monitoring service, RADOR also encompasses the "Dimitrie Gusti" Documentation Center, that creates daily, weekly, and quarterly calendars of events, and the RADOR Library, an important documentation source for all Radio Romania departments. The library has about 55,000 volumes, including rare books and princeps editions.
