= Constantin Zablovschi =

Romanian engineer (1882–1967)

- Born: July 16, 1882; Czernowitz, Bukovina, Austria-Hungary (now Chernivsti, Ukraine)
- Died: May 3, 1967 (aged 84); Bucharest, Romanian People's Republic
- Resting place: Bellu Cemetery
- Citizenship: Romania
- Scientific career
- Fields: Physicist; Inventor

Constantin Zablovschi (16 July 1882, in Czernowitz – 3 May 1967, in Bucharest) was a Romanian engineer and pioneer in the field of telecommunications.

== Biography ==
Zablovschi studied at the Faculty of Electrical Engineering at the Technische Hochschule in Charlottenburg (now Technische Universität Berlin) Berlin, and obtained the title of Doctor of Engineering. Upon returning to Romania, he dedicated his career to the development of radio communications, becoming one of the first specialists in this field in the country. He contributed to the establishment of the first radio stations and the development of the national radiocommunication network. Zablovschi was involved in the establishment and development of the Romanian Radio Broadcasting Company. He was also involved in various projects and experiments related to radiocommunications, including establishing the first transcontinental radio links between Romania and other countries.

In the 1930s, Zablovschi achieved a remarkable feat in the field of telecommunications by establishing a transatlantic radio link between Bucharest and New York. Utilizing modern radio technology of the time, Zablovschi oversaw the design and implementation of sophisticated antenna systems, coordinated radio frequencies, and optimized signal strength and quality over vast distances. He died in 1967 in Bucharest, aged 84. A street in the city's Sector 1 is named after him.
