= Media cooperative =

Media model

Media cooperatives are a form of cooperative that report on news based on the geographic location of their membership, or the general interests of the membership. Often they are a form of alternative media, critical of mainstream perspectives, with progressive society stances. However, several cooperatives outside of the West are established mainstream media outlets. Media cooperatives often unite customers and service providers to oppose a pure profit motive in the media. In contrast to mainstream media companies, media cooperatives are able to report independently, due to the minimization of the Principal–agent problem. Media cooperatives are growing in popularity as a form of organization for media reporting, however access to capital and lack of awareness in society present challenges to proliferation.

Examples are: in Germany Neues Deutschland (1946), Junge Welt (1947) and Die Tageszeitung (1978), in Italy Il manifesto (1969), in Switzerland WOZ Die Wochenzeitung (2012) and in Europe Voxeurop (2014). In Hamburg, there is also the "media puzzle factory" as an association of providers to the media and cultural industry.

Some media cooperatives publish the local edition of Le Monde diplomatique.

== Types of Media Cooperatives ==
Consumer

A consumer coop is owned and funded by the consumers of the service. In the context of a media co-operative, consumers would be the readers, watchers, or listeners. Membership fees could be monthly, annually, or a one-time membership fee could be applied. Consumer owned Media Coops sometimes augment their funding with advertisements or government grants.

Multi-Stakeholder

Multi-Stakeholder media coops are the more prominent type of media cooperative. Multi-stakeholder means that cooperative funding could come from worker-owners, consumers, business, or government. Multi-stakeholder coops have more complex ownership structures, and editorial direction and independence is potentially more opaque than a full consumer-owned, or full worker-owned cooperative. The realities of capital access in the modern age usually require that new media cooperatives approach financing via this method.

Worker

Worker-owned media cooperatives are organized in a way that the journalists and other staff of the cooperative control and receive profit from the media cooperative. Worker owned cooperatives are usually smaller, due to scarce access to capital, and less mainstream politically compared to major media outlets. Well financed worked-owned media cooperatives exist, usually due to long periods of operation, capital generation, and prudent financial management.

== List of media cooperatives ==
Name	Country	Language	Format	Type of Coop	Established	Publishing Frequency
La Jornada	Mexico	Spanish	Print, Online	Worker	1984	Daily
Daily Herald Press	USA	English	Online	Worker	2001	Daily
Apache	Belgium	Flemish	Online	Multi-Stakeholder	2009	Daily
New Internationalist	UK	English	Print, Online	Multi-Stakeholder	1973	10 issues a year
Bristol Cable	UK	English	Print, Online	Consumer	2014	Quarterly
Taz.de	Germany	German	Print, Online	Consumer	1978	Daily
NB Media Co-op	Canada	English	Online	Consumer		Weekly
Brazil Popular	Brazil	Portuguese	Online	Multi-Stakeholder	2015	Daily
Junge Welt	Germany	German	Print, Online		1947	Daily
West Highland Free Press	Scotland	English	Print, Online	Worker	2009	Daily
El Critic	Spain	Spanish	Online	Worker	2015	Daily
Ethical Consumer	UK	English	Print, Online	Multi-Stakeholder		Monthly
Sheffield Live	UK	English	TV, Online	Multi-Stakeholder	2003	Daily
Positive News	UK	English	Print, Online	Multi-Stakeholder		Weekly
La Marea	Spain	Spanish	Print, Online	Multi-Stakeholder	2012	Daily
Alternativas economicas	Spain	Spanish	Online	Worker	2013	Daily
Alternatives économiques	France	French	Online	Worker	1980	Monthly
Wisconsin Citizens Media Cooperative	USA	English	Online	Worker	2011	Weekly
Il manifesto	Italy	Italian	Print, Online	Worker	1969	Daily
The Ferret	Scotland	English	Online	Multi-Stakeholder	2015	Daily
The Media Co-op (The Dominion (Canada))	Canada	English	Online	Multi-Stakeholder	2006	
Medor	Belgium	French	Print, Online	Multi-Stakeholder	2014	Monthly
Fourth Estate	USA	English	Online	Multi-Stakeholder	2011	Daily
WNet	Poland	Polish	Online, Radio	Multi-Stakeholder	2009	Daily
La Diaria	Uruguay	Spanish	Online, Print	Worker	2006	Daily
Brecha	Uruguay	Spanish	Online, Print	Worker	1985	Weekly
Krautreporter	Germany	German	Online	Consumer	2014	Daily
RiffReporter	Germany	German	Online	Multi-Stakeholder	2017	Daily
Mutual Interest Media		English	Online	Multi-Stakeholder	2020	
Voxeurop	Europe	English, French, German, Italian, Spanish, Czech, Dutch, Polish, Portuguese and Romanian	Online	Cooperative society of collective interest	2014	Daily
