= Iancu Solomon =

- Born: 1918; Moinești, Kingdom of Romania
- Died: 29 June 1940 (aged 21–22) Hertsa, Soviet Union (now Ukraine)
- Buried: Dorohoi
- Allegiance: Kingdom of Romania
- Branch: Romanian Land Forces
- Conflicts: World War II; Soviet occupation of Bessarabia and Northern Bukovina †

Iancu Solomon (born 1918 – 29 June 1940) was a Romanian soldier of Jewish origin, serving in the 16th Artillery Regiment of Bacău, 1st Battery. He was killed in action on 29 June 1940 in Hertsa (Romanian: Herța), together with his superior officer, Captain Ioan Boroș, and Reserve Second Lieutenant Alexandru Dragomir.

== Origin ==
Iancu Solomon was born in 1918 in Moinești, Bacău County.

== Military service and death ==
During the Soviet occupation of Bessarabia and Northern Bukovina, the Red Army also illegally entered and occupied the Hertsa region, a territory that had not been claimed in the Soviet ultimatum and did not belong to either Bessarabia or Northern Bukovina. At around 4:00 a.m., Soviet mechanized troops entered the town of Hertsa (Romanian: Herța) and reached the position of the 1st Battery of the 16th Artillery Regiment.

Captain Ioan Boroș, the battery commander, attempted to negotiate with the Soviet soldiers, explaining that they had crossed the demarcation line and that Hertsa was not part of the territories ceded by Romania. During these discussions, Soviet forces opened fire. Captain Boroș, Second Lieutenant Alexandru Dragomir, and Private Iancu Solomon were shot and killed on the spot. The Soviet forces later attempted to shift responsibility onto Solomon: after killing him, Soviet soldiers reportedly placed a machine gun in his arms in order to create the impression that he had shot his superior officers.

Historical documents, including later testimonies (such as that of a former soldier from the battery, C. Arig, who later emigrated to Israel), state that Private Iancu Solomon attempted to defend his commander, shielding him with his own body at the moment when Soviet troops opened fire.

Captain Ioan Boroș and Iancu Solomon were initially buried in Dorohoi. Private Iancu Solomon was interred in the Jewish cemetery of Dorohoi. During the funeral ceremonies held in Dorohoi on 1 July 1940, under the influence of far-right propaganda claiming that all Jews sympathized with the actions of the Soviet Union, and amid heightened tensions following Romanian–Soviet clashes, a Romanian border guard unit opened fire on the honor guard composed of Jewish soldiers, triggering the Dorohoi pogrom.
