= Alexandru Margină =

Romanian footballer

Personal information
- Date of birth: 8 March 1993 (age 33)
- Place of birth: Moinești, Romania
- Height: 1.74 m (5 ft 9 in)
- Position: Winger

Youth career
- 2002–2003: AS Avram Iancu Comănești
- 2003–2006: Liberty Salonta
- 2006–2009: FC Brașov
- 2009–2010: Ceahlăul Piatra Neamț

Senior career*
Years	Team	Apps	(Gls)
2010–2016	Ceahlăul Piatra Neamț	64	(5)
2013	→ FC Clinceni (loan)	6	(0)
2016–2017	Viitorul Constanța	0	(0)
2018–2019	Torre Levante	8	(0)
Total		78	(5)

International career^{‡}
2009–2010	Romania U17	3	(0)
2011	Romania U19	2	(0)
- * Club domestic league appearances and goals as of 30 June 2019 ‡ National team caps and goals as of 5 February 2017

Alexandru Margină (born 8 March 1993) is a former Romanian professional footballer who played as a forward.

== Honours ==
Ceahlăul Piatra Neamț

- Liga II: 2010–11
