= Robert Căruță =

Romanian footballer

Personal information
- Full name: Robert Ioan Căruță
- Date of birth: 24 January 1996 (age 30)
- Place of birth: Moinești, Romania
- Height: 1.82 m (6 ft 0 in)
- Position: Midfielder

Youth career
- 2002–2004: Petrolul Moinești
- 2006–2009: ȘF "Gică Popescu"
- 2009–2014: Ceahlăul Piatra Neamț

Senior career*
Years	Team	Apps	(Gls)
2014–2015	Ceahlăul Piatra Neamț	16	(1)
2016	Rapid București	6	(0)
2016–2017	Bregalnica Štip	6	(0)
2017–2018	Știința Miroslava	14	(2)
2019	Dacia Unirea Brăila	12	(1)
2021	Unirea Constanța	3	(0)
2021	Bucovina Rădăuți	6	(0)
Total		63	(4)

International career
2014–2015	Romania U-19	3	(0)
- * Club domestic league appearances and goals as of 12:20, 28 February 2022 (UTC)

Robert Ioan Căruță (born 24 January 1996) is a Romanian professional footballer who plays as a midfielder.
