= Courrier International =

French weekly newspaper

- Type: Weekly newspaper
- Format: Berliner
- Owner: Groupe Le Monde
- Editor: Philippe Thureau-Dangin
- Founded: 1990; 35 years ago
- Political alignment: Liberalism; Centrism; Centre-left
- Language: French; Portuguese; Japanese
- Headquarters: Paris
- Circulation: 168,766 (2020)
- ISSN: 1154-516X
- Website: www.courrierinternational.com

Courrier International (French pronunciation: [kuʁje ɛ̃tɛʁnɑsjɔnal]; lit. 'International Mail') is a Paris-based French weekly newspaper which translates and publishes excerpts of articles from over 900 international newspapers. It also has a Portuguese and a Japanese edition. Courrier Japon was launched on 17 November 2005 and is published by Kodansha Limited.

Its headquarters is located in Paris.

== History and profile ==
Conceived in the autumn of 1987 by five Parisians, Jean-Michel Boissier, Hervé Lavergne, Maurice Ronai, Jacques Rosselin and Juan Calderon, Courrier international was first published on the 8 November 1990, one year after the fall of the Berlin Wall, financed by Pierre Bergé and Guy de Wouters (of the Société Générale de Belgique). The paper is published by the media group La Vie-Le Monde (lit. 'The Life – The World').

A "Volume Zero", in a print run of several hundred demonstration copies, was printed on the 22 June 1988. It was financed by a fund-raising round from family and friends of the founders, brought together a few months earlier in a method dubbed the "calendar multiplier" by Ronai and Rosselin.

The magazine's publication was prescient, it was a time of important international news and the second issue sold 40,000. The issues published during the Gulf War, begun in January 1991, which translated Arab newspapers banned in France, were especially successful. A series of big world developments proved the viability of the concept: the 1993 Russian constitutional crisis described by Russian journalists, Algerian elections through the eyes of the Arab press, the Maastricht referendum as written about in Europe, and Bill Clinton's election as predicted by American newspapers.

Jacques Rosselin, one of the founders, managed the magazine until the end of 1994, less than a year after it was bought by Générale Occidentale (a subsidiary of Alcatel, which also owned L'Express and Le Point). The deal was completed in March 1994 for 83 million francs, though the magazine would wait until 1999 to break even. Courrier International was then sold to Vivendi, together with L'Express, then to Le Monde group, which had looked to buy it since its creation. Rosselin was succeeded by Bernard Wouts, who joined via Générale Occidentale. Wouts, a former executive of le Monde, had met with the founders in 1989 but declined their offer to join the then fledgling magazine.

Today the paper is part of Le Monde group and edited by Philippe Thureau-Dangin, who joined in 1993. A number of original employees are still there, the most senior are Hidenobu Suzuki and Kazuhiko Yatabe, who worked on number zero in June 1988.

For its twentieth anniversary, on the 9 September 2010, Courrier international unveiled a new logo and layout. The redesign was accompanied by a marketing campaign which included an image of two planes passing above digitally shortened towers of the World Trade Center in New York. The image, one of four accompanying the magazine's new slogan « Learn to anticipate » (« Apprendre à anticiper »), solicited numerous negative reactions in the United States.

In 2020 the circulation of Courier International was of 168,766 copies.

== See also ==
- List of newspapers in France
- Voxeurop (ex-Presseurop)
