= Dragomir Hurmuzescu =

Romanian physicist (1865–1954)

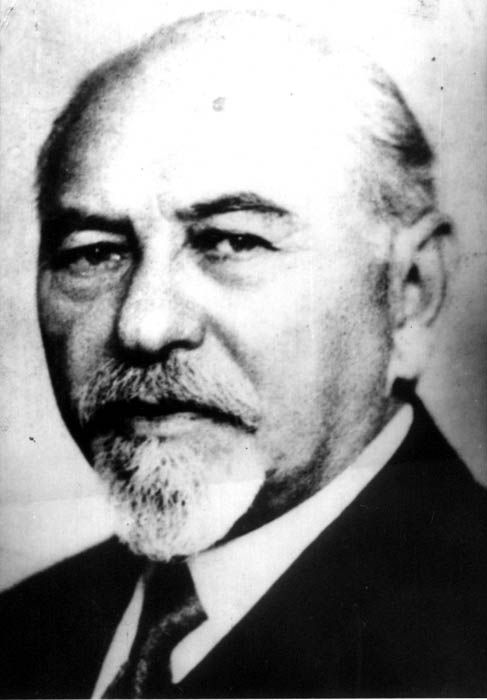
- Born: March 13, 1865; Bucharest, United Principalities of Moldavia and Wallachia
- Died: May 31, 1954 (aged 89); Bucharest, Romanian People's Republic
- Resting place: Bellu Cemetery
- Citizenship: Romania
- Scientific career
- Fields: Physicist; Inventor; Teacher
- Institutions: Romanian Academy of Sciences; Romanian Academy; University of Iași; University of Bucharest

Dragomir M. Hurmuzescu (13 March 1865, in Bucharest – 31 May 1954, in Bucharest) was a Romanian physicist and inventor, teacher at the University of Iași and the University of Bucharest, and a correspondent member at the Romanian Academy.

He is the founder of the electrotechnics science in Romania and a scientific collaborator of Marie and Pierre Curie.

== Biography ==
=== Early years ===
He went to primary school on Polonă Street, in Sector 1 of Bucharest. His secondary school studies were at the Matei Basarab and Saint Sava high schools. During high school, due to financial shortcomings, he had to financially support his family and started to teach French to children from wealthy families.

After graduating from high school, he volunteered in the 4th Vânători Battalion. He moved to Upper Normal School, where he received a scholarship for physics at the Faculty of Sciences at the University of Bucharest. In 1887, at 22 years of age, he graduated from the Physics and Mathematics Department and went to Paris to pursue the Ph.D. studies at the University of Paris.

=== Doctoral studies ===
While in Paris, Hurmuzescu met important European physicists like Joseph Bertrand and Gabriel Lippmann. In 1894, in preparation for his thesis, guided by his teacher, the Romanian scientist invented an insulator made up of a mixture of sulfur and paraffin used in the construction of electroscopes and named it "dielectrine". He began to publish his works in magazines such as the "Bulletin of the Société Française de Physique" and the "Comptes Rendus Hebdomadaires des Séances de l'Académie des Sciences".

Shortly after the discovery of X-rays by Roentgen (1895), Hurmuzescu announced with Louis Benoist the discovery for the first time of the ionization effect produced by X-ray radiations on electrified gases and bodies. This effect is highlighted and measured with a device created by Hurmuzescu - the electroscope that bears his name.

On April 28, 1896, Dragomir Hurmuzescu defended his doctoral thesis, titled "Sur une nouvele détermination du rapport V entre les été électrostatiques et électromagnétiques", which included one of the most accurate measurements for the speed of light.

=== Teaching years ===
In 1896, after obtaining his doctorate degree, Hurmuzescu returned to Romania and was appointed lecturer at the Department of Mathematical Physics from the University of Iași. A year later, he took over, as a substitute professor, the Department of Gravity, Heat and Electricity, within the same faculty.

In 1903, Henri Becquerel used the Hurmuzescu electroscope in Nobel Prize-awarded radioactivity research.

In December 1904, Dragomir Hurmuzescu received the post of secretary general at the Ministry of Public Instruction and Cults, a political post in the new government. The idea for accepting such a political appointment was that it was the only way to finance the development of education in a form as it had been seen in the West. From this position, Hurmuzescu sought ways to establish a more effective experimental education in physio-chemical sciences.

In 1909, following years of preparation supervised by Dragomir Hurmuzescu, the courses of the School of Electricity at the University of Iași, the first electrotechnical school in the country, were opened.

Between 1910 and 1911, the researcher supported and published a number of scientific papers on X-rays, research of radioactivity of mineral, and mineral waters in Romania, and on the improvement of galvanometers. In 1913, he was transferred to Bucharest, where he was appointed director of the Electrotechnical Institute.

In 1916, he was elected a correspondent member of the Romanian Academy of Sciences, and in 1932, he was elected an Honorary Member of the French Electricians Society.

In 1926, Hurmuzescu established in Bucharest the first radio broadcasting station in Romania. At the same time, he made his first attempts at wireless telegraphy transmission. On November 1, 1928, the first radio signal was heard from Romania, featuring Hurmuzescu. He was also elected chairman of the board of directors at the Romanian Radio Broadcasting Company. In 1934, the first Romanian Science Congress was organized under Hurmuzescu in Bucharest.

He retired in 1937 and died in 1954, aged 89. He was buried in Bucharest's Bellu Cemetery. A street in the city's Sector 5 is named after him.

== External references ==
- Membrii Academiei Române din 1866 până în prezent – H
- Biography.name
- Biografie
- Enciclopedia României
- Biblioteca Națională a României
