= Dorohoi pogrom =

1940 massacre of Jews by Romanian troops

On 1 July 1940, in the town of Dorohoi in Romania, Romanian military units carried out a pogrom against the local Jews, during which, according to an official Romanian report, 53 Jews were murdered, and dozens injured. According to the town's Jews, the number of fatalities was between 165 and 200. These acts were committed before Romania entered World War II, before it became Germany's ally, and before the German military entered the country.

Although the Romanian government had taken steps against Jews, including antisemitic laws, and seizure of Jewish property, these military actions against the Jews were not endorsed by the government; when the conspiracy against the Jews was discovered by the military command, troops were sent to put an end to the abuse. The perpetrators, however, were not punished.

== Background ==
The Molotov–Ribbentrop Pact (August 1939) gave the Soviet Union a green light to take back Bessarabia in June 1940 (see June 1940 Soviet Ultimatum, and Soviet occupation of Bessarabia and Northern Bukovina).

During the Romanian Army's withdrawal from Bessarabia, some of the local residents demonstrated their joy. Attacks on the soldiers by locals are also documented. Various reports speak of attacks on the retreating soldiers by Jews, though their veracity is disputed, and some have been proven to be fabrications. Additionally, although the reports defined all of them as "Jews", among the celebrators and attackers were Ukrainians, Russians, pro-Communists, newly released criminals, and ethnic Romanians. These reports, regardless of veracity, did much to incite many Romanians against Jews, strengthening existing Anti-Semitic sentiment.

The Romanian people were traumatized and frustrated by giving up these areas without a war, and the regime's position weakened significantly. The government scapegoated the Jews, with the press' support:

Confronted with an extremely serious crisis and doubting their regime could survive, Romanian government officials turned the Jews into a political "lightning rod," channeling popular discontent toward the minority. Notable in this report is the reaction of the Romanian press, whose rage was directed more toward Jews than the Soviets, the real aggressors. Given that the Romanian press was censored in 1940, the government must have played a role in this bias. A typical form of anticipatory scapegoating was to let Jewish leaders know that the Romanian authorities might launch acts of repression against the Jews.

The incited Romanians, and especially the Romanian soldiers, looked for ways to take revenge on the Jews. In 1930, the population of Dorohoi was 15,866, of which 5,788 were Jews. Although local Jews had long suffered from Antisemitism, it was greatly increased by the passing of Romanian refugees, who were spreading tales of Jews' scheming against the Romanians.

== Preparations for the pogrom ==
On 30 June 1940, soldiers from the two brigades stationed in the area went from door to door warning the Romanian residents of the "revenge" about to take place against the Jews. The Christians placed religious icons in their windows, drew crosses on their homes, or raised Romanian national flags, to let the rioters know not to harm them. In the town, the rumor spread that harming the Jews would be allowed for 24 hours.

== The pogrom ==
In an incident between Romanian and Soviet military men in Herţa, neighboring Dorohoi, the Soviets killed a Romanian officer, and a Jewish-Romanian soldier, Iancu Solomon, who was trying to defend the officer. The two were laid to rest in separate funerals. A firing squad was sent to Solomon's funeral, made up of 10 Jewish soldiers from the battalions stationed nearby. Some local Jews also participated in the funeral. Right after the coffin was lowered into the grave, many shots were heard, and the local Jews ran and hid in the local cleansing room. The Jewish soldiers, turning to the cemetery gates, were surrounded by soldiers from the 3rd Border Patrol battalion, commanded by a Colonel. The Jews, peering from the cleansing room, saw the Jewish soldiers disarmed and stripped of their uniforms. They were put up against the cemetery's back wall and shot by the Romanian soldiers. Seven were killed instantly, and three injured. The Romanians placed a submachine gun in the hands of the already dead Emil Bercovici, the senior Jewish soldier, to stage the notion that he had started firing on the Romanians. An especially strong downpour begun, stopping the killing for a while, and allowing some of the Jewish crowd to slip away. Many Romanian soldiers, commanded by a Lieutenant, removed the Jews from the cleansing room using violence and threats. They were led to a ditch outside the cemetery. Two old men and one child managed to escape before the shooting began. The soldiers continued hunting the Jews hiding in the cemetery with the help of the place's Romanian keeper.

Concurrently, soldiers led by officers and sergeant majors burst into the town shouting "the Bolsheviks are coming". The soldiers raped, robbed, tortured and murdered Jews for 24 hours. The lives of many were saved due to the great attention the soldiers gave to the robberies. Many acts of cruelty were committed, among them:

- Avraham Calmanovici was shot after his testicles were cut off.
- An old couple named Elli and Feiga Reizel were murdered after their ears were cut off.
- Rivka Croitoru had her breasts amputated.
- Hershko Croitoru had petrol poured on his beard, which was then lit up.

The life of the head of the local Jewish community, Dr. Isac Axler, was saved after he managed to prove to the soldiers stopping his carriage that he had been discharged from the Romanian military with the rank of Colonel, and was awarded two medals of valor.

Jews walking in the streets were stopped by officers, had their papers checked, and when their Jewish identity was confirmed, murdered.

At this point, the local 29th infantry brigade, who were not privy to the murder plot, stepped in. The brigade sent a company to patrol the town and restore order. After local Romanians shouted at the soldiers and told them that Jews were firing at soldiers, Lieutenant Vasile Isăceanu took "precautionary measures" - he ordered ten Jewish soldiers, disarmed of their weapons, to march in front of the unit. Soon the unit's soldiers joined the persecution of the Jews, arresting them under false charges of firing at soldiers. The battalion's vice commander, Stino, prevented the soldiers from executing the detained Jews, and saved from certain death 20 Jewish soldiers, who were already stripped bare, waiting to be executed.

A downpour stopped the killings, but not the looting. Some local Roma joined this activity, stole as much as they could from Jewish homes and thanked the soldiers with song and dance.

The pogrom was stopped by order of General Constantin Sănătescu, who discovered the events by accident, seeing injured Jews. He ordered Colonel Ilasievici to investigate the matter.

== The cover up ==
On 2 July, the day after the pogrom, the Romanian military's Chief of Staff reported that the 3rd brigade "took revenge" on the Jews because of the difficulties they had had with the Jews of Bessarabia. According to his report, the soldiers killed four Jews, injured 15, and plundered several shops.

The military prosecutor of the 8th Corps headed a committee to investigate the events, with the participation of doctors and the town's representatives. On 3 July, the military prosecutor found 50 unidentified corpses, among them 11 women, five children and six non-local Jewish soldiers. The prosecutor did not determine the identity of the murderers, and only determined that the deaths were the results of gunshot wounds. The bodies were buried quickly by a company of troops, due to the advanced stage of decomposition they were in. Officially, it was determined that 53 Jews were murdered, but the Jews claimed, according to the community's records, that the number of victims was between 165 and 200. The bodies in the ditch outside the cemetery were not exhumed from their mass grave, and were not counted.

The local head of police, Gheorghe Pamfil, composed a report about a "skirmish event", resulting in the death of a few Jews.

The officers of the 3rd brigade were transferred to other positions, and the brigade left the town with its carriages filled with loot. Among the pillaged goods were cans of paint, which were not properly sealed, and the convoy's trail was marked with paint stolen from the Jews.
