= Radio Vox T =

Vox T Radio

Iaşi, Romania; Romania
- Frequencies: 104 MHz (72.56 MHz, 70.76 MHz - past)

Programming
- Format: AC

Ownership
- Owner: Vox-T SRL

History
- First air date: 13 March 1990
- Last air date: November 2011

Links
- Website: Radio Vox T

Vox T was a radio station in Iaşi, Romania. The station signed on in March 1990, as the first independent non-public radio station outside Bucharest, and the third in Romania, after the change from Socialist system. During its more than 20 years of broadcasting, Vox T enjoyed wide public interest with its phone-in talk-shows and music programmes.

== History ==
Vox T first operated out of T17 students residence hall, part of the Gheorghe Asachi Technical University campus area, than from different locations, broadcasting its signal from a transmitter on top of the Moldova Hotel.

In 1996–2004, Vox T owned a branch in Bacău that broadcast local radio programmes, on 95.1 MHz (71.42 MHz - initial). During the time, it also operated broadcast licenses in Paşcani (102.2 MHz), Hârlău (87.6 MHz), Târgu Neamț (106.7 MHz), Huşi (94.5 MHz), Vaslui (88.5 MHz), and Putna (97.7 MHz). On the news side, Vox T collaborated with Romanian branches of the BBC World Service and RFI.

Radio Vox T closed down operations in November 2011.

== See also ==
- Media in Iaşi
- List of radio stations in Romania
