= Vasile Gherasim =

Romanian politician (1950–2020)

Vasile Gherasim (27 January 1950 – 7 November 2020) was a Romanian politician who served as mayor of Sector 1 of Bucharest from 2000 to 2004 and as Deputy from 2008 to 2012.

He was born in Moinești, Bacău County. In 2005 he was awarded by then-President Traian Băsescu the National Order of Faithful Service, knight rank.

Gherasim died from COVID-19 in Bucharest on 7 November 2020, at age 70, during the COVID-19 pandemic in Romania.
