= Sovetskaya Latviya =

Russian-language newspaper, published in Latvia

- Language: Russian
- Country: Soviet Union
- ISSN: 0233-3643
- OCLC number: 22160697

Sovetskaya Latviya (Russian: Советская Латвия, lit. 'Soviet Latvia', ISSN 0233-3643) was a major Russian-language newspaper in the Latvian SSR.

It was an official publication of the Central Committee of the Communist Party of Latvia and the sister newspaper to the Latvian-language daily, Cīņa. From 1969 onwards, it was also styled as an official organ of the Council of Ministers of the Latvian SSR as well.

== History ==
=== 1919, 1940–1941 ===
The newspaper that became Sovetskaya Latviya was first published in 1940, following the Soviet takeover of Latvia, and the establishment of a monopoly on power by the Communist Party.

During this first period, it was named Nasha Pravda (Russian: Наша Правда, lit. 'Our Truth', 1919) and Proletarskaya Pravda (Russian: Пролетарская правда, lit. 'Our Truth', 1940).

The purpose of Proletarskaya Pravda was to replace the influential, independent Russian-language newspapers, such as widely read liberal Segodnya (Today), with a Soviet-controlled one.

A literary journal with the title Sovetskaya Latviya appeared briefly in 1940–41, but only two issues (Dec. 1940 and Jan./Feb 1941) apparently saw light of day. This short-lived periodical seems to have been little-known even to the Latvian Communist Party Central Committee, as a protocol from a meeting on 2 November 1940 includes the resolution: "Sovetskaya Latviya — clarify what kind of journal this is, as no-one has either seen it or read it."

The invasion of the USSR and occupation of Latvia by Nazi Germany in 1941 interrupted publication in Riga.

=== 1944–1991 and after ===
In 1944, following the re-establishment of Soviet control over Riga and most of Latvia, the newspaper resumed publication in Riga under the name Sovetskaya Latviya.

Sovetskaya Latviya was a broadsheet that appeared daily, except Mondays. During the Soviet period, it dominated the Russian-language newspapers market in Latvia together with the Latvian Komsomol daily Sovetskaya Molodëzh' (Soviet Youth). In 1975, its circulation was 107,500 copies.

During the late 1980s, Sovetskaya Latviya expressed an editorial line critical of the movement for re-establishing Latvia's independence, reflecting the stance of the Communist Party leadership around Alfrēds Rubiks.

Following Latvia's regaining of independence from the USSR, in October 1991 Sovetskaya Latviya changed its name to Panorama Latvii (Russian: Панорама Латвии, lit. 'Panorama of Latvia', ISSN 1407-3676). The editorial line that harshly criticised the policies of the Latvian government was maintained, particularly concerning the treatment of Russians in Latvia. In 2002, the publisher has concluded an agreement on financial support with the Equal Rights party. Panorama Latvii ceased to be published in 2003.

== See also ==
- Eastern Bloc information dissemination
