= Stil FM =

Radio station in Romania

Stil FM 105.5 FM is a radio station in Călăraşi, Romania. The Stil FM radio program includes Pro FM network shows - Morning, Evening and Weekend shows.

Stil FM broadcasts in two cities:*

- Călăraşi – 105.5 FM
- Oltenița – 88.2 FM

*See map of broadcast areas on the Stil FM website.
