= Digi FM =

- Bucharest; Romania

Ownership
- Owner: RCS & RDS

History
- First air date: 2015 (Bucharest)

Links
- Website: www.digifm.ro

Digi FM is a radio station in Romania, launched on November 11, 2015, which focuses on the Hot AC format, playing music from the last 2 decades, and news every 30 minutes. (except on weekends, where news is hourly)

RCS & RDS entered the competition that the CNA organized on November 18, 2013, for the assignment of radio frequencies, requesting over 20 radio frequencies to form networks of the Digi FM and Digi Sport FM radio stations, including in Bucharest on the frequency 106.2 FM (which Click FM broadcast on). RCS & RDS confirmed on October 22, 2013, the future launch of two radio stations, one generalist, with the name Digi FM, and one with a sports theme, Digi Sport FM.

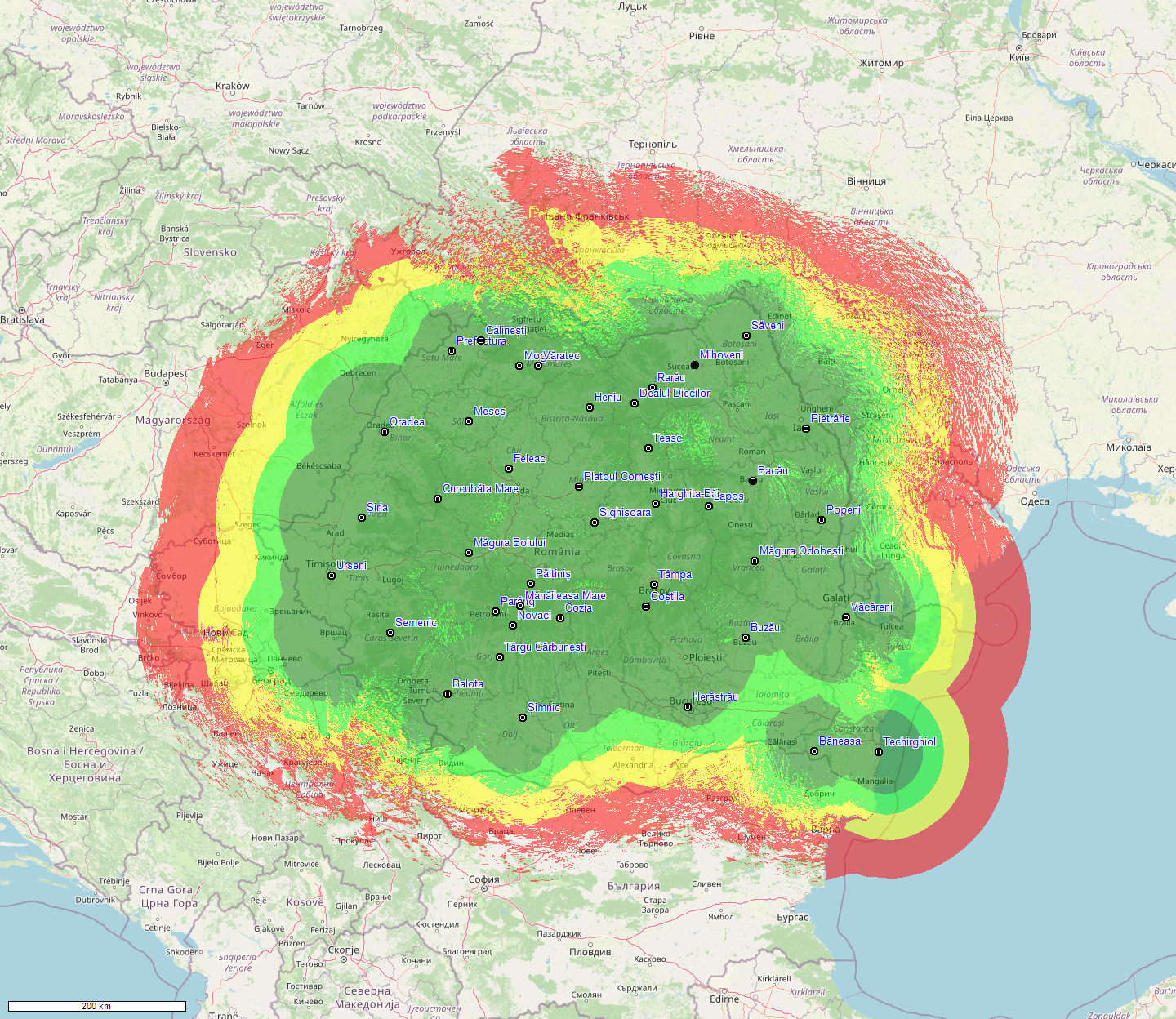
Approximate coverage of the Digi FM signal.

In February 2015, RCS & RDS took over the CME trust's Pro FM and Info Pro radio stations, including the Info Pro frequency network. It was launched on 11 November 2015, on the former frequencies of the Info Pro news station (closed on 12 September 2010), and for the past five years on the PRO FM frequencies.
