= Radio Chișinău =

Romanian language radio station in Moldova

- Type: Radio network
- Country: Moldova
- Availability: National
- Founded: October 8, 1939 by Romanian Radio Broadcasting Company
- Licence area: Moldova
- Broadcast area: Moldova
- Owner: Romanian Radio Broadcasting Company
- Launch date: October 8, 1939, relaunched on December 1, 2011
- Former names: Radio Basarabia; Arena FM
- Official website: Official site

Radio Chișinău is a Romanian language radio station, being the only station of the Romanian Radio Broadcasting Company in Moldova. The Romanian Radio Broadcasting Company launched on 8 Oct 1939 the first radio station ever to broadcast in Chișinău, the capital of the Republic of Moldova.

== FM Broadcasts ==
- Chișinău: 89,6 MHz
- Ungheni: 93,8 MHz
- Tighina: 106,1 MHz
- Cahul: 93,3 MHz
- Edineț: 106,4 MHz
- Briceni: 102,6 MHz
- Drochia: 107,1 MHz

== Gallery ==
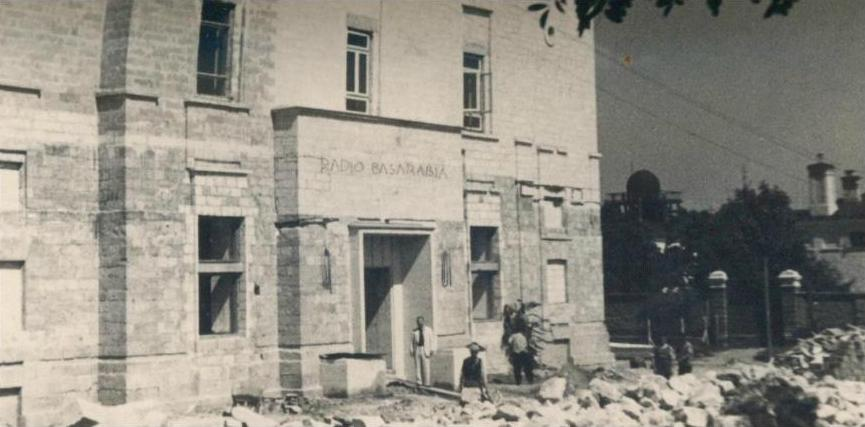
The radio in Chișinău in 1937

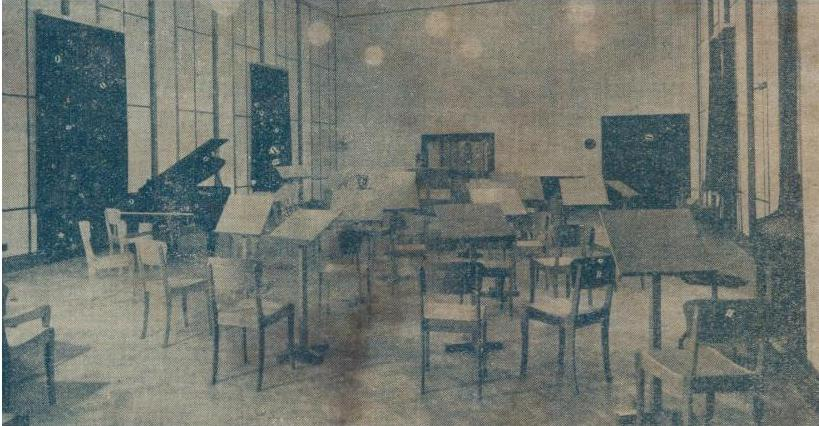
The radio in Chișinău in 1940
