= Băneasa, Constanța =

Băneasa
- Commune
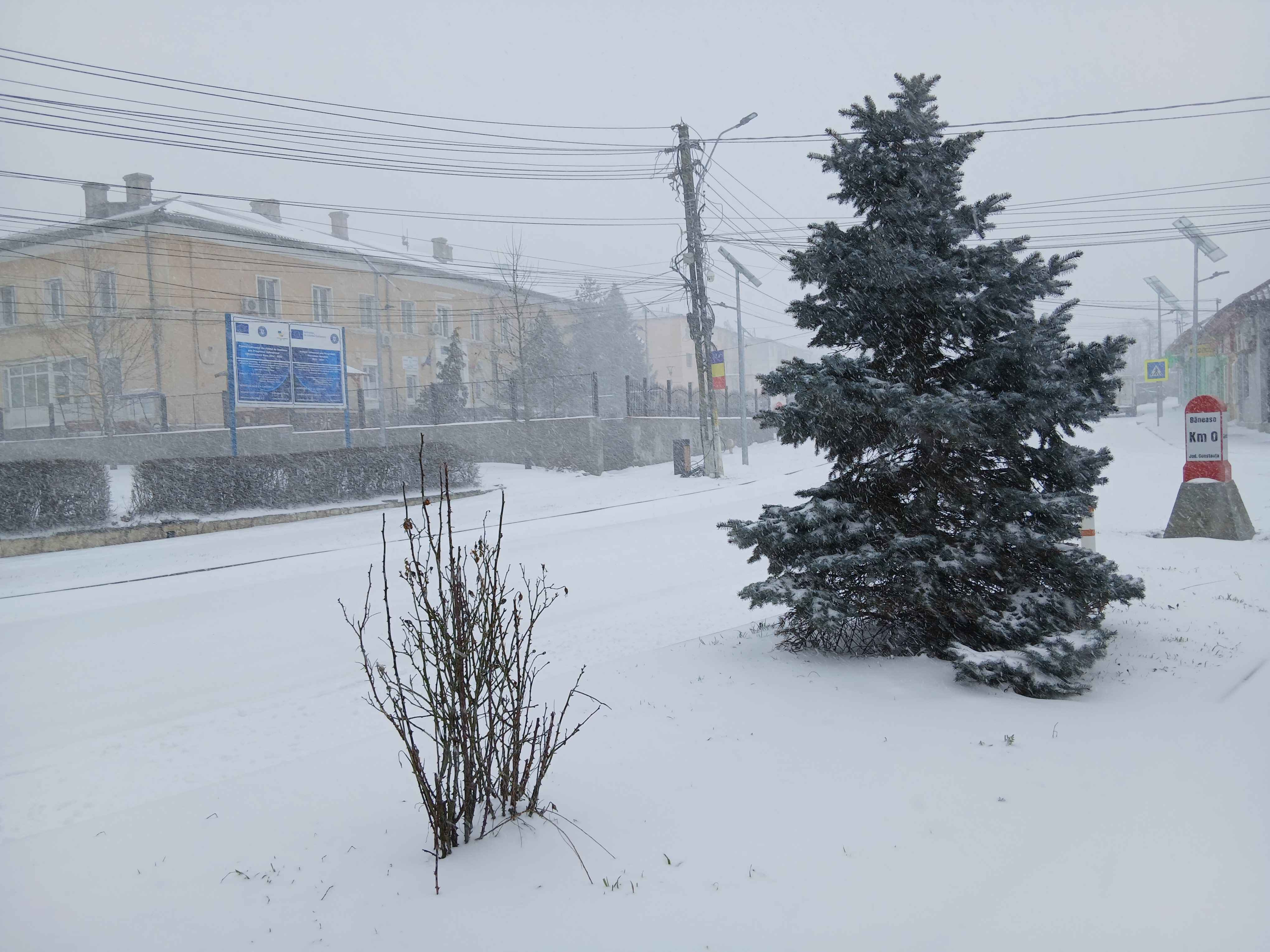
- The town hall of Băneasa commune in winter

- Coat of arms

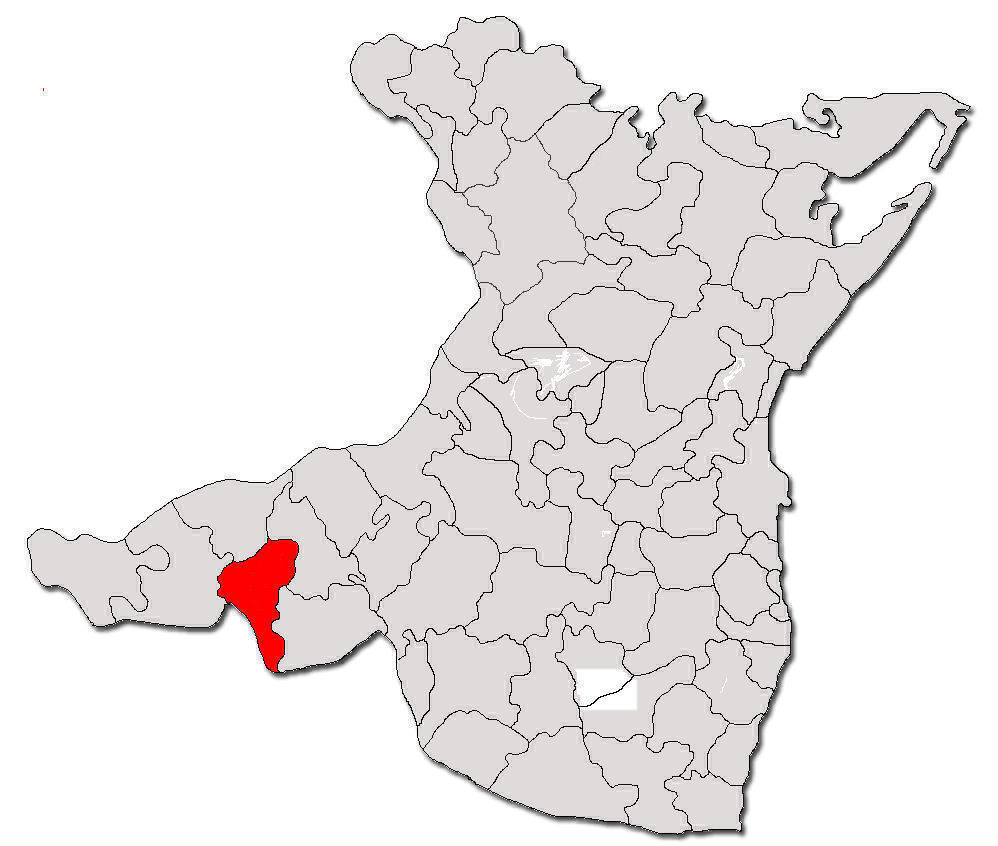
- Location in Constanța County

- Location in Romania
- Coordinates: 44°04′12″N 27°42′00″E
- Country: Romania
- County: Constanța
- Subdivisions: Băneasa, Negureni, Făurei, Tudor Vladimirescu

Government
  - Mayor (2024–2028): Paul Coliș (PSD)
- Area: 109.70 km^{2} (42.36 sq mi)
- Time zone: UTC+02:00 (EET)
  - Summer (DST): UTC+03:00 (EEST)
- Vehicle reg.: CT
- Website: primaria-baneasa.ro

Băneasa (Romanian pronunciation: [bəˈne̯a.sa], historical name: Parachioi, Turkish: Paraköy) is a commune in Constanța County, Northern Dobruja, Romania. It held the rank of town between 10 April 2004 and 17 January 2019, when it was reclassified following a local referendum held on 11 June 2017.

== Geography ==
Băneasa Commune is located in the southwestern part of Constanța County, within the plateau area of the Danubian Dobruja plain, covering an area of 10,970 hectares. It is situated at a distance of 93 km from Constanța and 50 km from Medgidia, which is the closest neighboring city.

The territorial boundaries of the commune are as follows:

- To the North - Oltina Commune and the village of Răzoarele;
- To the East - Ion Corvin Commune and Dobromir Commune;
- To the South - Silistra Municipality (Bulgaria);
- To the West - Lipnița Commune (Romania) and Silistra Municipality (Bulgaria).

The commune administers four villages. Băneasa village is situated at a distance of: 6 km west of Negureni, 3 km south of Răzoarele (Oltina Commune), 2 km north of Făurei, 9 km northwest of Dobromir, 11 km east of Lipnița, and 3 km east of the national border with Bulgaria. It has an inner urban area surface of 204 hectares. The other three component villages are Negureni, Făurei and Tudor Vladimirescu.

== History ==
=== Antiquity and the Drahma Fortress ===
The territory of the commune has been inhabited since the Neolithic era, serving in antiquity as a key transit zone on the military road connecting the major ancient strongholds of Durostorum (Silistra) and Tropaeum Traiani (Adamclisi).

According to local oral history and archaeological findings, a large Geto-Dacian fortress once stood on what is now known as Drahma Hill (also referred to as Drama). This fortified settlement played an important strategic role during the conflicts between Emperor Trajan and King Decebal. The fortress was constructed using natural resources found in the vicinity, particularly stone quarried from the Canaraua Fetei area, and was equipped with numerous defensive towers. The name "Drahma" is ancient, used by locals for generations to designate this geographical feature, and the origin of the name was archaeologically confirmed by the discovery of ancient Histrian coins (drachmas) in the forest near the neighboring village of Goruni. Local historians and tradition suggest that this hoard was buried in haste by Dacian warriors retreating from an imminent invasion and a decisive battle to defend the stronghold. For this reason, the area surrounding the Goruni forest and Drahma Hill is considered a perimeter of outstanding archaeological potential, with a long-held belief that the soil hides further treasures and relics from that turbulent epoch.

Following the destruction of the orchards that had been established during the communist regime, agricultural works on this hill uncovered the remains of a vast ancient necropolis. On this occasion, numerous clay vessels filled with black ash were discovered and destroyed—clear testaments to the cremation rituals practiced by the ancient Dacian inhabitants of the fortress.

=== Early Period and the Ottoman Era ===
The modern settlement was founded around 1750 under the Turkish name Paraköy (meaning "the Village of Money"), a denomination which, according to local legends, originates from a great treasure discovered on these lands by a wealthy Tatar named Beizula. Thanks to its deep valleys (known locally as derele) with natural freshwater springs, the settlement quickly became the most important halting point in southern Dobruja for the mocani (Transylvanian Romanian shepherds) arriving during transhumance from the regions of Săcele and Mărginimea Sibiului.

In 1850, the Ottoman authorities officially recognized Paraköy as a commune, the same year in which the local community erected its first Christian church. In 1869, despite the region still being under Turkish rule, the locals succeeded in establishing the first state school with instruction in the Romanian language, under the guidance of the Dobrujan school inspector Ion Bănescu.

Following the Romanian War of Independence in 1877 and the integration of Dobruja into the Kingdom of Romania, Parachioi experienced strong demographic growth. The Romanian state organized waves of colonization, granting land to war veterans and farmers brought from Muntenia, who learned to coexist in full harmony with the native population of Turks and Tatars. The surrounding villages also developed during this period, such as Ghiuvegea (now Cărpiniș) and Teke-Deresi (now Valea Țapului), as the locals transformed the arid hills into areas well-regarded for viticulture and fruit orchards.

=== World War I: Battle of Parachioi-Calaigi ===
During World War I, the territory of the commune became the scene of intense tactical combat. Between August 30 and August 31 (New Style: September 12–13), 1916, the area hosted the "Battle of Parachioi-Calaigi", a critical clash on the old Dobrujan frontier during the Romanian Campaign.

Following the strategic evacuation of Silistra, the Romanian 9th Infantry Division (composed largely of local recruits from Dobruja) was ordered to establish a defensive line across a 24-kilometer sector spanning from the Danube through Câsla, Parachioi (Băneasa), and Dobromir. The area of Parachioi and the neighboring village of Calaigi (Făurei) formed the strategic center of this line, controlling vital roads leading into the interior of Dobroja.

In the early hours of August 30, 1916, German heavy artillery under the overall command of Field Marshal August von Mackensen unleashed a massive shrapnel barrage on the Romanian positions. Romanian soldiers from the 34th "Constanța" and 40th "Călugăreni" Infantry Regiments, sheltered only in shallow, individual trenches, initially repelled the frontal infantry assaults launched by the Bulgarian 4th "Preslav" Infantry Division. Due to the intense late-August heat and the disruption of supply convoys, the Romanian troops fought under severe dehydration.

A prominent account of the engagement was left by Second Lieutenant Gheorghe Banea (1891–1967), a mobilized platoon leader and future author. Seriously wounded in the head at Parachioi on August 30, he was left for dead on the battlefield and subsequently shot again by a passing German patrol. Banea survived and was rescued by an allied Serbian artillery unit and recounted the ordeal in his 1929 memoir, Amintiri din Marele Război ("Memories of the Great War"). The loss of this defensive position left the region vulnerable, directly contributing to the disastrous fall of Turtucaia a few days later.

== Demographics ==
At the 2002 census, Băneasa had 4,374 Romanians (81.8%), 963 Turks (18%), 14 Roma (0.2%) and 2 others.

At the 2011 census, Băneasa had 3,538 Romanians (70.52%), 1,145 Turks (22.82%), 332 Roma (6.61%) and 2 others.

== Politics and administration ==
Băneasa Commune is administered by a mayor and a 15-member local council. The mayor is Paul Coliș of the Social Democratic Party (PSD). Besides Băneasa, the following villages are also part of the commune:

- Negureni (historical name: Caranlâc, Turkish: Karanlık)
- Făurei (historical name: Calaicea or Calaigi, Turkish: Kalaycı) - named probably after Făurei, Brăila County
- Tudor Vladimirescu (historical name: Regep Cuius, Turkish: Recepkuyusu) - named after Tudor Vladimirescu, a Wallachian revolutionary

The former village of Cărpiniș (historical name: Ghiuvegea) was merged with the village of Băneasa by the 1968 administrative reform.

The territory of the commune also includes the former village Valea Țapului (historical name: Turkish: Teke-Deresi), located at 43.977622°N 27.726374°E, which was disestablished by Presidential Decree in 1977.
