= OneFM =

Radio station in Romania

OneFM was Romania's first club radio station. It was first launched in 1994 as Radio Tinerama. In 2001, it became Mix FM, while in 2007, it became OneFM. On October 23, 2010, it was replaced by Rock FM, but however, OneFM still exists online.
