= Voxeurop =

News website founded in 2014

- Format: Online
- Founded: June 2014
- Language: English, French, German, Italian, Spanish, Czech, Dutch, Polish, Portuguese and Romanian
- Headquarters: Paris, France
- Website: voxeurop.eu/en/

Voxeurop is a multilingual news website aimed at European audiences. Voxeurop was launched in 2014, after the demise of Presseurop.

== History ==
Voxeurop was founded in June 2014. Presseurop content, consisting of around 1700 articles, were recuperated.

Mainly composed of volunteers initially, the team now consists of a network of fifty professional translators, as well as freelancers and occasional contributors.

The website was viewed by 1.25 million unique visitors in 2016, near the target set during the time of Presseurop.

== Editorial line ==
=== Publications ===
The six main themes which defined Presseurop's editorial line are also central to Voxeurop: Politics, Society, Economy, Science and The Environment, Culture and Ideas, and The EU and The World.

The ten languages published on the multilingual website are English, French, German, Italian, Spanish, Czech, Dutch, Polish, Portuguese and Romanian, aimed at a pan-European audience. The languages most commonly appearing on the site are English, French, German, Italian and Spanish.

Every day articles chosen from around 200 European and international media outlets are translated and published. Increasingly, Voxeurop publishes original content and press cartoons, often in partnership with Cartoon Movement.

Beyond partnerships with around 200 European and international press organisations for the translation of articles, Voxeurop has also signed numerous agreements with French and other outlets for the publication of articles on their website. These outlets include Alternatives économiques, Internazionale, Zeit Online, Investigate Europe, Cosmoscène, and BVC News.

=== Independence ===
Voxeurop is editorially and financially independent. Adherence to the Charter of Munich on the Rights and Duties of Journalists and the Global Charter of Ethics for Journalists, the observance of which is monitored by the scientific committee, is intended to guarantee the news site's strict editorial independence. As a cooperative society of collective interest (SCIC), Voxeurop is also independent from its shareholders, who are mostly readers, journalists and translators from 23 different countries.

== Organisation ==
=== Legal form ===
Voxeurop was initially established as an association. It would keep this status for three years before becoming a European media cooperative (SCE) in 2017. Under this status, until 2019, it would remain a cooperative and participative company (SCOP), before becoming a cooperative society of collective interest.

== Business model ==
Voxeurop's business model is based on financial support from readers, similar to The Guardian, but with advertising for non-members. Access to the home page, as well as some articles, is free, but the majority of the site is only accessible through paid subscription. Paid membership is designed to guarantee readers editorial quality and genuine independence, in return for access to exclusive content and the absence of advertising. Since 2021, Voxeurop has sold shares to its subscribers. In 2023, a fundraising campaign drew almost 200 shareholders from 27 countries and raised €25,000.

With "Voxeurop services", the site extends its editorial activities by offering tailor-made editorial services and multilingual translation into all European languages.

Like Osservatorio Balcani e Caucaso Transeuropa and Alternatives économiques, Voxeurop also receives a grant from the European Commission to coordinate the European Data Journalism Network (EDJNet) project. It is also funded by various European foundations, including the European Cultural Foundation and IJ4EU (Investigative Journalism for Europe).

== Awards ==
- Jury Prize at The European Democratic Citizenship Awards (2015)
- Altiero Spinelli Prize for Outreach (2017)
- Second prize for Media at The Good Lobby Awards (2019)

== See also ==
- Presseurop
- Media cooperative
