= Romanian Radio Broadcasting Company =

Public radio broadcaster in Romania

Coordinates: 44.44124°N 26.084476°E

Societatea Română de Radiodifuziune

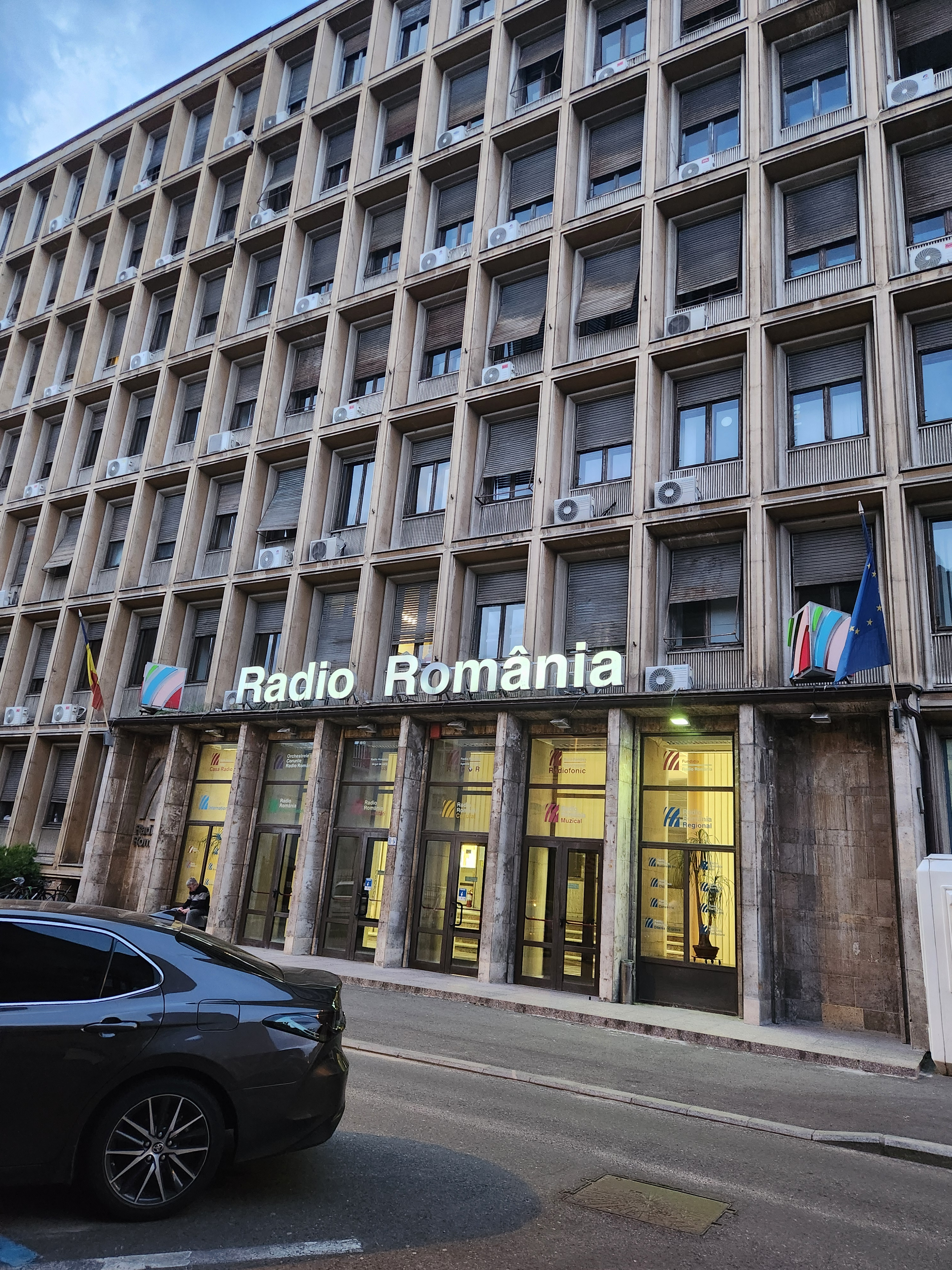
- Radio Romania headquarters in Bucharest
- Type: Radio network
- Country: Romania
- Availability: National & international (through Radio Romania International)
- Owner: Romanian Government
- Key people: Răzvan-Ioan Dincă
- Launch date: 1 November 1928; 97 years ago
- Former names: Societatea de Difuziune Radiotelefonică (1928–1936)
- Official website: www.srr.ro

The Romanian Radio Broadcasting Company (Romanian: Societatea Română de Radiodifuziune), informally referred to as Radio Romania (Romanian: Radio România), is the public radio broadcaster in Romania. It operates FM and AM, and internet national and local radio channels. The local stations are branded under the Radio România Regional umbrella.

Radio Romania International is the company's international radio station, broadcasting on three channels in Romanian, English, French, Aromanian, Spanish, German, Italian, Serbian, Russian, Ukrainian, Chinese, and Arabic.

== Structure ==
The company operates radio stations as well as broadcasting related entities, listed below.

=== National stations ===
FM and AM, internet, and T-DAB radio stations:

- Radio România Actualități (main station with news and pop music)
- Radio Antena Satelor (focused on rural affairs and folk music)
- Radio România Cultural (classical music, theatre and main news programming)
- Radio România Muzical (limited reception, classical music)
- Radio Romania International
  - RRI 1 – Romania Live
  - RRI 2 – Radio Bridges
- eTeatru.ro
- National Radio Theatre
- Radio3Net Florian Pittiș
- Radio România Junior

=== Regional stations ===
- Radio România Regional (the regional network, focused on regional news, minority programmes and mostly oldies, or pop music):
  - București FM
  - Radio Cluj
  - Radio Constanța
  - Radio Vacanța (seasonal, summertime programme of Radio Constanța)
  - Radio Craiova
  - Radio Iași
  - Radio Reșița
  - Radio Târgu Mureș
  - Radio Timișoara
  - Radio Romania Brașov FM
- Radio Chișinău (Moldova)

=== Other services ===
Publishing

- Politică Românească
- Editura Casa Radio (Casa Radio Publishing House)

News Agency

- RADOR

Concerts and events

- Radio România Formații Muzicale (Radio Romania Orchestras and Choirs)
- Târgul de Carte Gaudeamus (Gaudeamus Bookfair)

== History ==
Before 1928, there was a pro-radio movement, led by professor Dragomir Hurmuzescu, who, in March 1925, funded "The Friends of Radio Association".

The first experimental transmission was broadcast in summer 1925, during "Bucharest's month". Periodic broadcasts were made during 1926 and 1927 by "The Friends of Radio Association" and the University Electrotechnical Institute. In 1927 a short wave emitter was installed and were made the first transatlantic experimental broadcasts. "The gramophone recording broadcast through electromagnetic cartridge has been clearly heard in Boston, United States". In March 1928 the Romanian Radio Broadcasting Company was legally founded.

In the 1930s, engineer Constantin Zablovschi achieved a remarkable feat in the field of telecommunications by establishing a transatlantic radio link between Bucharest and New York.

The first radio transmission was broadcast on November 1, 1928, 5:00 PM. The first official radio show was inaugurated by the Romanian physicist and professor Dragomir Hurmuzescu, who became the president of the Administration Council of The Radiotelephonic Broadcasting Company.

On December 18, 1928, the first comic radio show was broadcast.

In 1929, the following shows were broadcast:

- The first show for children: Children's Hour (Ora copiilor, 12 January).
- The first theater broadcast: the poem "One Autumn" (O toamnă) by Alfred Moșoiu (23 January).
- The first live broadcast from the Opera: Aida by Giuseppe Verdi (14 April).
- The first live broadcast from the Romanian Atheneum (28 October).

=== 1928–1937 ===
The number of broadcasting hours increases consistently, reaching 3,517 hours in 1934.

- In 1929, 70% of the radio shows are music shows.
- On 21 March 1930, an opera play from a studio belonging to the RBC is broadcast for the first time (The Barber of Seville).
- On 11 June 1933 – the first live football broadcast: an international match between Romania and Yugoslavia.
- On 4 April 1936, the "Radiotelephonic Broadcasting Company" becomes the "Romanian Radio Broadcasting Company".
- In 1937, Chişinău City Hall gave the Romanian Radio Broadcasting Company a building to open the first radio station in Chişinău, Radio Basarabia, to counter Soviet propaganda.

=== 1938–1944 ===
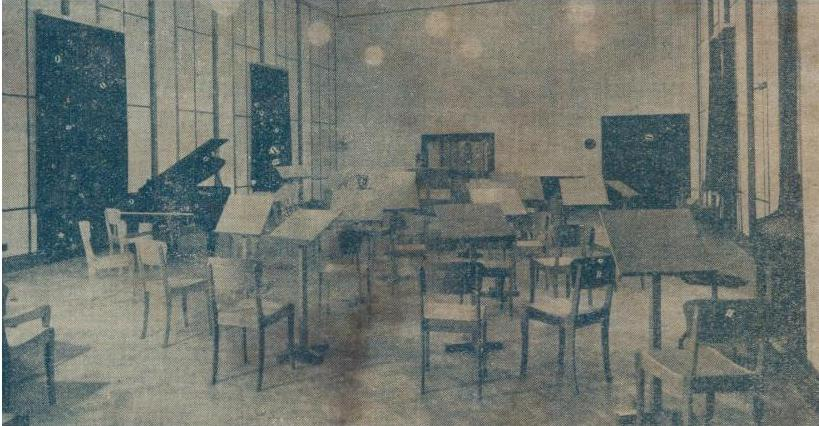
Radio Basarabia in 1940

- In 1938, the spoken shows held a percentage of 22.37%, and the music shows 52.32%.
- The first regional studios:
  - 8 October 1939, in Chişinău, Radio Basarabia (with own shows in Romanian and Russian), (nowadays Radio Moldova);
  - 2 November 1941, in Iaşi, Radio Moldova, (nowadays Radio Iaşi).
- On 12 February 1939 – a Romanian Show for the America was broadcast.
- In 1941, the Radio Chorus was funded.
- During World War II, although the components of the RRBC were dispersed on 22 April 1944, the broadcasting of the shows continued even during the rough moments of August 1944.
- 23 August 1944 – King's message and the Government's proclamation after the coup d'état were broadcast.
- 24 August 1944 – the headquarters of RRBC were destroyed during the German bombing of Bucharest.

=== 1945–1988 ===
The political events after the end of World War II affected the institution.

- 11 June 1948 – the RRBC was fully state controlled; composer Matei Socor is named director-general
- in 1952 the new headquarters of RRBC was inaugurated
- After 1954 the local stations appear:
  - Cluj – 15 March 1954
  - Craiova – 6 June 1954
  - Timişoara – 1955
  - Târgu Mureş – 1958
  - Radio Vacanţa – 1967 (seaside radio station)
- 5 May 1963 – the 3rd channel (Programul III)
- 1985 – the local stations stop broadcasting (by a Presidential Decree). The regime on that time shutted down second and third programme, as well as the local stations to "so-called" electricity saving and enforcing a single, cult-of-personality narrative.

=== 1989–2000 ===
The fall of communist regime brings the revival of several local station which shutted down by them.

- 1990 – Radio Constanța and Antena Bucureștilor started broadcasting.
- Radio Romania International broadcasts in 17 languages on five continents
- The RRBC becomes member of the European Radio Union.
- 24 March 1997 – Radio România Muzical begins broadcasting; 16 hours per day
- 1 December 1998 – Radio București begins broadcasting
- 1999 – Radio Mureş, Antena Braşovului

=== 2004–2011 ===
- The local stations are digitalized 80%.
- 2004 – In cooperation with CNN Radio, RRBC broadcasts the Democratic National Convention, the Republican Convention and the general elections in United States.
- 2 April 2004 – the Correspondent Office of RRBC at Berlin
- June 2004 – the Correspondent Office of RRBC at Brussels
- 21 July 2004 – the Correspondent Office of RRBC at Washington D. C., inside the National Press Building.
- 16 November 2004 – Radio România Tineret becomes Radio3Net and broadcasts only on the Internet
- On July 2, 2008, the Romanian Radio Broadcasting Company changed its logos, introducing a square divided in four shapes.
- 1 December 2011 – Radio Chişinău, the local station which shutted down in June 1940 because of Soviet occupation, relaunched.
