= Radio Iași =

Radio România Iași
- Iași; Romania
- Frequencies: AM 1053 kHz; FM 90.8 MHz; FM 94.5 MHz; FM 96.3 MHz

Programming
- Format: Public, Varied

Ownership
- Owner: Romanian Radio Broadcasting Company

History
- First air date: November 2, 1941
- Former call signs: Radio Moldova

Links
- Website: Radio Iaşi

Radio Iaşi is a public radio station in Iaşi, Romania, broadcasting to the Moldavia region of Romania, and also available in most of Moldova and parts of Ukraine. It features two radio channels, Radio Iaşi Classic and Radio Iaşi FM, which broadcast the same programme but "FM" is a 24-hour channel.

== History ==
The first radio broadcast from the station was on November 2, 1941, under the Radio Moldova name.

== See also ==
- Media in Iaşi
- List of radio stations in Romania
