= Radio Trinitas =

- Romania

Ownership
- Owner: Romanian Patriarchate

History
- Founded: 1996
- First air date: April 17, 1998 (in Iași)

Links
- Website: radiotrinitas.ro

Radio Trinitas is a religious radio station belonging to the Romanian Patriarchate, which aims to promote the cultural-missionary activity of the Romanian Orthodox Church. It was established on the initiative of the Metropolis of Moldova and Bukovina. The broadcast began on April 17, 1998, in Iași.

On April 17, 1998, it began broadcasting in Iași, on the frequency of 92.70 MHz, being the first Christian Orthodox radio station established in Romania.

Since 2001, it has had cooperative relations with several radio stations in Europe, being a member of the "Conference of Christian Radios in Europe" (CERC).

== Frequencies ==
Radio Trinitas frequencies
City	Frequency
Arad	94.2 MHz
Bacau	96.8 MHz
Baia Mare–Mogoşa	94.3 MHz
Bârlad	93.7 MHz
Bechet	103.1 MHz
Bicaz–Toaca	93.3 MHz
Bistrița	93.4 MHz
Botoşani	88.9 MHz
Bucharest	88.5 MHz
Caransebeş	99.9 MHz
Câmpulung Moldovenesc	92.8 MHz
Cernavodă	97.1 MHz
Comănești	93.5 MHz
Constanța	92.4 MHz
Cozia	93.6 MHz
Craiova	100.1 MHz
Darabani	95.6 MHz
Drobeta Turnu Severin	97.9 MHz
Durău	91.8 MHz
Făget–Coșevița	95.2 MHz
Galați–Văcăreni	96.5 MHz
Giurgiu	92.5 MHz
Gura Humorului	92.0 MHz
Harghita–Gheorgheni	93.0 MHz
Hateg	100.2 MHz
Hârlău	92.2 MHz
Hârşova	98.1 MHz
Iași	92.7 MHz
Mangalia	98.9 MHz
Moinești	99.8 MHz
Moldova Nouă	104.3 MHz
Muntenia–Coștila	95.3 MHz
Nucet	96.4 MHz
Onești	88.4 MHz
Oradea	87.8 MHz
Panciu	93.0 MHz
Paşcani	102.2 MHz
Petroșani	93.7 MHz
Piatra-Neamț	91.2 MHz
Plenița	98.5 MHz
Putna	94.8 MHz
Rădăuți	97.8 MHz
Reșița	92.7 MHz
Roșiori de Vede	95.9 MHz
Sebiş	92.1 MHz
Sibiu	93.3 MHz
Sighetu Marmației	87.9 MHz
Slobozia	102.6 MHz
Suceava	106.9 MHz
Sulina	89.2 MHz
Târgu Jiu	93.4 MHz
Târgu Neamț	106.8 MHz
Timișoara	90.3 MHz
Toplița	90.1 MHz
Vaslui	106.7 MHz
Voineasa	107.6 MHz
Zalau	93.1 MHz
