= Euranet =

Consortium of European broadcasters

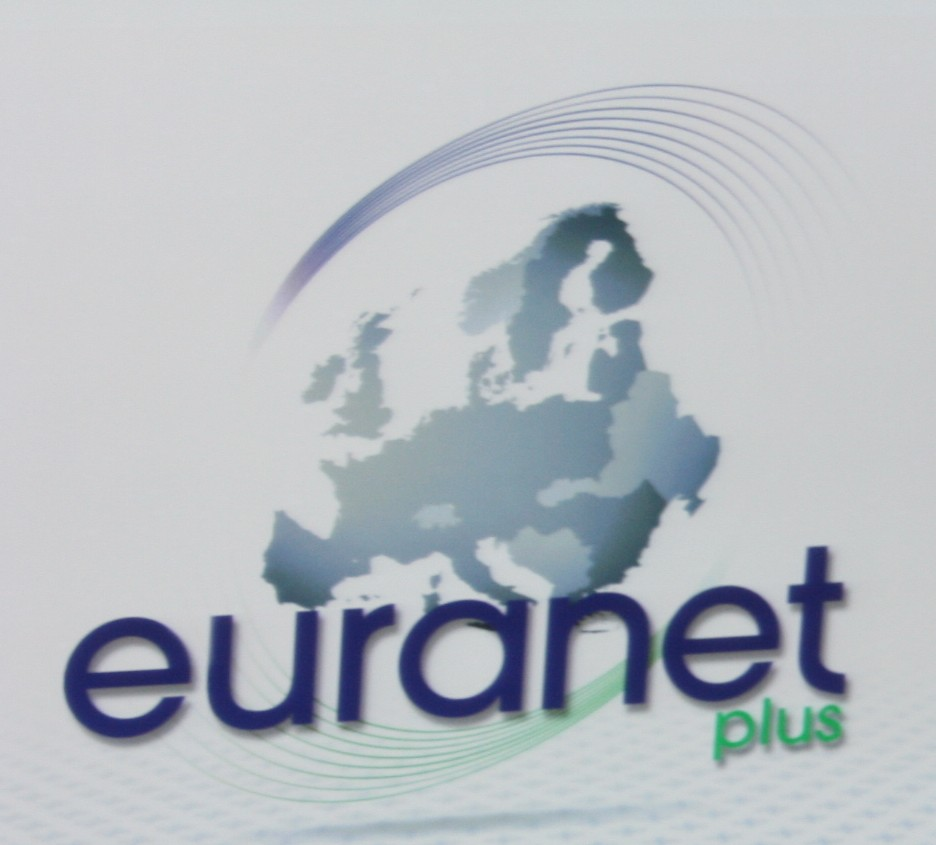
- Broadcast area: Across the European Union

Programming
- Format: International broadcasting

History
- Launch date: April 2008

Links
- Website: http://www.euranet.eu

Euranet, also known as the European Radio Network, is a consortium of international, national, regional, and local European broadcasters.

== History ==
On 25 July 2007, 16 international, national, regional, and local European broadcasters from 13 EU countries formed a pan-European media consortium at the initiative of Deutsche Welle (DW) and Radio France Internationale (RFI). This includes both public and private broadcasters.

On 26 February 2008, Margot Wallström, vice-president of the European Commission, made the official presentation of the European media consortium Euranet in Brussels. In the first year, Euranet programmes were broadcast in the five main languages—German, English, French, Polish, and Spanish—as well as five additional languages—Bulgarian, Greek, Portuguese, Romanian, and Hungarian. Euranet has 26 professional radio stations and 10 campus radios as of July 2012.

== Members ==
The following radio stations are members of Euranet:

Country	Broadcaster
Belgium	RTBF
Bulgaria	Bulgarian National Radio
Croatia	HRT – Croatian Radio
Czech Republic	Czech Radio
Cyprus	Cyprus 107.6
Denmark	Radio Mælkebøtten
Finland	Radio Moreeni
France	Radio France Internationale (rfi); BFM Business; France Inter
Germany	AMS-NET (Radio Bielefeld, Radio Gütersloh, Radio Herford, Radio Hochstift, Radio Lippe, Radio WAF, Radio Westfalica)
Greece	Skai Radio
Hungary	Magyar Radio
Italy	Radio24 – Ilsole24Ore
Latvia	Latvijas Radio
Lithuania	Žinių radijas
Malta	Public Broadcasting Services Ltd (PBS)
The Netherlands	Radio Netherlands Wereldomroep
Poland	Polskie Radio SA
Portugal	Radio Nostalgia
Romania	Radio Romania International; RFI Romania
Slovakia	Radio SiTy
Slovenia	Radio Slovenia International
Spain	Punto Radio Castilla y León
United Kingdom	Community Media Association

== Consortium ==
Euranet was founded as a consortium of radio enterprises from various European countries, and its operations are governed by a service contract with the European Commission, which is its sole source of funding.

== Euranet University Circle ==
In addition to the participating radio stations, Euranet programs are also re-broadcast by several campus radio stations. The local partner stations are associated members of the consortium. The partner broadcasters are

- Finland: Radio Moreeni (University of Tampere)
- Ireland: Trinity FM (Trinity College Dublin)
- Germany: bonncampus 96,8 (University of Bonn)
- Poland: Academic Radio Kampus (University of Warsaw)
- Romania: UBB Radio (Babeş-Bolyai University)
- Spain: Radio Universidad de Salamanca (University of Salamanca), UAB, UNED Radio (UNED – Spanish National University of Distance Education)
- Sweden: Radio Campus Örebro (Örebro University)
