= RFI România =

Romanian language radio service of Radio France Internationale

Rfi Romania is the Romanian language radio service of Radio France Internationale. Unlike BBC Romanian, Rfi Romania has studios that cover most of the urban area of Romania and Moldova.

In 1998 Radio Delta became Radio Delta RFI. In 2006 Radio Delta RFI became RFI România.

== See also ==
- Radio France Internationale
