= BBC Romanian =

Former branch of the BBC World Service

BBC Romanian (1939-2008) BBC News România (2026-) is the Romanian branch of BBC News for Romania and Moldova. Since 2004, it broadcast on its own frequency (only in Bucharest - 88 FM, Chişinău - 97,2 FM, Timișoara - 93,9 FM and Constanţa - 96,9 FM); until then its signal was re-broadcast by local radio stations, partners of BBC Romanian.

On 25 June 2008, the BBC announced that it would close its Romanian language service after 69 years of broadcasting, effective 1 August 2008.

On 22 May 2026, the BBC announced a relaunch of the service. Journalists will curate the editorial offer and ensure there is human oversight of all AI-assisted content which will be clearly labelled when used. Alongside this, the teams will produce original reports and analysis.

== See also ==
- BBC Radio
- BBC World Service
