= Radio ZU =

- Bucharest; Romania
- Frequency: 89.0 MHz (Bucharest)

Ownership
- Owner: Intact Media Group

History
- First air date: 2008 (Bucharest)

Links
- Website: https://radiozu.ro

Radio ZU is a radio station from Romania, owned by the Intact Media Group.

Radio ZU was launched on 29 September 2008. It was launched with an initial investment of approximately 500,000 euros. Radio ZU focuses on the Contemporary Hit Radio format and has a generalist program, with 60% of its own production.

The target audience is people between the ages of 15 and 30. The station's creators include Mihai Morar and Daniel Buzdugan.

In 2025, Radio ZU is the most listened to radio station in Bucharest, with an average daily number of listeners of 194,000.
