= Radio3Net =

Radio3net - "Florian Pittiş"

Romania
- Broadcast area: Internet and DAB (Bucharest only)
- Frequency: DAB on channel 12A (223,936 MHz – Band III)

Programming
- Format: Music
- Affiliations: EBU-UER

Ownership
- Owner: Romanian Radio Broadcasting Company
- Sister stations: RRA, RRC, RRM, RAS, RRI

History
- First air date: 5 May 1963 (as Programul III); 1990 (as Radio România Tineret); 16 November 2004 (as Radio3net); 2007 (as Radio3Net Florian Pittiș); 2011 (as Radio România 3Net Florian Pittiș)
- Former call signs: Programul III; Radio România Tineret

Links
- Webcast: Live webcast
- Website: Official website

Radio 3 net is the former Radio România Tineret (or Radio 3). More than 20,000 albums are stored on Radio 3 net. It is a radio station for young people, currently broadcasting as an online-only radio station. A few of the prominent features available on the website are "1001 Albums You Must Hear Before You Die" and "Search & Play".

Until 2007, the director of Radio3Net was Florian Pittiş. Upon his death, his name was added to the station's name in his honor.

== History ==
In 1972, the editor Sofia Şincan received the task of drawing up the necessary personnel, equipment, spaces and money for a new newsroom, as a new program of the Romanian Radio Broadcasting on ultra-short waves, "Program 3", dedicated to the youth, was to be established. Its aim was to distance the youth from "Radio Free Europe" by offering similar content, but also the subtle administration of ideological treatment. Initially, a scheme of around 80 people had been approved, but shortly afterwards Radiodifuzione was forced to drastically reduce its staff, firing 500 employees. In these conditions, Sofia Şincan had to deal with the existing staff at the "Tineret-Copii" editorial office and with some directors chosen from among those who were to be fired. To the request for a budget of 1,500,000 lei, the president of Radiotelevision, Bujor Sion, replied: "it's done, you have them, but make shows so good, daring, that if you put them on Program 1, I'll put you in prison!".

== See also ==
- Eastern Bloc information dissemination
