= Radio România Muzical =

Romania
- Broadcast area: Romania (The following counties only: AG, BV, B, BZ, CL, CV, DB, GR, HR, IF, MS, OT, PH, TR, VL)

Programming
- Format: Classical
- Affiliations: EBU-UER

Ownership
- Owner: Romanian Radio Broadcasting Company
- Sister stations: RRA, RRC, R3N, RAS, RRI

History
- First air date: 24 March 1997; 28 years ago

Links
- Webcast: Listen Live
- Website: Radio România Muzical

Radio România Muzical is a publicly funded radio station in Romania.

The station broadcasts music of a variety of genres, including symphonic, chamber music, operetta, choral music, folk, jazz, classical music, and soundtracks. It also broadcasts both live and archived concerts, and provides news of national and international events.

== Programming ==
The station programming varies throughout the day, and includes seasonal programming. Day programming generally consists of current news local to Romania, as well as the international music community, alongside audience talk shows. Live concerts as well as archived broadcasts are also played.

== Frequencies FM/DAB ==
- 104.8 MHz – Bucharest
- 97.6 MHz – Regional frequency
- 95.4 MHz – Iasi
- Block 12A: 223.936 MHz Bucharest

== Online broadcast ==
Access is available to online live broadcasts as well as alternative online stations.
