= Radio România Actualități =

National radio station in Romania

- Romania
- Broadcast area: Romania, parts of Hungary, Moldova, Ukraine, Bulgaria, Serbia.
- Frequencies: 105.3 MHz, 855 kHz, 1179 kHz

Programming
- Format: Full-Service (Pop music, news, talk, information, sports)
- Affiliations: EBU-UER

Ownership
- Owner: Romanian Radio Broadcasting Company
- Sister stations: RRC, R3N, RRM, RAS, RRI

History
- First air date: 1 November 1928; 97 years ago

Links
- Webcast: www.srr.ro/stream/rra.asx
- Website: www.romania-actualitati.ro

Radio România Actualități is the first radio channel in Romania. It is owned by the Romanian Radio Broadcasting Company. In 2013 alone, it was the most listened radio station among urban listeners.

== See also ==
- Eastern Bloc information dissemination
