= Radio Romania International =

International broadcasting service of Romania

Radio România Internațional
- Romania
- Broadcast area: International

Programming
- Affiliations: World Radio Network, EBU-UER, Euranet

Ownership
- Owner: Romanian Radio Broadcasting Company
- Sister stations: RRA, RRC, R3N, RRM, RAS

History
- First air date: 1933; 93 years ago

Links
- Webcast: Radio Romania International
- Website: www.rri.ro/en

Radio Romania International (Romanian: Radio România Internațional, or RRI) is a Romanian radio station owned by the Romanian public radio broadcaster Societatea Română de Radiodifuziune (SRR, the national public radio in Romania) that broadcasts abroad. It was created in 1927 and was known as Radio Bucharest before 1989.

According to Romanian Law No. 41/1994, republished, the SRR produces and broadcasts programs in the Romanian language and other languages for a worldwide audience to promote the image of Romania and its internal and external politics. As a result, inside the SRR is Departamentul Radio România Internațional (Department Radio Romania International), which owns two radio stations.

== Stations ==
As of March 2001, RRI 1 has broadcast daily shows under the heading "Romania Live": a summary of the shows produced by the lead departments in the Romanian Radio Broadcasting Corporation. This summary is broadcast around the clock via satellite, on the internet (in RealAudio), and on short wave (to Central and Western Europe and Israel), 8 hours per day. RRI 1 has daily broadcasts around the clock in Romanian and three 30-minute broadcasts in the Aromanian language.

RRI 2 produces and broadcasts shows under the heading "Radio Bridges" in twelve foreign languages: Arabic, Aromanian, Chinese, English, French, German, Hebrew, Italian, Serbian, Spanish, Russian, and Ukrainian, which total 25.5 hours per day.

The station is available on mediumwave, shortwave, and FM, in addition to satellite. RRI has 51 hours of radio programs every day, which amounts to more than 18,600 hours of radio production every year.

== Broadcasts ==
RRI continues to use the analog and digital shortwave Digital Radio Mondiale. RRI broadcasts on shortwave with 300 kW from Galbeni (46.7514°N 26.8557°E) and Țigănești (44.7494°N 26.1028°E), and with 100 kW from Săftica (44.6373°N 26.0746°E) in Romania.

The RRI programmes in English, Romanian may be received on only one frequency instead of two, as of August 1, 2023.

- English Language Broadcasts (UTC):

0100–0200 Freq [kHz]: 7325
0400-0500 Freq [kHz]: 7220, 15250(DRM)
0630–0700 Freq [kHz]: 9620, 21470(DRM)
1200–1300 Freq [kHz]: 15460, 21470
1800–1900 Freq [kHz]: 9570(DRM)
2130–2200 Freq [kHz]: 7375, 7250
2300–2400 Freq [kHz]: 7220, 7325

The shortwave frequencies on which you can receive (only on Sundays) the "Romanian Courier" program are highlighted with the number 1.

- Romanian Language Broadcasts (UTC):

0100–0300 Freq [kHz]: 9700
0500-0600 Freq [kHz]: 7220
0800–0900 Freq [kHz]: 17560, 17750 (1)
0900–1000 Freq [kHz]: 17750, 17640 (1)
1000–1100 Freq [kHz]: 17640, 17800 (1)
1300–1400 Freq [kHz]: 9570
1400–1600 Freq [kHz]: 17790 15370
1700–1800 Freq [kHz]: 9810
1800–2100 Freq [kHz]: 7205

- Day 1 = Sunday

Hours valid as of October 26, 2025 to March 29, 2026:

RRI broadcasts through the Eutelsat 16A satellite at 11512 MHz, vertical polarization, azimuth 16 degrees east, signal speed: 29,950 MSym/s, Standard: DVB-S2, Modulation: 8PSK, Audio PID 510. The satellite transmits unencrypted signals of RRI channels for Europe.

== Bibliography ==
- World Radio TV Handbook. Vol. 75. Oxford: WRTH Publications Limited. 2021. ISBN 978-1-9998300-3-8.
