= Radio Antena Satelor =

- Romania
- Broadcast area: Romania; Czech Republic; China; Hungary; International
- Frequency: 153 kHz LW

Programming
- Format: Rural issues
- Affiliations: EBU-UER

Ownership
- Owner: Romanian Radio Broadcasting Company
- Sister stations: RRA, RRC, R3N, RRM, RRI

History
- First air date: 25 December 1991 (regional coverage); 1 March 2006 (national coverage)

Links
- Webcast: http://89.238.227.6:8042/listen.pls
- Website: http://www.antenasatelor.ro/

Radio Antena Satelor (lit.: Radio Villages' Antenna) is the fifth state-owned radio station in Romania, and is run by Radio Romania. It broadcasts seven days a week, 24 hours a day.

Radio Antena Satelor was heard for the first time regionally on December 25, 1991, with 5 hours of broadcast per day and coverage only in Bucharest, Dâmbovița and Argeș, following which on March 1, 2006, it reached its national position. Radio Antena Satelor includes programs and programs for the public in rural areas, debating the real problems of the typical Romanian village.

== Frequencies ==
Longwave: Bod – 153 kHz, it covers Romania and Republic of Moldova. It partially covers some areas of Ukraine, Bulgaria, Serbia and Hungary. It may not be excluded to be received farther, in countries like: Georgia, Turkey, Denmark (Aarhus), the eastern region of Slovakia and the south-western part of European Russia. At night, the sky wave signal can reach as far as Western Europe on a regular basis, now that other European transmitters on 153 kHz (that were operated by Deutschlandfunk and NRK) have ceased broadcasting. More sporadically, DX reception using specialist receivers and external antennas has been observed in Northeastern parts of North America and South America, most of the Middle East and parts of the Far East (Southeast Asia, Japan and China). Transmitter power output (TPO) 200 kW.

Medium-wave:

Urziceni – 531 kHz, transmitter power output (TPO) 14 kW
Herastrau/Bucharest – 603 kHz, transmitter power output (TPO) 400 kW
Voinesti – 630 kHz, transmitter power output (TPO) 400 kW
Valu lui Traian – 1314 kHz, transmitter power output (TPO) 50 kW
Timișoara – 1314 kHz, transmitter power output (TPO) 30 kW

FM:

Comanesti – 89.0 MHz, effective radiated power (ERP) 1 kW
Sulina – 103.2 MHz, effective radiated power (ERP) 1 kW

- Zalau – 106.9 MHz, effective radiated power (ERP) 0.050 kW

DAB-T:

Bucharest – channel 12A, frequency 223.936 MHz, vertical polarisation.
