= Radio România Cultural =

- Iași; Romania

Programming
- Format: culture
- Affiliations: EBU-UER

Ownership
- Owner: Romanian Radio Broadcasting Corporation
- Sister stations: RRA, R3N, RRM, RAS, RRI

History
- First air date: 1952; 74 years ago

Links
- Webcast: http://www.srr.ro/stream/rrc.asx
- Website: https://www.radioromaniacultural.ro/

Radio România Cultural is the Romanian Radio Broadcasting Corporation's second national channel.

Its schedule concentrates on the production and presentation of dramatic and musical performances (both live and recorded), broadcast coverage of cultural and literary festivals and events, and the provision of special programmes for children and schools.
