= International Emmy Award for Best Kids: Live-Action =

Television award category

- Awarded for: Best Kids: Live-Action
- Country: United States
- Presented by: International Academy of Television Arts and Sciences
- First award: 2020
- Currently held by: Fallen; United Kingdom (2025)
- Website: www.iemmys.tv

The International Emmy Award for Best Kids: Live-Action is presented by the International Academy of Television Arts & Sciences (IATAS) to the best live-action programs intended for young audiences, produced and initially aired outside of the United States. It was first presented in 2020 at the 9th International Emmy Kids Awards.

The International Emmy Kids Awards were presented in separate annual ceremonies until 2021. In 2022, the kids' categories were presented at the 50th International Emmy Awards alongside the rest of the categories.

From 1983 to 2011, productions intended for young audiences competed in a category named Best Children & Young People. In 2012, six kids-specific categories were created. From 2012 to 2019, the categories for Kids: TV Movie/Mini-Series and Kids: Series were presented.

== Rules and regulations ==
According to the rules of the International Academy, the category is for "a fictional production (comedy, drama, or sitcom) intended for a young audience." If the submitted program is a standalone TV movie, it must meet the minimum format length of a televised half-hour time slot (i.e., 20+ minutes of content).

== Winners and nominees ==
=== 2010s ===
Kids - Series

| Year | English title | Original title | Production company/Network | Country |
|---|---|---|---|---|
| 2012 | Junior High School Diaries | | NHK | Japan |
| 2012 | Julie and the Phantoms | Julie e os Fantasmas | Mixer / TV Bandeirantes / Nickelodeon | Brazil |
| 2012 | SLiDE | | Hoodlum / Playmaker Media / Fox8 / Foxtel | Australia |
| 2012 | Leave Me Alone | Stikk | Nordisk Film TV / NRK / SVT / DR / RÚV | Norway |
| 2013 | Pedro & Bianca | | TV Cultura | Brazil |
| 2013 | Limbo | | DR TV | Norway |
| 2013 | Junior High School Diaries | | NHK | Japan |
| 2013 | Beat Girl | | beActive International / beActive Portugal | Ireland |
| 2014 | The Ted Band Society | Polseres vermelles | Televisió de Catalunya / Castelao Pictures / Filmax | Spain |
| 2014 | Dance Academy | | Werner Film Productions / ABC / ZDF / ZDFE / ACTF | Australia |
| 2014 | Nowhere Boys | | Matchbox Pictures | Australia |
| 2014 | Gaby Estrella | | Globosat / Gloob / Panoramica Comunicação / Chatrone | Brazil |
| 2015 | Nowhere Boys | | Matchbox Pictures | Australia |
| 2015 | Penguins and Pastry | Taart | VPRO Television / Pupkin Films | Netherlands |
| 2015 | Braccialetti Rossi | | RAI Radiotelevisione Italiana / Palomar / Big Bang Media | Italy |
| 2015 | Young Hearts | Malhação Sonhos | Globo TV | Brazil |
| 2016 | Casper and the Christmas Angels | Kasper en de Kerstengelen | NL Film & TV / Avrotros | Netherlands |
| 2016 | Hank Zipzer | | Kindle Entertainment / DHX Media / Walker Productions / Screen Yorkshire | United Kingdom |
| 2016 | Presents | Presentes | Canal Encuentro / Mulata Films | Argentina |
| 2016 | Ready for This | | Blackfella Films / Werner Film Productions / Australian Children's Television Foundation / ABC | Australia |
| 2017 | Red Bracelets | Club der Roten Baender | Bantry Bay Productions GmbH / VOX Television GmbH | Germany |
| 2017 | Jamie Johnson | | Short Form Film Company / CBBC | United Kingdom |
| 2017 | O Zoo da Zu | | Discovery Latin America / Boutique Filmes | Brazil |
| 2017 | Shahrukh & Warsan | | The Big Shots LLP | Singapore |
| 2018 | Young Hearts | Malhação: Viva a Differenca | TV Globo | Brazil |
| 2018 | The Peppercorns | Die Pfefferkoerner | Letterbox Filmproduktion / NDR / ARD | Germany |
| 2018 | Jenny | | Productions Avenida | Canada |
| 2018 | Mustangs FC | | Matchbox Pictures | Australia |
| 2019 | The Rules of Floor | De Regels van Floor | NL Film / VPRO Television | Netherlands |
| 2019 | Guru Paarvai | | Blue River Pictures | Singapore |
| 2019 | Jamie Johnson | | Short Form Film Company | United Kingdom |
| 2019 | Young Hearts: Brazilian Lives | Malhação: Vidas Brasileiras | TV Globo | Brazil |

Kids - TV Movie/Mini-Series

| Year | English title | Original title | Production company/Network | Country |
|---|---|---|---|---|
| 2012 | Lost Christmas | | Impact Film & Television Ltd / BBC / Hyde Park Imagination / Ketchup Entertainment | United Kingdom |
| 2012 | Fairy Tales on TV | | EBS | South Korea |
| 2012 | The Star Talers | | Südwestrundfunk / Bavaria Filmverleih und Produktions GmbH | Germany |
| 2012 | The Strongest Man in Holland | De sterkste man van Nederland | NPO / NL Film & TV | Netherlands |
| 2013 | The Phantoms | | Dream Street Pictures | Canada |
| 2013 | Mimoun | | NPO / STETZ FILM | Netherlands |
| 2013 | A Grandson from America | 孙子从美国来 | China Movie Channel | China |
| 2013 | Baron Münchhausen | | Südwestrundfunk / Das Erste / ARD Degeto / teamWorx | Germany |
| 2014 | Anything Goes | Alles mag | BIND / VPRO | Netherlands |
| 2014 | Against the Wild | | Against The Wild Films | Canada |
| 2014 | The Devil with the three Golden Hairs | Der Teufel mit den drei goldenen Haaren | Bavaria Filmverleih- und Produktions / ARD / SWR | Germany |
| 2015 | Rhubarb | Rabarber | NL Film & TV / KRO-NCRV | Netherlands |
| 2015 | The Evermoor Chronicles | | Lime Pictures Limited / Disney Channel | United Kingdom |
| 2015 | Boys | Jongens | NTR / Pupkin Film | Netherlands |
| 2015 | Spelling Armadillo | | Oak3 Films | Singapore |
| 2016 | Peter & Wendy: Based on the Novel Peter Pan by J.M. Barrie | | Headline Pictures / Juliette Films | United Kingdom |
| 2016 | Dede: Mehmet Met de Gele Laarzen | | Corrino Media Group / KRO-NCRV / Z@pp / Mediafonds | Netherlands |
| 2016 | The Salt Princess | Die Salzprinzessin | Askania Media Film Production / ARD Degeto / WDR | Germany |
| 2016 | The White Snake | Die Weisse Schlange | ZDF German Television / Provobis / metafilm | Germany |
| 2017 | Hank Zipzer's Christmas Catastrophe | | Kindle Entertainment / DHX Media / Walker Productions / Screen Yorkshire's Yorkshire Content Fund | United Kingdom |
| 2017 | Nobody's Boy | Alleen op de Wereld | VPRO Television | Netherlands |
| 2017 | Little Lunch | | Australian Children's Television Foundation / ABC Me / Gristmill | Australia |
| 2017 | Once Upon a Time | Wansapanataym: Candy's Crush | ABS-CBN | Philippines |
| 2018 | Ratburger | | King Bert Productions | United Kingdom |
| 2018 | The Great Journey | A Grande Viagem | Aurora Filmes / Haikai Filmes | Brazil |
| 2018 | Dschermeni | | Tellux Film / Sad ORIGAMI Production / ZDF | Germany |
| 2018 | Fairy Tales in Court | | NHK | Japan |
| 2019 | Jacqueline Wilson's Katy | | BBC Children's In-House Productions / CBBC | United Kingdom |
| 2019 | Kids of Courage | Der Krieg und ich | LOOKS / SWR / Toto Studio / BBC Alba / MG Alba / CT / EC 1 Lodz / CeTa | Germany |
| 2019 | Joe All Alone | | Zodiak Kids Studio / CBBC | United Kingdom |
| 2019 | Just Dance | 땐뽀걸즈 | Korean Broadcasting System | South Korea |

=== 2020s ===
Kids - Live-Action

| Year | English title | Original title | Production company/Network | Country |
|---|---|---|---|---|
| 2020 | Hardball | | Northern Pictures | Australia |
| 2020 | Juacas | | The Walt Disney Company Latin America / Cinefilm Brazil | Brazil |
| 2020 | Doopie | Dropje | NTR Television / Submarine | Netherlands |
| 2020 | Extraordinary You | 어쩌다 발견한 하루 | MBC | South Korea |
| 2021 | First Day | | Epic Films / Australian Children's Television Foundation | Australia |
| 2021 | Gameboys | | The IdeaFirst Company | Philippines |
| 2021 | Heirs of the Night | | Lemming Film / Hamster Film / Maze Pictures / Maipo Film / NDR / NRK / AVROTROS / Scope Pictures / ZDF Enterprises | Netherlands |
| 2021 | Nivis: Friends from Another World | Nivis, amigos de otro mundo | Buena Vista International / Metrovision / Non Stop Digital | Argentina |
| 2022 | Kabam! | | NPO / IJswater Films / KRO-NCRV | Netherlands |
| 2022 | Anonymously Yours | Anónima | Netflix / Woo Films | Mexico |
| 2022 | Hardball | | Australian Children's Television Foundation / Northern Pictures | Australia |
| 2022 | Lightspeed | | Oak 3 Films / Mediacorp TV Singapore | Singapore |
| 2023 | Heartbreak High | | Fremantle / Newbe | Australia |
| 2023 | Gudetama: An Eggscellent Adventure | | OLM, Inc. | Japan |
| 2023 | Memory Forest | Kol Od Balevav | TTV Production / Kan Educational / GPG / GMFF / Avi Chai Foundation / Maimonides Fund | Israel |
| 2023 | Tierra Incognita | | Disney+ / Non Stop | Argentina |
| 2024 | One of the Boys | En af Drengene | Apple Tree Productions | Denmark |
| 2024 | Dodger | | BBC Studios Kids & Family Productions | United Kingdom |
| 2024 | School of Funk | Escola De Quebrada | Paramount+ / Paramount Television International Studios / Kondzilla | Brazil |
| 2024 | Gong! My spectRacular Life | | KiKA – Der Kinderkanal von ARD und ZDF / eitelsonnenschein GmbH Germany | Germany |
| 2025 | Fallen | | Globoplay / Night Train Media / Silver Reel / Hero Squared / Umedia | United Kingdom |
| 2025 | Luz | | Floresta (Sony) | Brazil |
| 2025 | Prefects | | Peripheral Vision International | Kenya |
| 2025 | Shut UP | | Alfredfilm / Feelgood SFT / Snowreel / Rabbit Films | Norway |
| 2026 | 31 Minutos: Calurosa Navidad | | Amazon MGM Studios / Aplaplac | Chile |
| 2026 | Those Left Behind | De Achterblijvers | Dark Alley Pictures / Bnn Vara / Black Bee Productions | Netherlands |
| 2026 | Dexter Procter the Ten Year Old Doctor | | Various Artists Limited / Terrible Productions | United Kingdom |
| 2026 | Love at First Spike | | ABS-CBN Studios / iWant | Philippines |

== See also ==
- List of International Emmy Award winners
