= International Emmy Award for Best Kids: Animation =

- Awarded for: Best Kids: Animation
- Country: United States
- Presented by: International Academy of Television Arts and Sciences
- First award: 2012
- Currently held by: Bluey; Australia (2025)
- Website: www.iemmys.tv

The International Emmy Award for Best Kids: Animation is presented by the International Academy of Television Arts & Sciences (IATAS) to the best animated programs intended for young audiences, produced and initially aired outside of the United States. It was first presented in 2012 at the 1st International Emmy Kids Awards.

The International Emmy Kids Awards were presented in separate annual ceremonies until 2021. In 2022, the kids’ categories were presented at the 50th International Emmy Awards alongside the rest of the categories.

From 1983 to 2011, productions intended for young audiences competed in a category named Best Children & Young People. In 2012, six kids-specific categories were created, including Kids: Animation. From 2012 to 2019, a category named Kids: Preschool was also presented.

== Winners and nominees ==
=== 2010s ===
Kids - Animation

| Year | English title | Original title | Production company/Network | Country |
|---|---|---|---|---|
| 2012 | The Amazing World of Gumball | | Turner Broadcasting | United Kingdom |
| 2012 | Ask Lara | Pregúntale a Lara | Tomavistas / Televisió de Catalunya / Red Kite Animations / Submarine | Spain |
| 2012 | Digimon Xros Wars: The Boy Hunters Who Leapt Through Time | 時を駆ける少年ハンターたち / Toki o Kakeru Shōnen Hantā-tachi | Toei Animation / TV Asahi | Japan |
| 2012 | The Jungle Bunch | Les As de la Jungle à la Rescousse | TAT Productions / Master Films / Vanilla Seed | France |
| 2013 | Room on the Broom | | Magic Light Pictures | United Kingdom |
| 2013 | Angelo Rules | Angelo la Débrouille | TeamTO / CAKE Entertainment / France Télévisions / Télétoon | France |
| 2013 | Spike 2 | | TAT productions / Master Films | France |
| 2013 | Larva | | KBS / Tuba Entertainment / SK Broadband | South Korea |
| 2014 | The Jungle Bunch to the Rescue | Les As de la Jungle à la Rescousse | TAT Productions / Master Films / Vanilla Seed | France |
| 2014 | The Amazing Journey of Zamba | La asombrosa excursión de Zamba | Ministerio de Educación de la Nación Argentina / Paka Paka Channel / TV Pública / El Perro en la Luna | Argentina |
| 2014 | Burka Avenger | برقعہ ایوینجر | Unicorn Black | Pakistan |
| 2014 | Strange Hill High | | FremantleMedia Kids & Family Entertainment / CBBC / Factory Transmedia | United Kingdom |
| 2015 | Ronja, the Robber's Daughter | 山賊の娘ローニャ | NHK / NHK Enterprises / Dwango / Polygon Pictures | Japan |
| 2015 | Mr. Trance | | El Recreo Studio / Señal Colombia | Colombia |
| 2015 | Get Ace | | Galaxy Pop | Australia |
| 2015 | The Jungle Bunch: "The Great Treasure Quest" | Les As de la Jungle à la Rescousse: "Le trésor du vieux Jim" | TAT Productions / Master Films | France |
| 2016 | Shaun the Sheep: The Farmer's Llamas | | Aardman Animations | United Kingdom |
| 2016 | Peanuts | | Normaal Animation / Peanuts Worldwide LLC. / Iconix Brand Group | France |
| 2016 | SOS Fairy Manu | SOSO Fada Manu | Gloob / Boutique Filmes | Brazil |
| 2016 | Larva in New York | | TUBAn | South Korea |
| 2017 | Revolting Rhymes | | Magic Light Pictures | United Kingdom |
| 2017 | Oddbods | | One Animation | Singapore |
| 2017 | Siesta Z | | El Perro en la Luna / Señal Colombia / Educa / Pakapaka | Argentina |
| 2017 | Trude's Flatmate | Trudes Tier | Studio Soi / WDR | Germany |
| 2018 | Heads Together | Kop op | Viking Film / VPRO Television / Job, Joris & Marieke | Netherlands |
| 2018 | Dennis & Gnasher: Unleashed! | | CBBC | United Kingdom |
| 2018 | Oddbods | | One Animation | Singapore |
| 2018 | Mini Beat Power Rockers | | Discovery Kids Latin America / Mundo Loco Animation Studios | Argentina |
| 2019 | Zog | | Magic Light Pictures | United Kingdom |
| 2019 | Grizzy & the Lemmings | Grizzy et les Lemmings | Hari Productions | France |
| 2019 | Jorel's Brother | Irmão do Jorel | Copa Studio / Cartoon Network | Brazil |
| 2019 | Lamput | | Cartoon Network / Vaibhav Studios | India |

Kids - Preschool

| Year | English title | Original title | Production company/Network | Country |
|---|---|---|---|---|
| 2012 | El Jardín de Clarilú | | The Walt Disney Company Latin America / Triada / Metrovisión | Argentina |
| 2012 | Cloud Bread | | KBS / GIMC | South Korea |
| 2012 | The Reading Band | Leserkorpset | NRK | Norway |
| 2012 | Octonauts | | BBC Children's / Silvergate Media / Brown Bag Films / CBeebies | United Kingdom |
| 2013 | Ben & Holly's Little Kingdom | | Entertainment One / Astley Baker Davies | United Kingdom |
| 2013 | Box Head | | DR TV | Denmark |
| 2013 | Pororo the Little Penguin | 뽀롱뽀롱 뽀로로 | Iconix Entertainment / Ocon / EBS / SK Broadband | South Korea |
| 2013 | Zou | | Cyber Group Studios / Scrawl Studios | France |
| 2014 | Mike the Knight | | Nelvana / HIT Entertainment | United Kingdom |
| 2014 | MK-X | | NRK | Norway |
| 2014 | Plaza Sésamo: Monstruos en Red | | 2&2 Producciones / Sesame Workshop / MinTIC / Canal Trece | Colombia |
| 2014 | TV Playhouse Tappity Tap | | KBS | South Korea |
| 2015 | Bing | | Acamar Films Production / Brown Bag Films | United Kingdom |
| 2015 | LazyTown | Latibær | Cartoonito / TBS Europe | Iceland |
| 2015 | O Zoo da Zu | | Discovery Latin America / Boutique Filmes | Brazil |
| 2015 | Shimajiro's WOW! | しまじろうのわお！ | Benesse Corporation / TV Setouchi Broadcasting / Dentsu / DASH / demand / The Answerstudio | Japan |
| 2016 | Hey Duggee | | Studio AKA | United Kingdom |
| 2016 | Molang | | Millimages / Teidees Audiovisuals / Canal Plus Multithématique | France |
| 2016 | Earth to Luna! | O Show da Luna | TV PinGuim / Discovery Networks Latin America | Brazil |
| 2016 | Super Wings | 출동! 슈퍼윙스 | FunnyFlux / QianQi / EBS | South Korea |
| 2017 | The Treehouse Stories | La Cabane à Histoires | Dandelooo / Caribara Production | France |
| 2017 | Design Ah! | デザインあ | NHK | Japan |
| 2017 | Mika's Diary | O diário de Mika | Supertoons | Brazil |
| 2017 | Puffin Rock | | Cartoon Saloon / Dog Ears / Penguin / Netflix | Ireland |
| 2018 | Hey Duggee | | Studio AKA | United Kingdom |
| 2018 | The Show with the Elephant | Die Sendung mit dem Elefanten: Planet Willi | Westdeutscher Rundfunk Köln / Trickstudio Lutterbeck | Germany |
| 2018 | Lily's Driftwood Bay | | Sixteen South Studios | United Kingdom |
| 2018 | Luo Bao Bei | 洛宝贝 | Magic Mall / Cloth Cat / 9 Story Distribution International | China |
| 2019 | Bluey | | Ludo Studio | Australia |
| 2019 | Animanimals | | Studio Filmbilder / KiKA – Der Kinderkanal (ARD/ZDF) / SWR | Germany |
| 2019 | Petit | | Pájaro / NonStop / Pakapaka / Señal Colombia | Chile |
| 2019 | SuperWings Mission Teams | 출동! 슈퍼윙스 | FunnyFlux / Alpha / EBS | South Korea |

=== 2020s ===
Kids - Animation

| Year | English title | Original title | Production company/Network | Country |
|---|---|---|---|---|
| 2020 | The Tiger Who Came to Tea | | Lupus Films / Channel 4 | United Kingdom |
| 2020 | Ico Bit Zip | | National Geographic / Copa Studio | Brazil |
| 2020 | Oddbods | | One Animation | Singapore |
| 2020 | Moominvalley | Muumilaakso | Gutsy Animations | Finland |
| 2021 | Shaun the Sheep: Adventures from Mossy Bottom | | Aardman | United Kingdom |
| 2021 | Mush-Mush and The Mushables | Mush-Mush & les Champotes | La Cabane Productions / Thuristar and Cake Entertainment | France |
| 2021 | Petit | | Pájaro / NonStop / Pakapaka / Señal Colombia | Chile |
| 2021 | Tish Tash | | Studio Gale / Big Crunch Entertainment / Korea Educational Broadcasting System | South Korea |
| 2022 | Shaun the Sheep: The Flight Before Christmas | | Netflix / Aardman | United Kingdom |
| 2022 | Dapinty, A Musicolor Adventure | Dapinty, una aventura musicolor | Silverwolf Studios | Colombia |
| 2022 | To Your Eternity | 不滅のあなたへ | NHK | Japan |
| 2022 | Rabbids Invasion: "Mission to Mars" | Les Lapins Cretins: Invasion: "Mission sur Mars" | Ubisoft Motion Pictures | France |
| 2023 | The Smeds and the Smoos | | Magic Light Pictures | United Kingdom |
| 2023 | The Nutty Boy | Menino Maluquinho | Chatrone | Brazil |
| 2023 | Moominvalley | Muumilaakso | Gutsy Animations | Finland |
| 2023 | Rilakkuma's Theme Park Adventure | リラックマと遊園地 | Warf Studios / Field Management Expand | Japan |
| 2024 | Tabby McTat | | Magic Light Pictures | United Kingdom |
| 2024 | Mystery Lane | | HARI | France |
| 2024 | Sharkdog | | Nickelodeon International / One Animation | Singapore |
| 2024 | Wake Up, Carlo! | Acorda, Carlo! | Copa Studio / Netflix | Brazil |
| 2025 | Bluey | | Ludo Studio | Australia |
| 2025 | Lamput | | Warner Bros. Discovery / Vaibhav Studio / Robot Playground Media / Lil Critter Workshop / The Monk Studios / Tribe Audio / The Tuning Folk / Inspidea / Shapeshifter Studio | Singapore |
| 2025 | Lupi & Baduki | Lupi e Baduki | Flamma / Elo / Birdo | Brazil |
| 2025 | Moominvalley | Muumilaakso | Gutsy Animations / YLE / SkyOne | Finland |
| 2026 | Jorel's Brother | Irmão do Jorel | Copa Studio / Cartoon Network Latin America | Brazil |
| 2026 | Lena's Farm | Lenas Hof | Studio Film Bilder Gmbh / Minya Film & Animation / ZDF | Germany |
| 2026 | My Melody & Kuromi | マイメロディとクロミ | Toruku From Wit Studio / Netflix | Japan |
| 2026 | The Scarecrows' Wedding | | Magic Light Pictures | United Kingdom |

== See also ==
- List of International Emmy Award winners
