= International Emmy Award for Best Kids: Factual & Entertainment =

Television award category

- Awarded for: Best Kids: Factual & Entertainment
- Country: United States
- Presented by: International Academy of Television Arts and Sciences
- First award: 2020
- Currently held by: On Fritzi's Traces – What Was It Like in the GDR? Germany (2025)
- Website: www.iemmys.tv

The International Emmy Award for Best Kids: Factual & Entertainment is presented by the International Academy of Television Arts & Sciences (IATAS) to the best factual and entertainment programs intended for young audiences, produced and initially aired outside of the United States. It was first presented in 2020 at the 9th International Emmy Kids Awards.

The International Emmy Kids Awards were presented in separate annual ceremonies until 2021. In 2022, the kids’ categories were presented at the 50th International Emmy Awards alongside the rest of the categories.

From 1983 to 2011, productions intended for young audiences competed in a category named Best Children & Young People. In 2012, six kids-specific categories were created. From 2012 to 2019, two categories—Kids: Factual and Kids: Non-Scripted Entertainment—were presented. In 2020, these categories were merged into the current award.

== Rules and regulations ==
According to the rules of the International Academy, the category is for "any non-fiction program devoted to entertaining and/or informing a young audience (i.e., game shows, reality competitions, variety shows, documentaries, news shows, etc.)."

== Winners and nominees ==
=== 2010s ===
Kids - Factual

Year	English title	Original title	Production company/Network	Country
2012	Newsround: "My Autism and Me"		BBC Children's / CBBC	United Kingdom
2012	The Dreaming Orchestra's 180 Days		KBS	South Korea
2012	Coming Out		NPO / Sky High TV	Netherlands
2012	Truth Lies	Mentira la verdad	Mulata Films / Canal Encuentro	Argentina
2013	Same But Different		Libra Television / Two Sugars	United Kingdom
2013	The Kamaishi Miracle		NHK	Japan
2013	My Father		NPO / IDEA Productions	Netherlands
2013	Truth Lies	Mentira la verdad	Mulata Films / Canal Encuentro	Argentina
2014	What Is Your Dream?	¿Con qué sueñas?	Mi Chica Producciones / CNTV / TVN	Chile
2014	Heart & Soul		1440 Productions	Australia
2014	My Pet, Death & I	Snoffe, Döden Och Jag	Dokumentärministeriet / SVT	Sweden
2014	Think Like a Crow!: The Scientific Method		NHK	Japan
2015	My Life: "I Am Leo"		Nine Lives Media	United Kingdom
2015	Truth Lies	Mentira la verdad	Mulata Films / Canal Encuentro	Argentina
2015	Kore-eda x High School Girls: Portrait of Fukushima 3 Years After		NHK / NHK Educational Corporation / Paonetwork	Japan
2015	The Sand Artist and the War	De Zandtovernaar en de Oorlog	The Media Brothers / RKK /Jewish Broadcasting Organization	Netherlands
2016	Horrible Histories		Lion Television	United Kingdom
2016	Full Proof: Domles	Full Proof: Koepels	NTR	Netherlands
2016	Latin American Dreams	Sueños latinoamericanos	Mi Chica Producciones / Canal 13 / Consejo Nacional de Televisión (CNTV)	Chile
2016	Wild But True		Discovery Networks Asia-Pacific / Beyond Screen Production / Screen Queensland	Singapore
2017	Berlin and Us	Berlin und Wir	Imago TV / ZDF German Television	Germany
2017	Disgustingly Tasty	Asquerosamente Rico	Echando Globos / Señal Colombia / ANTV	Colombia
2017	Miracle Lesson		NHK / TV MAN UNION	Japan
2017	Operation Ouch!		Maverick TV / CBBC	United Kingdom
2018	My Life: "Born to Vlog"		Blakeway North	United Kingdom
2018	Good Host		Oak 3 Films / Mediacorp TV Singapore	Singapore
2018	My Body Belongs to Me	Kroppen Min eier Jeg	Bivrost Film & TV	Norway
2018	Thousand and One Notes	Las mil y una notas	Orquesta Filarmonica de Toluca / Ballet Clasico del Instituto de Cultura del Estado de Mexico	Mexico
2019	Nosso Sangue, Nosso Corpo		Fox Lab Brazil / Your Mama	Brazil
2019	My Life: "Hike to Happiness"		Nine Lives Media / The Wilderness Foundation	United Kingdom
2019	The Ultra Like Experiment	Ultras Like-Eksperiment	STV Productions	Denmark
2019	What’s New?		BBC World Service	Nigeria

Kids - Non-Scripted Entertainment

Year	English title	Original title	Production company/Network	Country
2012	Energy Survival		Fabelaktiv / Enova / NRK / Film 3	Norway
2012	Art Attack		Walt Disney Company Latin America	Brazil
2012	In Real Life		Apartment 11 Productions / YTV	Canada
2012	Wittaya Subprayuth		Workpoint Entertainment / Channel 5	Thailand
2013	Pet School		Cineflix Pet School	United Kingdom
2013	Battle for Money: The Initial Battle		Fuji Television	Japan
2013	Labyrinth		Sveriges Television	Sweden
2013	That's My Art!	Mijn kunst is top!	deMENSEN	Belgium
2014	Wild Kids		Jarowskij / SVT	Sweden
2014	A Hero on Tuesdays	Dienstags ein Held sein	Gigaherz / SWR	Germany
2014	Let's Get Inventin'		Luke Nola & Friends	New Zealand
2014	Where Are We Going, Dad?		MBC	South Korea
2015	Allround Champion	Best i Mest	NRK	Norway
2015	Battle for Money: Return of the Dinosaurs		Fuji Television Network	Japan
2015	Undercover High		General Purpose Entertainment	Canada
2015	The Big Performance		Twenty Twenty Productions / CBBC	United Kingdom
2016	Baking in the Dark	Ultras Sorte Kageshow	Danish Broadcasting Corporation	Denmark
2016	Cinemaniacs		Novel Entertainment	United Kingdom
2016	Look Kool		Apartment 11 Productions Inc. / TVOKids	Canada
2016	Guess Who's Cooking?	Tem Crianca na Cozinha	Gloob / Samba Filmes	Brazil
2017	Snapshots		FORTE Entertainment	Canada
2017	Disney Cookabout		Penguin Films / The Walt Disney Company	South Africa
2017	Our Restaurant	Vår Restaurang	Sveriges Television	Sweden
2017	The Voice Kids		TV Globo	Brazil
2018	Marrying Mum and Dad	Fixa Bröllopet	Fremantlemedia Sverige AB	Sweden
2018	Ali-A’s Superchargers		Endemol Shine North	United Kingdom
2018	Little Masters		Shanghai Canxing Culture & Media Co. Limited	China
2018	The Voice Kids		TV Globo	Brazil
2019	Nighthawks	Nachtraven	De Mensen / Ketnet (VRT)	Belgium
2019	The Baby Boss	Hua Na Ha Kuob	Thai Broadcasting Company Limited	Thailand
2019	The Voice Kids		TV Globo	Brazil
2019	Lego Masters		Tuesday's Child	United Kingdom

=== 2020s ===
Kids - Factual & Entertainment

Year	English title	Original title	Production company/Network	Country
2020	Newsround: "Finding My Family: Holocaust"		BBC Children's In-House Productions / CBBC	United Kingdom
2020	Opa Popa Dupa		Nat Geo Kids / Estudios Telemexico	Mexico
2020	World's Worst Diseases	Världens Hemskaste Sjukdomar	Delta Studios	Sweden
2020	My Notebooks: Seven Years of Tiny Great Adventures		NHK	Japan
2021	Scars of Life		De Mensen	Belgium
2021	My Life: "Picture Perfect"		Big Deal Films	United Kingdom
2021	Ahlan Simsim		Sesame Workshop / Jordan Pioneers	Jordan
2021	The Voice Kids		Globo / ITV Studios / John de Mol	Brazil
2022	My Better World		Fundi Films / Maan Creative / Impact(ed) International	South Africa
2022	Don't Do This to the Climate	Ikke Gjor Dette Mot Klimaet!	NRK	Norway
2022	Newsround: "Let's Talk About Periods"		BBC	United Kingdom
2022	Latin American Dreams	Sueños Latinoamericanos	Mi Chica Producciones / Consejo Nacional de Televisión de Chile / Television Nacional de Chile	Chile
2023	Built to Survive		Butter Media / ABC / ACTF	Australia
2023	Yard TV	Quintal TV	Canal Futura	Brazil
2023	Takalani Sesame		Sesame Workshop / Pulp Films	South Africa
2023	Meet... Anne Frank	Triff... Anne Frank	Cross Media / IFAGE	Germany
2024	The Secret Life of Your Mind	La Vida Secreta de tu Mente	Warner Bros. Discovery / Pictoline	Mexico
2024	Living Library	De Mensenbieb	Skyhigh TV	Netherlands
2024	My Life: Eva's Having a Ball		Fresh Start Media	United Kingdom
2024	The Takalani Sesame Big Feelings Special		Sesame Workshop / Ochre Moving Pictures	South Africa
2025	On Fritzi's Traces – What Was It Like in the GDR?	Auf Fritzis Spuren – Wie war das so in der DDR?	Balance Film GmbH / Germany Mitteldeutscher Rundfunk (MDR) / Westdeutscher Rundfunk (WDR)	Germany
2025	Bora, O Pódio é Nosso		Globo / Sentimental Filmes	Brazil
2025	Kids Like Us		Echo Velvet	United Kingdom
2025	Playroom Live		Eclipse Television Productions	South Africa
2026	Horrible Science		Lion Television	United Kingdom
2026	Mitateru-Phose: Let’s Change Perspectives!		NHK / NHK Educational Corporation	Japan
2026	Adventurous Noah	Nysgjerrige Noah	Fabeleaktiv	Norway
2026	Senior_Szn	Terceirão	Globo	Brazil

== See also ==
- List of International Emmy Award winners
