= 50th International Emmy Awards =

2022 awards ceremony

- Promotional poster
- Date: November 21, 2022
- Location: New York Hilton Midtown, New York City
- Presented by: International Academy of Television Arts and Sciences
- Hosted by: Penn Jillette

Television/radio coverage
- Network: (Online); International Academy’s website

The 50th International Emmy Awards ceremony took place on November 21, 2022, at the New York Hilton Midtown Hotel in New York City, recognizing excellence in television programs produced and aired originally outside the United States, and U.S. primetime programs in languages other than English between January 1, 2021 and December 31, 2021. The award ceremony, presented by the International Academy of Television Arts and Sciences (IATAS) was hosted by Penn Jillette. The nominations were announced on September 29, 2022.

In response to the Russian invasion of Ukraine, the International Academy announced in March 2022 that all programs produced or co-produced by Russian-based companies will be banned from this year's International Emmys. Children's programs competing in the International Emmy Kids Awards were presented during the International Emmy Awards Gala. This year, the International Academy presented for the first time a new Sports Documentary category.

== Ceremony information ==
Nominations for the 50th International Emmy Awards were announced on September 29, 2022, by the International Academy of Television Arts & Sciences (IATAS). There are 60 nominees across 15 categories and 23 countries. Nominees come from: Argentina, Australia, Brazil, Chile, China, Colombia, France, Germany, Japan, Mexico, the Netherlands, New Zealand, Norway, Philippines, Qatar, Singapore, South Africa, South Korea, Spain, Sweden, United Arab Emirates, the United Kingdom and the United States. All these programs were broadcast between January 1 and December 31, 2021; in accordance with the competition's eligibility period.

In addition to the presentation of the International Emmys for programming and performances, the International Academy presented two special awards. Ava DuVernay received the International Emmys’ Founders Award, which was presented by Blair Underwood. The Directorate Award went to Miky Lee, Vice Chairwoman of CJ Group. It was presented by South Korean actor Song Joong-ki.

== Broadcast ==
The event was broadcast live on the International Academy’s website (iemmy.tv) from 8 pm Eastern Time.

== Winners and nominees ==
The nominees were announced on September 29, 2022.

Best Drama Series	Best Comedy Series
Vigil (United Kingdom) (World Productions/BBC One); Lupin (France) (Netflix/Gaumont Television); Narcos: Mexico (Mexico) (Netflix/Gaumont); Reyka (South Africa) (M-Net)	Sex Education (United Kingdom) (Eleven Film/Netflix); Búnker (Mexico) (HBO Latin America/WarnerMedia); Dreaming Whilst Black (United Kingdom) (Big Deal Films); On The Verge (France) (Canal+)
Best Performance by an Actor	Best Performance by an Actress
Dougray Scott as Ray Lennox in Irvine Welsh's Crime (United Kingdom) (Cineflix/Buccaneer Media); Sverrir Gudnason as Kurt Haijby in A Royal Secret (Sweden) (SVT); Scoot McNairy as Walt Breslin in Narcos: Mexico (Mexico) (Netflix/Gaumont); Lee Sun-kyun as Sewon Koh in Dr. Brain (South Korea) (Apple TV+)	Lou de Laâge as Eugénie Cléry in The Mad Women's Ball (France) (Légende Films/Prime Video); Céline Buckens as Talitha Campbell in Showtrial (United Kingdom) (World Productions); Letícia Colin as Dr. Amanda Vergueiro Meireles in Where My Heart Is (Brazil) (Globoplay); Kim Engelbrecht as Reyka Gama in Reyka (South Africa) (M-Net)
Best TV Movie or Miniseries	Best Telenovela
Help (United Kingdom) (All3Media/Channel 4); S(he) (France) (Newen Connect/And So On Films); Isabel: The Intimate Story of Isabel Allende (Chile) (Megamedia Chile); On the Job (Philippines) (HBO/Warner Media)	The King's Affection (South Korea) (KBS/Netflix); Nos Tempos do Imperador (Brazil) (TV Globo); Two Lives (Spain) (Bambú Producciones); You Are My Hero (China) (iQIYI/Tencent)
Best Arts Programming	Best Documentary
Freddie Mercury: The Final Act (United Kingdom) (Rogan Productions); Bios: Calamaro (Argentina) (Buena Vista/Nat Geo); Charlie Chaplin, The Genius of Liberty (France) (France Télévisions/Kuiv Productions); Wonderful World: A New York Jazz Story (Japan) (NHK)	Iraq's Lost Generation (France) (Cinétévé/France Televisions); Myanmar Coup: Digital Resistance (Japan) (NHK); The Evandro Case: A Devilish Plot (Brazil) (Globoplay); The Return: Life After ISIS (United Kingdom) (Sky/Alba Sotorra Productions/MetFilm)
Best Short-Form Series	Best Non-Scripted Entertainment
Rūrangi (New Zealand) (Autonomouse/The Yellow Affair); Pioneer Spirit (Argentina) (TV Pública); Fly on the Wall (Qatar) (Al Jazeera); Santas in the Hay (Norway) (Seefood TV)	Love on the Spectrum (Australia) (Northern Pictures/ABC/Netflix); The Voice Argentina (Argentina) (Telefe); LOL: Last One Laughing Germany (Germany) (Constantin Entertainment/Amazon); Top Chef Middle East (United Arab Emirates) (NBCUniversal)
Best Non-English Language U.S. Primetime Program	Best Sports Documentary
Buscando a Frida (United States) (Telemundo/Argos); 2021 Latin American Music Awards (United States) (NBCUniversal/Telemundo); La suerte de Loli (United States) (Telemundo); Malverde: El Santo Patrón (United States) (Telemundo)	Queen Of Speed (United Kingdom) (Sky/Drum Studios); Chivas (Mexico) (Film 45/Amazon/CobraFilms); Kiyou's Kata (Japan) (Kansai Television); Nadia (France) (Federation Entertainment/Echo Studio)
Kids: Animation	Kids: Factual & Entertainment
Shaun the Sheep: The Flight Before Christmas (United Kingdom) (Netflix/Aardman); Dapinty, A Musicolor Adventure (Colombia) (Silverwolf Studios); To Your Eternity (Japan) (NHK); Rabbids Invasion: "Mission to Mars" (France) (Ubisoft Film & Television)	My Better World (South Africa) (Fundi Films/Maan Creative/Impact(Ed)); Don't Do This to the Climate (Norway) (NRK); Newsround: "Let's Talk About Periods" (United Kingdom) (BBC); Latin American Dreams (Chile) (TVN)
Kids: Live-Action
Kabam! (Netherlands) (NPO/IJswater Films/KRO-NCRV); Anonymously Yours (Mexico) (Netflix/Woo Films); Hardball (Australia) (ACTF/Northern Pictures); Lightspeed (Singapore) (Oak 3 Films/Mediacorp TV)

== Multiple nominations ==
Multiple nominations by country
Nominations	Country
11	United Kingdom
8	France
5	Mexico
4	Japan
4	United States
3	South Africa
3	Brazil
3	Argentina
2	South Korea
2	Chile
2	Norway
2	Australia

== Multiple wins ==
Multiple wins by country
Wins	Country
7	United Kingdom
2	France
