= International Emmy Awards =

Television award

International Emmy Award
- Current: 53rd International Emmy Awards
- Logo
- Awarded for: Excellence in television programming outside the U.S.
- Country: United States
- Presented by: International Academy of Television Arts & Sciences
- First award: November 19, 1973; 52 years ago
- Website: iemmys.tv

The International Emmy Awards, or International Emmys, are part of the extensive range of Emmy Awards for artistic and technical merit for the television industry. Bestowed by the New York–based International Academy of Television Arts and Sciences (IATAS), the International Emmys are presented in recognition to the best television programs initially produced and aired outside the United States. The awards are presented at the International Emmy Awards Gala, held annually in November in New York City. It attracts over 1,200 television professionals. The first International Emmys ceremony was held in 1973, expanding what was originally a U.S.-only Emmy Award.

== History ==
When the first Emmy Award ceremony took place on January 25, 1949, it only recognized programming produced in the United States.

Founded in 1969, the International Academy of Television Arts and Sciences (IATAS) is a membership based organization of leading media and entertainment figures from over 50 countries and 500 companies from all sectors of television including internet, mobile and technology. It is part of the National Academy of Television Arts and Sciences; however, it operates under its own board of directors with a global focus. Today, it also recognizes excellence in U.S. programming with a Non-English language U.S. primetime programming category.

The first International Emmy Awards, as we know them today, were carried out in 1973, and was organized by Ralph Baruch in a ceremony held at the Plaza Hotel in Manhattan. The event was attended by about 200 guests.

Currently, the awards are presented at the International Emmy Awards Gala. Held each year in November at the Hilton Hotel in Midtown Manhattan, the Gala attracts over 1,000 major figures in broadcast, entertainment and media from around the world.

The International Academy also presents News Emmys with its counterpart in the U.S. The International Emmy Kids Awards are presented annually at Mipcom in Cannes.

== Rules ==
The International Academy of Television Arts and Sciences organizes competitions in several distinctive areas: Kids categories (presented in April at MIPTV), News categories (Presented in September/October in New York City), and Programs and Performances categories (presented in November in New York).

In general, any non-U.S. organization or individual (such as a network, a local or regional television station, producer, director, or writer) may submit a program, regardless of whether they are a member of the IATAS. For shows that are co-produced between U.S. and foreign production companies, they may be eligible if they initially aired outside of the U.S., or if their broadcast dates were within a few days of each other. A program that enters into the international competition cannot also be entered into any of the domestic ones.

There are three rounds of judging for each International Emmy season. The preliminary round takes place online in the spring; the semi-final round takes place in the summer and is hosted by Academy members around the world; the final round takes place only in September/October. A television station or their representatives may never vote in the categories in which they are competing. The Academy does not participate in the trial. Who evaluates the registered programs are about 600 television professionals from 40 countries. The whole process is audited by Ernst & Young.

== Categories ==
=== Current categories ===
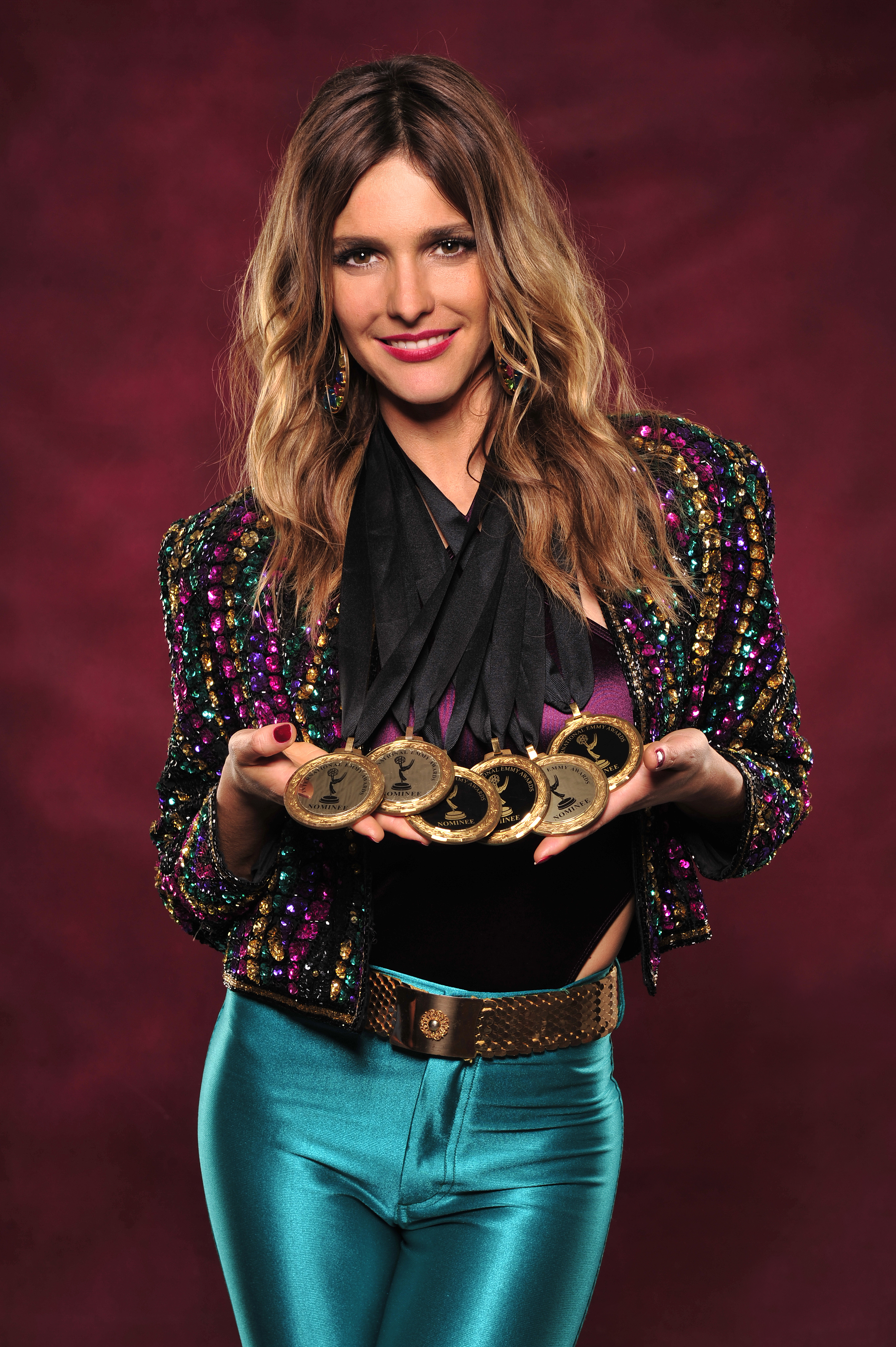
Brazilian actress Fernanda Lima holding Rede Globo's six medals of nominations in 2012

Currently, International Emmy Awards are given in the following categories:

Program Categories

- Arts Programming
- Comedy Series
- Documentary
- Sports Documentary
- Drama Series
- Non-Scripted Entertainment
- Telenovela
- Short-Form Series
- TV movie or Miniseries

Performance Categories

- Best Performance by an Actor
- Best Performance by an Actress

News & Current Affairs Categories

- News
- Current Affairs

Kids Categories

- Kids: Animation
- Kids: Factual & Entertainment
- Kids: Live-Action

=== Retired categories ===
- Best Drama (1979–2001)
- Best European Artist (1973)
- Best Arts Documentary (1991–2001)
- Best Performing Arts (1979–2001)
- Best Popular Arts (1968–2001)
- Best Children & Young People (1983–2011)
- Best Non-English Language U.S. Primetime Program (2014–2022)

== Special Categories ==
- International Emmy Directorate Award
- International Emmy Founders Award

== See also ==
- List of American television awards
- List of International Emmy Award winners
