= ¿Con qué sueñas? =

Chilean television series

- Also known as: What is your Dream?
- Created by: Paula Gómez Vera
- Country of origin: Chile
- Original language: Spanish

Original release
- Network: TVN

¿Con qué sueñas? (English: What is your Dream?) is a Chilean television series created by Paula Gómez Vera. Both his first and second season counted on 16 episodes of 30 minutes each. The show was broadcast on TVN, and received a number of awards, including two Emmys in 2011 and 2015.

== Awards ==
Year	Award	Category	Result
2011	39th International Emmy Awards	Children & Young People	Won
2015	International Emmy Kids Awards	Kids: Factual	Won
