= 6th International Emmy Kids Awards =

2018 children's television awards

- Date: April 10, 2018
- Location: Carlton Hotel, Cannes, France

The 6th International Emmy Kids Awards ceremony took place on April 10, 2018, in Cannes, France. The nominations were announced by the International Academy of Television Arts and Sciences (IATAS) on October 16, 2017. They are the only Emmys presented outside the U.S.

== Ceremony information ==
Nominations for the 6th International Emmy Kids Awards were announced on October 16, 2017, by the International Academy of Television Arts and Sciences (IATAS) during a press conference at MIPCOM in Cannes, France. The winners were announced on April 10, 2018, at the Carlton Hotel, in Cannes, France during MIPTV. The winners spanned series from Canada, France, Germany, Norway and the United Kingdom.

== Winners ==
Kids: Animation	Kids: Preschool
Revolting Rhymes - (United Kingdom) - (Magic Light Pictures); Oddbods - (Singapore) - (One Animation); Siesta Z - (Argentina) - (El Perro en la Luna/Señal Colombia/Educa/PakaPaka); Trudes Tier - (Germany) - (Studio Soi/WDR)	La Cabane à Histoires - (France) (Dandelooo/Caribara Production); Design Ah! - (Japan) - (NHK); O Diário de Mika - (Brazil) (Supertoons); Puffin Rock - (Ireland) - (Cartoon Saloon/Dog Ears/Penguin/Netflix)
Kids: Series	Kids: TV Movie/Mini-Series
Club der Roten Baender (Germany) (Bantry Bay Productions/VOX Television); O Zoo da Zu (Brazil) - (Discovery Kids/Boutique Films); Jamie Johnson (United Kingdom) - (Short Form Film Company/CBBC); Shahrukh and Warsan (Singapore) - (The Big Shots)	Hank Zipzer's Christmas Catastrophe - (United Kingdom) - (CBBC); Little Lunch - (Australia) - (ACTF/ABC Me/Gristmill); Alleen op de Wereld - (Netherlands) - (VPRO Television); Wansapanataym – Candy’s Crush - (Philippines) - (ABS-CBN)
Kids: Non-Scripted Entertainment	Kids: Factual
Snapshots - (Canada) - (FORTE Entertainment); Disney Cookabout - (South Africa) - (Penguin Films/Walt Disney Company); Vår Restaurang - (Sweden) - (SVT); The Voice Kids - (Brazil) - (TV Globo)	Berlin und wir - (Germany) - (Imago TV/ZDF); Asquerosamente Rico - (Colombia) - (Echando Globos/Señal Colombia/ANTV); Miracle Lesson - (Japan) - (NHK/TV Man Union); Operation Ouch! - (United Kingdom) - (Maverick TV/CBBC)
Kids: Digital
Young Girls - (Norway) - (NRK); The Great Norwegian Build Off (Norway) - (NRK); Malhação: Seu Lugar no Mundo (Brazil) - (TV Globo); Why?! Programming (Japan) - (NHK)
