= Mr. Trance =

- Genre: Musical comedy
- Created by: Valerio Veneras
- Story by: Lilí Cabrera; Valerio Veneras
- Directed by: Lilí Cabrera; Valerio Veneras; Marta Toribio (art); Antonio Parrón (animation)
- Voices of: Carolina Muñoz Torres; Valerio Veneras; Rui Aires; Lilí Cabrera; José Arrieta Guerra; Nuan Gamer
- Theme music composer: Esteman
- Opening theme: "Mr. Trance", performed by Esteman Composer and singer from Bogotá
- Composers: Rui Aires, Fernando Luna,
- Country of origin: Colombia
- Original language: Spanish
- No. of seasons: 3
- No. of episodes: 52

Production
- Executive producers: Rocío Capador; Valerio Veneras
- Producers: Ricardo Cortés; Juliana Moreno
- Editors: Lilí Cabrera; Nadia Navarro
- Running time: 5 minutes
- Production company: El Recreo Studio

Original release
- Network: Señal Colombia
- Release: 15 September 2013 – 15 April 2019

Mr. Trance is a Colombian kids' animated series, created by Valerio Veneras and produced by El Recreo Studio for Señal Colombia, based on the 2002 radio program of Radio 3 (RNE) La hora Trance and the 2005 book Historias del Sr. Trance.

== Synopsis ==
Mr. Trance is not an ordinary citizen. He wears a purple suit and looks like a stylish sea urchin. Like everyone else, he faces daily problems, but he has a secret weapon to escape from these situations: his amazing imagination!

== Broadcast ==
The series was premiered on the channel Señal Colombia on September 13, 2013, exclusively for Colombia.

Cartoon Network Latin America acquired the international rights of the first season of the series and was premiered on October 5, 2015, for all of Latin America as part of its "Sabor Local" strategy, which consisted of broadcasting content made in the continent for audiences of the channel.

It has also been premiered in Colombia's Canal Guerra HD, Peru's Canal IPe and Chile's Novasur.

The third season premiered on April 15, 2019.

== Awards and nominations ==
Year	Award	Category	Nominee(s)	Result
2015	Premios India Catalina	Mejor programa infantil o juvenil		Won
2015	Premios India Catalina	Mejor música original	Esteman, Santiago Condomí, Pablo Parser.	Nominated
2016	International Emmy Kids Awards	Kids: Animation		Nominated
2017	Premios India Catalina	Mejor programa juvenil		Nominated
