= 53rd International Emmy Awards =

2025 awards ceremony

- Promotional poster
- Date: November 24, 2025
- Location: New York Hilton Midtown; New York City, NY
- Presented by: International Academy of Television Arts and Sciences
- Hosted by: Kelly Ripa; Mark Consuelos

The 53rd International Emmy Awards ceremony, presented by the International Academy of Television Arts & Sciences (IATAS), honored the best in international television programming from 2024. The awards ceremony was held live on November 24, 2025, at New York Hilton Midtown in New York City, with Kelly Ripa and Mark Consuelos hosting the event.

== Ceremony information ==
The nominations were announced on September 25, 2025, by the International Academy of Television Arts and Sciences. British drama Ludwig and Indian film Amar Singh Chamkila received the most nominations with two each. There are 64 nominees across 16 categories coming from 26 countries (the most ever for the awards), these being: Argentina, Australia, Brazil, Canada, Chile, Colombia, Denmark, Finland, France, Germany, Hong Kong — China, India, Israel, Japan, Kenya, Mexico, Norway, Qatar, Singapore, South Africa, South Korea, Spain, Sweden, Türkiye, United Arab Emirates, and the United Kingdom.

In addition to the regular awards for programming and performances, the Academy presented two special honors: Dana Walden, Co-Chairman of Disney Entertainment, received the 2025 International Emmy Founders Award in recognition of her transformative impact on the media and entertainment industry. João Roberto Marinho, Chairman of Grupo Globo, received the International Emmy Directorate Award in recognition of his leadership during Grupo Globo’s centennial and TV Globo’s 60th anniversary. This was the fourth time Globo has been recognized by the Academy: Roberto Marinho (1904–2003) received the award in 1976 and 1983, and Roberto Irineu Marinho received it in 2014.

== Categories presented ==
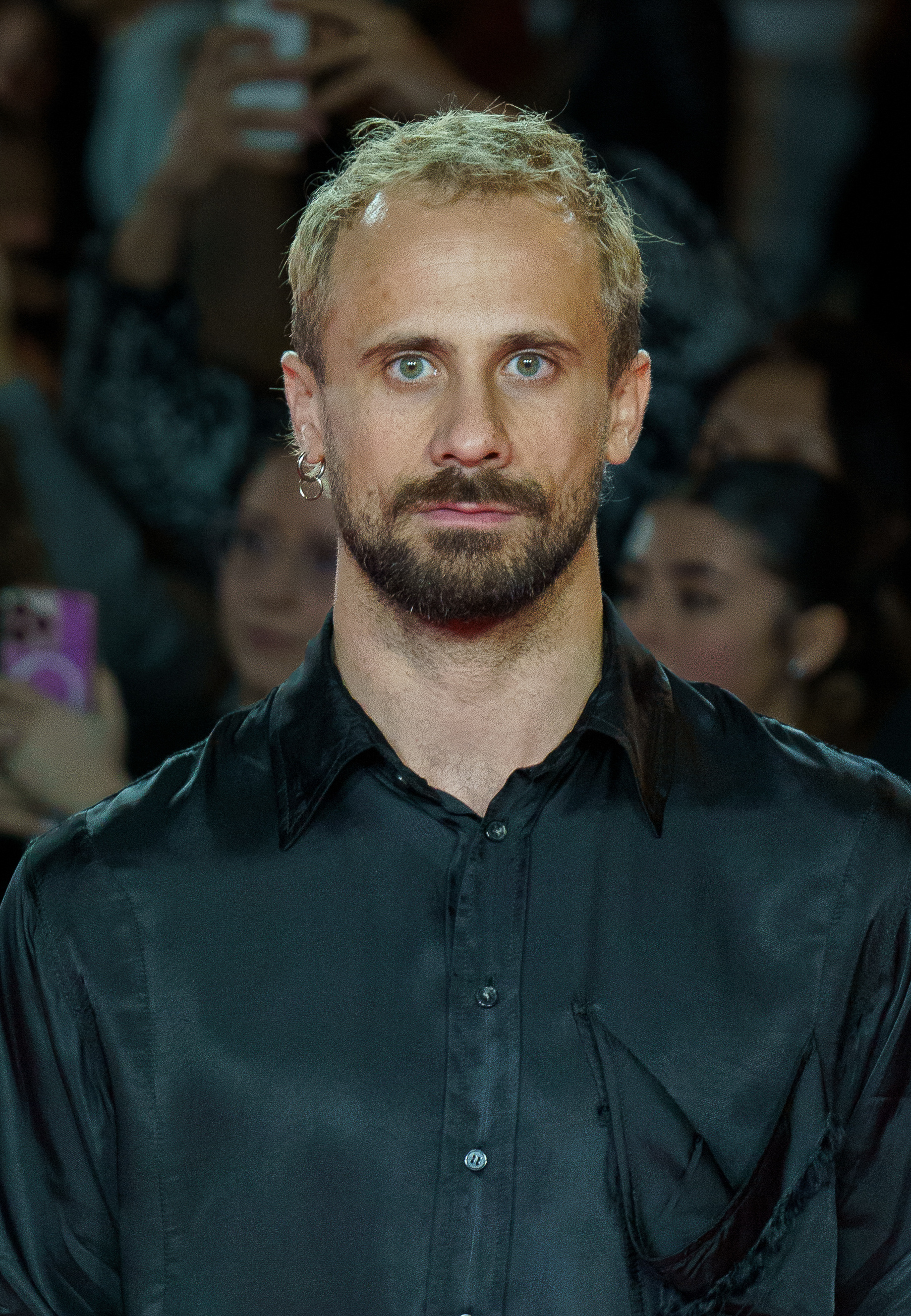
Oriol Pla, Best Actor Award recipient

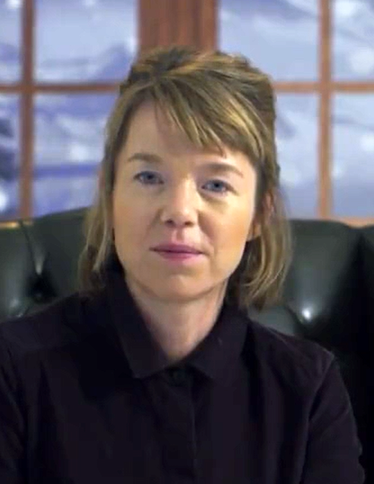
Anna Maxwell Martin, Best Actress Award recipient

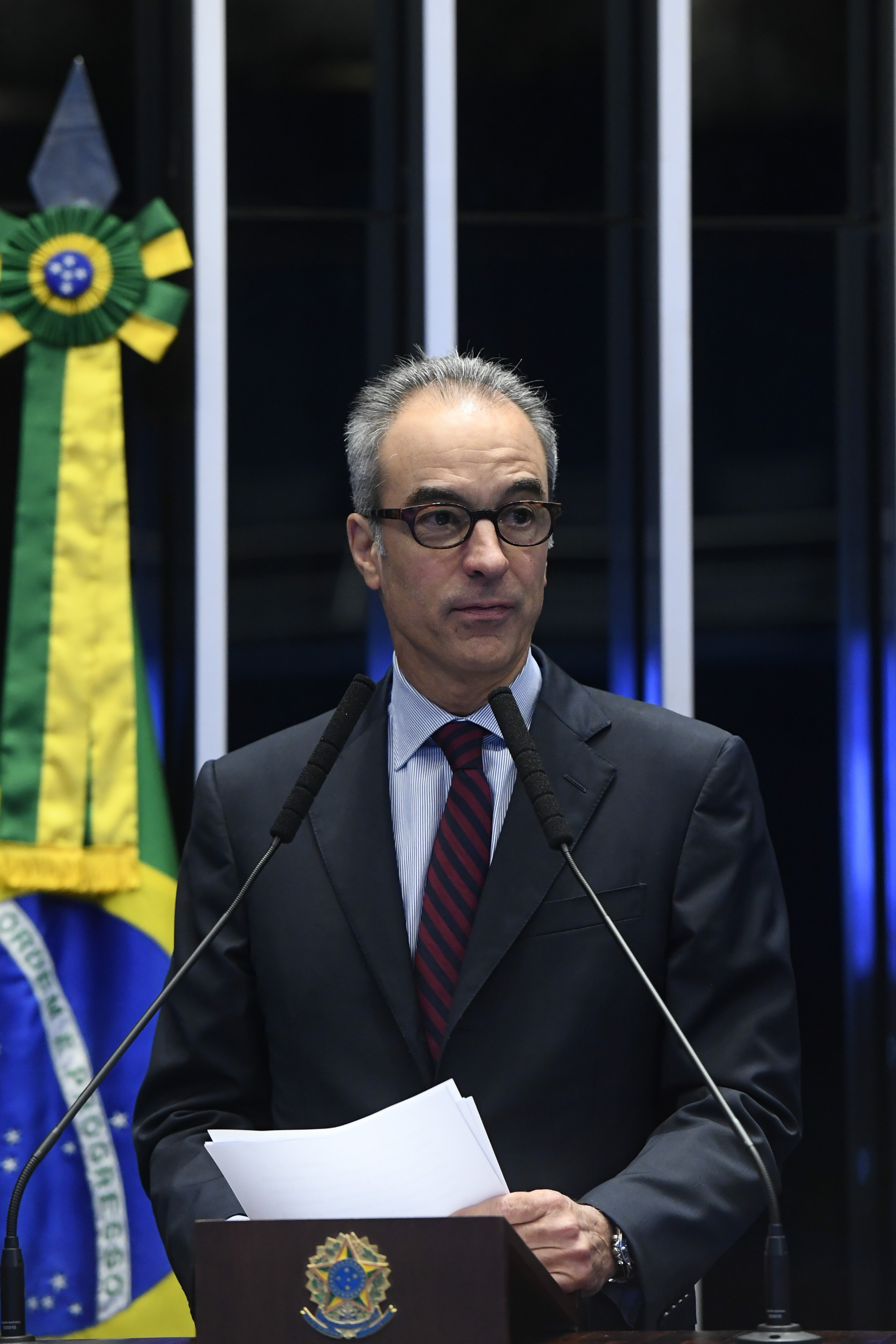
João Roberto Marinho, Directorate Award recipient

Best Drama Series	Best Comedy Series
(United Kingdom) Rivals (Happy Prince part of ITV Studios / Disney+); (Israel) Bad Boy (Sipur Studios / North Road Company / Tedy Production / Hot); (South Africa) Cake (Wolflight); (Mexico) Women in Blue (Lemon Studios / Apple TV+)	(United Kingdom) Ludwig (Big Talk Studios / That Mitchell & Webb Company); (South Korea) Chicken Nugget (Studio N / Plusmedia Entertainment / Netflix); (France) Iris (Les films entre 2 et 4 / Canal+); (Mexico) They Came at Night (3Pas / Visceral / ViX)
Best Performance by an Actor	Best Performance by an Actress
(Spain) Oriol Pla as Javier Giner in I, Addict (Alea Media / Disney+); (India) Diljit Dosanjh as Amar Singh Chamkila in Amar Singh Chamkila (Window Seat Films / Netflix); (United Kingdom) David Mitchell as Ludwig and James Taylor in Ludwig (Big Talk Studios / That Mitchell & Webb Company); (Colombia) Diego Vásquez as José Arcadio Buendía in One Hundred Years of Solitude (Dynamo Producciones / Netflix)	(United Kingdom) Anna Maxwell Martin as Delia Balmer in Until I Kill You (World Productions); (South Africa) Charlotte Hope as Micki Pistorius in Catch Me a Killer (Kowalski Films / LMP 51 / Showmax / Night Train Media); (Mexico) Carolina Miranda as Esmeralda in Mujeres asesinas (Pletora Productions / ViX); (Sweden) Maria Sid as Isa Stenberg in Pressure Point (Kärnfilm / Art & Bob)
Best TV Movie/Mini-Series	Best Telenovela
(United Kingdom) Lost Boys and Fairies (Duck Soup Films); (India) Amar Singh Chamkila (Window Seat Films / Netflix); (Germany) Herrhausen: The Banker and the Bomb (Sperl Film); (Chile) Victory or Death (Amazon MGM Studios / Parox S.A.)	(Turkey) The Good & The Bad (Ay Yapım); (Brazil) Crazy About You (TV Globo); (Spain) Return to Las Sabinas (Diagonal TV / Disney+); (Spain) Valle salvaje (StudioCanal)
Best Arts Programming	Best Documentary
(Japan) Ryuichi Sakamoto: Last Days (NHK); (United Kingdom) Art Matters with Melvyn Bragg (Oxford Films / Sky Arts); DJ Mehdi: Made In France (Ultra Magnetic / 360 Creative / Unité / Arte France); (Brazil) Herchcovitch; Exposed (Mood Hunter)	(United Kingdom) Hell Jumper (Expectation Entertainment for the BBC); (France) King of Kings: Chasing Edward Jones (Abelart Productions); (Brazil) It's My Pleasure (Amana Cine); (South Africa) School Ties
Best Short-Form Series	Best Non-Scripted Entertainment
(Canada) The Mediator (KOTV); Beyond Dancing (Radio Television Hong Kong); (Canada) My Dead Mom (LoCo Motion Pictures); (Argentina) Change is Everything (Warner Bros. Discovery / Buffalo Producciones)	(Denmark) Shaolin Heroes (Metronome Productions / Banijay / TV 2 Danmark); Big Brother Canada (Insight Productions); (United Arab Emirates) (Lebanon) Love Is Blind: Habibi (Imagic / Netflix); (Mexico) The Masked Singer (TelevisaUnivisión / Endemol Shine Boomdog)
Best News	Best Current Affairs
(Qatar) Gaza, Search for Life (Al Jazeera News Directorate); (Brazil) Fantástico: "El Salvador: Safety's Somber Side" (Globo); (United Kingdom) Sky News: "The Gangs of Haiti" (Sky News); (Sweden) Syria – The Truth Coming Out (TV4)	(United Kingdom) Dispatches: "Kill Zone: Inside Gaza" (Basement Films); (France) Philippines: Diving for Gold (Keyi Productions / Arte G.E.I.E); (Brazil) Repórter Record Investigação: "Enforced Disappearances" (Record TV / Playplus); (Singapore) Walk the Line (Mediacorp Pte Ltd)
Best Sports Documentary	Kids: Animation
(Spain) It's All Over: The Kiss That Changed Spanish Football (You First Originals); Argentina '78 (Disney+ Original Productions / Pampa Films); (South Africa) Chasing the Sun 2 (T+W); (United Kingdom) Sven (Whisper / Up & Away Film Entertainment / Prime Video)	(Australia) Bluey (Ludo Studio); (Singapore) Lamput (Warner Bros. Discovery / Vaibhav Studio / Robot Playground Media / Lil Critter Workshop / The Monk Studios / Tribe Audio / The Tuning Folk / Inspidea / Shapeshifter Studio); (Brazil) Lupi & Baduki (Flamma / Elo / Birdo); Moominvalley (Finland) (Gutsy Animations / YLE / SkyOne)
Kids: Factual	Kids: Live-Action
On Fritzi's Traces – What Was It Like in the GDR? (Balance Film GmbH / Germany Mitteldeutscher Rundfunk (MDR) / Westdeutscher Rundfunk (WDR)); (Brazil) Bora, O Pódio é Nosso (Globo / Sentimental Filmes); (United Kingdom) Kids Like Us (Echo Velvet); (South Africa) Playroom Live (Eclipse Television Productions)	(United Kingdom) Fallen (Globoplay / Night Train Media / Silver Reel / Hero Squared / Umedia); (Brazil) Luz (Floresta (Sony)); (Kenya) Prefects (Peripheral Vision International); (Norway) Shut UP (Alfredfilm / Feelgood SFT / Snowreel / Rabbit Films)
Directorate Award	Founders Award
João Roberto Marinho (President of Grupo Globo)	Dana Walden (Co-Chairman of Disney Entertainment)

== Multiple nominations ==
Multiple nominations by country
Nominations	Country
12	United Kingdom
8	Brazil
5	South Africa
4	France
4	Spain
4	Mexico
3	Canada
2	India
2	Argentina
2	Sweden
2	Singapore
2	Germany

== Multiple wins ==
Multiple wins by country
Wins	Country
7	United Kingdom
2	Spain
