= Freddie Mercury - The Final Act =

- Directed by: James Rogan
- Produced by: Dan Hall
- Edited by: Chris Wilson
- Music by: Tom Howe
- Production company: Rogan Productions
- Distributed by: BBC
- Release date: 27 November 2021
- Country: United Kingdom
- Language: English

Freddie Mercury - The Final Act is a 2021 British documentary directed by James Rogan and produced by Rogan Productions for the BBC.

== Synopsis ==
The documentary tells the story of Freddie Mercury's battle against HIV/AIDS and the fundraising concert that Queen held in his memory after his death, The Freddie Mercury Tribute Concert.

== Cast ==
- Freddie Mercury
- Brian May
- Roger Taylor
- Kashmira Bulsara
- Jonathan Weber
- Stuart Blizzard
- Peter Freestone
- Joe Elliott
- Lisa Stansfield
- Mark Pakianathan
- Anita Dobson
- Marc Thompson
- Mike Moran
- Peter Tatchell

== Release ==
The documentary was originally aired on November 27, 2021, on BBC Two. It is also available on BBC iPlayer.

== Critical reception ==
Anita Singh from The Telegraph gave the film a full five stars, writing that it offers "a moving tribute to our greatest showman".
