= Nivis, amigos de otro mundo =

- Genre: Comedy; Musical; Science Fiction
- Written by: Clara Ambrosini; Justina Lencina; Damián Fraticelli; Nora Mazzitelli
- Directed by: Emiliano Larre; Nicolás Rey
- Starring: Vinícius Campos; Lourdes Errante; Gustavo Masó; Claribel Medina; Clara Saccone; Valencia Steffens; Joaquina Zorrilla
- Voices of: Raul Anaya; Mateo Suárez; Liliana Barba; Pamela Mendoza
- Music by: Damián Mahier
- Opening theme: Amigos de Otro Mundo by Cast of Nivis & Izan Llunas
- Country of origin: Argentina
- Original language: Spanish
- No. of seasons: 2
- No. of episodes: 41

Production
- Producer: Maria Laura Moure
- Production locations: Buenos Aires, Federal District, Argentina
- Editor: José Lair; José Luís Ghezzi; Rocio Casas Maldonado; Geraldo Pérez; Soledad Martinez; Laureano Rizzo
- Production companies: Metrovision Producciones S.A. The Walt Disney Company Argentina

Original release
- Network: Disney Junior
- Release: July 20, 2019 – May 29, 2020

Nivis, amigos de otro mundo is an Argentine children's television series, produced by Metrovision Producciones S.A.. It was broadcast by Disney Junior Latin America on July 20, 2019, and May 29, 2020.

== Plot ==
After the Nivis family's holidays, they arrive on the planet Earth and accidentally hit the wall at three Amigos' house. The Nivis, a family from the planet Nivilux, arrive on Earth by accident when their ship crashes at the home of Amadeo, Felipe and Isabella. Over time, the extraterrestrial family, Blink, Nika, Baldo and Nox, co-exist with the human family and share funny and moving moments in the assembly of both worlds.

== Broadcast ==
The series began in Argentina on the Disney Junior Latin America channel on July 20, 2019. The second season of the series waspremiered on March 9, 2020, on the same channel. In November 2020, the series was available for streaming on Disney+ in Latin America.

== Cast and characters ==
NIVIS CAST

- Raul Anaya as Baldo
- Mateo Suaréz as Blink
- Liliana Barba as Nika
- Pamela Mendoza as Valentina (voice)

HUMANS CAST

- Vinícius Campos as Felipe Amigo
- Gustavo Masó as Amadeo Amigo
- Lourdes Errante as Isabella Amigo
- Valentina Steffens as Delfina
- Joaquina Zorrilla as Valentina
- Clara Saccone as Florencia
- Claribel Medina as Maria Soledad "Marisol"

== List of episodes ==
Season 1 (2019)

1. Vivendo con los Nivis
2. Brócolis en el espacio
3. La roca de Cristalix
4. Salvemos las pelotas
5. La trompa
6. Una mañana agitada
7. El Nuevo Amigo de Blink
8. El juego de las escondidas
9. La colección
10. ¡FUERA, NIVIS!
11. Hay que limpiar el cuarto
12. Soñando despierta
13. Valentina la espía
14. Tarde de juegos
15. La mermelada
16. El divertinivi
17. ¿Qué haríamos sin Felipe?
18. La celebración de la unión
19. El día del buen vecino
20. El libro de Felipe

Season 2 (2020)

1. La nave contraataca
2. Una visita inesperada
3. ¡Vamos a despegar!
4. Los celos de Felipe
5. Comida para Nox
6. Felipe, el misterioso
7. El misterio de las castañas
8. El plan de Blink
9. Las tres Isabellas
10. Vecinos solidarios
11. El celular
12. Las dos fiestas de cumpleaños
13. Un miedo de otro planeta
14. La competencia
15. El perdón
16. Las cocineras
17. Un pequeño héroe llamado Blink
18. El arquero fantasma
19. La entrevista
20. Hasta que se pongan de acuerdo
21. La despedida

== Soundtrack ==
Nivis, amigos de otro mundo

Soundtrack album by Various artists
- Released: June 28, 2019
- Genre: Children's; Pop music
- Length: 15:26
- Language: Spanish
- Label: Walt Disney

The soundtrack album was released on June 28, 2019, by Walt Disney Records on digital streaming, and contains eight songs in Spanish.

Track listing

No.	Title	Performer(s)	Length
1.	"Amigos de Otro Mundo"	Izan Llunas & Cast of Nivis	02:03
2.	"Estar en Familia"	Lourdes Errante, Gustavo Masó, Cast of Nivis and Vinicius Campos	02:02
3.	"Pata Pata"	Lourdes Errante, Cast of Nivis	01:54
4.	"Voy con mi Canción"	Lourdes Errante and Cast of Nivis	01:56
5.	"¿Es verdad o mentira?"	Lourdes Errante, Gustavo Masó, Cast of Nivis & Vinicius Campos	01:59
6.	"Tu amigo soy"	Lourdes Errante, Gustavo Masó, Vinicius Campos and Cast of Nivis	01:39
7.	"Sinfonía de Amadeo"	Lourdes Errante and Gustavo Masó	01:50
8.	"Amigos de Otro Mundo"	Vinicius Campos, Lourdes Errante, Gustavo Masó and Cast of Nivis	02:03
Total length:			15:26

=== Nivis, amigos de otro mundo – Vol. 2 ===
Nivis, amigos de otro mundo – Vol. 2

Soundtrack album by Various Artists
- Released: February 24, 2020
- Genre: Children's; Pop music
- Length: 13:44
- Language: Spanish
- Label: Walt Disney

The second soundtrack was released on February 24, 2020, in digital streaming format by Walt Disney Records, and contains seven songs.

Track listing

No.	Title	Performer(s)	Length
1.	"Los Nivis"	Mateo Suárez, Raúl Anaya, Liliana Barba	01:32
2.	"Al espacio"	Vinícius Campos, Mateo Suárez, Liliana Barba and Raúl Anaya	02:09
3.	"Elijo como Quiero Ser"	Lourdes Errante	02:10
4.	"Mi mascota"	Vinícius Campos, Lourdes Errante, Gustavo Masó, Mateo Suárez, Raúl Anaya and Liliana Barba	02:09
5.	"No me da miedo"	Vinicius Campos, Lourdes Errante, Gustavo Masó, Mateo Suárez, Liliana Barba and Raul Anaya	01:46
6.	"Nivialegría"	Vinicius Campos, Lourdes Errante, Gustavo Masó, Mateo Suárez, Liliana Barba and Raul Anaya	01:52
7.	"Se va terminando el día"	Vinicius Campos, Lourdes Errante, Gustavo Masó, Mateo Suárez, Liliana Barba and Raul Anaya	02:10
Total length:			13:44
