= 7th International Emmy Kids Awards =

2019 children's television awards

- Date: April 9, 2019
- Location: Carlton Hotel, Cannes, France

The 7th International Emmy Kids Awards ceremony, presented by the International Academy of Television Arts and Sciences (IATAS), took place on April 9, 2019 in Cannes, France. The nominations were announced on October 15, 2018. They are the only Emmys presented outside the U.S.

== Ceremony information ==
Nominations for the 7th International Emmy Kids Awards were announced on October 15, 2018 by the International Academy of Television Arts and Sciences (IATAS) during a press conference at MIPCOM in Cannes, France. The winners were announced on April 9, 2019 at the Carlton Hotel, in Cannes, France during MIPTV. The winners spanned series from Brazil, Norway, Sweden, the Netherlands and the United Kingdom.

== Winners ==
Kids: Animation	Kids: Preschool
Kop op - (Netherlands) - (Viking Film/VPRO TV/Job, Joris & Marieke); Dennis & Gnasher: Unleashed! - (United Kingdom) - (CBBC); Mini Beat Power Rockers - (Argentina) - (Discovery Kids/Mundo Loco Animation Studios); Oddbods - (Singapore) - (One Animation Pte)	Hey Duggee - (United Kingdom) (Studio AKA); The Show with the Elephant - (Germany) - (WDR/Trickstudio Lutterbeck); Lily's Driftwood Bay - (United Kingdom) (Sixteen South Studios); Luo Bao Bei - (China) - (Magic Mall/Cloth Cat/9 Story Distribution)
Kids: Series	Kids: TV Movie/Mini-Series
Malhação: Viva a Diferença (Brazil) (TV Globo); Mustangs FC (Australia) - (Matchbox Pictures); Jenny (Canada) - (Productions Avenida); Die Pfefferkoerner (Germany) - (Tellux Film/Sad Origami/ZDF)	Ratburger - (United Kingdom) - (King Bert Productions); Fairy Tales in Court - (Japan) - (NHK); Dschermeni - (Germany) - (Tellux Film/Sad Origami/ZDF); A Grande Viagem - (Brazil) - (Aurora Filmes/Haikai Filmes)
Kids: Non-Scripted Entertainment	Kids: Factual
Fixa Bröllopet - (Sweden) - (Fremantlemedia Sverige); Ali-A’s Superchargersn - (United Kingdom) - (Endemol Shine); Little Masters - (China) - (Shanghai Canxing Culture/Canxing Production); The Voice Kids - (Brazil) - (TV Globo)	My Life: Born to Vlog - (United Kingdom) - (Blakeway North); Las Mil y Una Notas - (Mexico) - (Orquesta Filarmonica de Toluca/Instituto de Cultura del Estado de Mexico); Kroppen Min eier Jeg - (Norway) - (Bivrost film & tv); Good Host - (Singapore) - (Oak 3 Films Pte/Mediacorp)
Kids: Digital
Overgrep - (Norway) - (NRK); # On the Night of August 31st (Japan) - (NHK); Jenter (Norway) - (NRK); Secret Life of Boys (United Kingdom) - (Zodiak Kids Studios/CBBC/ABC)
