= International Emmy Kids Awards =

Children's television programming award

- Awarded for: Excellence in international children's programming
- Country: United States
- Presented by: International Academy of Television Arts and Sciences
- First award: February 8, 2013
- Website: www.iemmys.tv

The International Emmy Kids Awards, founded in New York City in 2013, recognize excellence in international children's programming produced initially outside the United States, and are presented annually by International Academy of Television Arts and Sciences. The awards were presented in separate ceremonies until 2021 and in conjunction with the International Emmy gala starting the following year.

== History ==
In previous years, the International Academy had presented a single award for children's programming (Best Children & Young People) at its main International Emmy gala in November. In 2013, the academy decided to set up a separate ceremony, with International Emmy Kids Awards handed out in six categories to honor outstanding children's TV programming outside the U.S.

Nominations for the 1st International Emmy Kids Awards were announced on October 8, 2012, by the International Academy of Television Arts & Sciences at a Press Conference at MIPCOM, in Cannes.

In 2020, the International Academy reduced the categories presented to just three: animation, factual & entertainment, and live-action series.

== Award categories ==
- Kids: Animation
- Kids: Factual & Entertainment
- Kids: Live-Action

== See also ==
- Children's and Family Emmy Awards
