= 8th International Emmy Kids Awards =

2020 children's television awards

- Date: March 31, 2020
- Presented by: International Academy of Television Arts and Sciences

The 8th International Emmy Kids Awards ceremony, presented by the International Academy of Television Arts and Sciences (IATAS), took place on March 31, 2020. The nominations were announced on October 14, 2019.

The year 2020 was exceptional for the International Emmy Kids Awards with Academy hosting two ceremonies online for the first time in same year.

== Ceremony information ==
Nominations for the 8th International Emmy Kids Awards were announced on October 14, 2019 by the International Academy of Television Arts and Sciences (IATAS) during a press conference at MIPCOM in Cannes, France. The winners were announced on March 31, 2020. The winners spanned series from Australia, Belgium, Brazil, Norway, the Netherlands and the United Kingdom. Due to the COVID-19 pandemic, International Academy canceled the award ceremony and the winners were announced via Facebook, Twitter and Instagram.

== Winners ==
Kids: Animation	Kids: Preschool
Zog - (United Kingdom) - (Magic Light Pictures); Grizzy & the Lemmings - (France) - (Hari Productions); Jorel's Brother - (Brazil) - (Copa Studio/Cartoon Network); Lamput - (India) - (Vaibhav Studios/Cartoon Network)	Bluey - (Australia) (Ludo Studios); Animanimals - (Germany) - (Studio Filmbilder/KiKA/ARD/ZDF/SWR); Petit - (Chile) (Pájaro/NonStop/Pakapaka/Señal Colombia); Super Wings - (South Korea) - (FunnyFlux/Alpha/EBS)
Kids: Series	Kids: TV Movie/Mini-Series
De Regels van Floor (Netherlands) (NL Film/VPRO Television); Guru Paarvai 4 (Singapore) - (Blue River Pictures); Jamie Johnson (United Kingdom) - (Short Form Film Company); Malhação: Vidas Brasileiras (Brazil) - (TV Globo)	Jacqueline Wilson’s Katy - (United Kingdom) - (BBC Children’s Productions/CBBC); Der Krieg und ich - (Germany) - (KiKa); Joe All Alone - (United Kingdom) - (Zodiak Kids Studio/CBBC); Just Dance - (South Korea) - (KBS)
Kids: Non-Scripted Entertainment	Kids: Factual
Nachtraven - (Belgium) - (De Mensen/Ketnet (VRT)); Hua Na Ha Kuob - (Thailand) - (Thai Broadcasting Company); Lego Masters - (United Kingdom) - (Tuesday’s Child); The Voice Kids - (Brazil) - (TV Globo)	Nosso Sangue, Nosso Corpo - (Brazil) - (Fox Lab Brazil/Your Mama); Ultras Like-Eksperiment - (Denmark) - (STV Productions); My Life: Hike to Happiness - (United Kingdom) - (Nine Lives Media/The Wilderness Foundation); What's New? - (Nigeria) - (BBC Africa)
Kids: Digital
Lik Meg - (Norway) - (NRK); Malhação Ao Vivo (Brazil) - (TV Globo); MarcoPolo World School (United Kingdom) - (MarcoPolo Learning); Ultra Nyt (Denmark) - (DR)
