= 3rd International Emmy Kids Awards =

2015 children's television awards

- Date: February 20, 2015
- Location: Pier 60, Chelsea Piers, New York City, NY

The 3rd International Emmy Kids Awards ceremony, presented by the International Academy of Television Arts and Sciences (IATAS), took place on February 20, 2015 in New York City. The nominations were announced on October 8, 2014.

== Ceremony information ==
Nominations for the 3rd International Emmy Kids Awards were announced on October 8, 2014 by the International Academy of Television Arts and Sciences (IATAS). The winners were announced on February 20, 2015 at a ceremony in New York City. The winners spanned series from Chile, France, Spain, Sweden, The Netherlands and the United Kingdom.

== Winners ==
Kids: Animation	Kids: Preschool
The Jungle Bunch - (France) - (TAT Productions/Master Films); The Amazing Journey of Zamba - (Argentina) - (Canal Paka Paka); Burka Avenger - (Pakistan) - (Unicorn Black); Strange Hill High - (United Kingdom) - (FremantleMedia/CBBC/Factory Transmedia)	Mike the Knight - (United Kingdom) (HIT Entertainment/Nelvana); MK-X - (Norway) - (NRK); Plaza Sésamo: Monstruos en Red - (Colombia) (&2 Producciones/Sesame Workshop/MinTIC/Canal 13); TV Playhouse Tappity Tap - (South Korea) - (KBS)
Kids: Series	Kids: TV Movie/Mini-Series
Polseres vermelles (Spain) (Televisió de Catalunya/Castelao Pictures); Dance Academy (Australia) - (Werner Film Productions/ABC/ZDF); Nowhere Boys (Australia) - (Matchbox Pictures); Gaby Estrella (Brazil) - (Gloob/Globosat)	Alles mag - (Netherlands) - (BIND/VPRO); Against the Wild - (Canada) - (Against The Wild Films); The Devil with the three Golden Hairs - (Germany) - (Bavaria Film/ARD/SWR)
Kids: Non-Scripted Entertainment	Kids: Factual
Wild Kids - (Sweden) - (Jarowskij/SVT); Dienstags ein Held sein - (Germany) - (Gigaherz/SWR); Let's Get Inventin' - (New Zealand) - (Luke Nola & Friends); Where Are We Going, Dad? - (South Korea) - (MBC)	¿Con qué sueñas? - (Chile) - (Mi Chica Producciones/CNTV/TVN); Heart & Soul - (Australia) - (1440 Productions); Snoffe, döden och jag - (Sweden) - (Dokumentärministeriet/SVT); Think like a Crow! - The Scientific method - (Japan) - (NHK)
