= 9th International Emmy Kids Awards =

2020 children's television awards

- Date: October 14, 2020
- Presented by: International Academy of Television Arts and Sciences

The 9th International Emmy Kids Awards ceremony, presented by the International Academy of Television Arts and Sciences (IATAS), took place on October 14, 2020. The nominations were announced on September 10, 2020.

== Ceremony information ==
Nominations for the 9th International Emmy Kids Awards were announced on September 10, 2020 by the International Academy of Television Arts and Sciences (IATAS). The winners were announced on October 14, 2020. The winners spanned series from Australia and the United Kingdom. This is the second time this year that the Academy has presented Kids Emmys; the accelerated schedule is due to various factors related to the Covid-19 virus.

== Winners ==
Kids: Animation	Kids: Factual & Entertainment
The Tiger Who Came to Tea - (United Kingdom) (Lupus Films); Ico Bit Zip - (Brazil) - (National Geographic/Copa Studio); Oddbods - (Singapore) - (One Animation); Moominvalley - (Finland) - (Gutsy Animations)	Finding My Family: Holocaust – A Newsround Special - (United Kingdom) (BBC Children's Productions/CBBC); Opa Popa Dupa - (Mexico) - (Nat Geo Kids/Estudios Telemexico); My Notebooks – Seven Years of Tiny Great Adventures - (Japan) (NHK); World’s Worst Diseases - (Sweden) - (Delta Studios)
Kids: Live-Action
Hardball (Australia) (Northern Pictures); Juacas (Brazil) - (Walt Disney Company/Cine Filmes); Dropje (Netherlands) - (NTR Television/Submarine); Extraordinary You (South Korea) - (MBC)
