= 1st International Emmy Kids Awards =

2013 children's television awards

- Date: February 8, 2013
- Location: The Lighthouse at Chelsea Piers, New York City, NY

The first International Emmy Kids Awards ceremony, presented by the International Academy of Television Arts and Sciences (IATAS), took place on February 8, 2013, in New York City. The nominations were announced on October 8, 2012.

The award ceremony was created to recognize excellence in children's television programming that was originally produced and aired outside of the United States.

== Ceremony information ==
Nominations for the first International Emmy Kids Awards ceremony were announced on October 8, 2012, by the International Academy of Television Arts and Sciences (IATAS) during a press conference at MIPCOM in Cannes, France. The winners were announced on February 8, 2013, at a ceremony in New York City. The winning programs came from Argentina, Japan, Norway, and the United Kingdom.

== Winners ==
Kids: Animation	Kids: Preschool
El jardín de Clarilú - (Argentina) - (Walt Disney Company/Triada/Metrovisión); Cloudbread - (South Korea) - (KBS/GIMC); Leserkorpset - (Norway) - (NRK); Octonauts - (United Kingdom) - (BBC Children's/Silvergate Media/Brown Bag Films/CBeebies)	The Amazing World of Gumball - (United Kingdom) (Turner Broadcasting); Ask Lara - (Spain) - (Tomavistas/Televisió de Catalunya/Red Kite Animations/Submarine); Digimon Xros Wars - (Japan) (Toei Animation/TV Asahi); The Jungle Bunch - (France) - (TAT productions/Master Films/Vanilla Seed)
Kids: Series	Kids: TV Movie/Mini-Series
Junior High School Diaries: Harmony of Two (Japan) (NHK); Julie e os Fantasmas (Brazil) - (Mixer/TV Bandeirantes/Nickelodeon); SLiDE (Australia) - (Hoodlum/Playmaker Media/Fox 8/Foxtel); Stikk (Norway) - (Nordisk Film TV/NRK/SVT/DR/RUV)	Lost Christmas - (United Kingdom) - (Impact Productions/BBC/Ketchup Entertainment); Fairy Tales on TV - (South Korea) - (EBS); The Star Talers - (Germany) - (Südwestrundfunk/Bavaria Film); The Strongest Man in Holland (Netherlands) - (NPO/NL Film & TV)
Kids: Non-Scripted Entertainment	Kids: Factual
All-Round Champion - (Norway) - (Fabelaktiv/Enova/NRK/Film 3); Art Attack - (Brazil) - (Walt Disney Company); In Real Life - (Canada) - (Apartment 11 Productions/YTV); Wittaya Subprayuth - (Thailand) - (Workpoint Entertainment/Channel 5)	My Autism and Me - (United Kingdom) - (BBC Children's/CBBC); The Dreaming Orchestra's 180 Days - (South Korea) - (KBS); Coming Out - (Netherlands) - (NPO/Sky High TV); Mentira la Verdad - (Argentina) - (Mulata Films/Canal Encuentro)
