= 2nd International Emmy Kids Awards =

2014 children's television awards

- Date: February 10, 2014
- Location: Pier 60, Chelsea Piers, New York City, NY

The 2nd International Emmy Kids Awards ceremony, presented by the International Academy of Television Arts and Sciences (IATAS) took place on February 10, 2014, in New York City. The nominations were announced on October 3, 2013.

== Ceremony information ==
Nominations for the 2nd International Emmy Kids Awards were announced by the International Academy of Television Arts and Sciences (IATAS) during a press conference at MIPCOM in Cannes, France. The winners were announced on February 10, 2014, at a ceremony in New York City. The winning programs came from Brazil, Canada, and the United Kingdom.

== Winners ==
Kids: Animation	Kids: Preschool
Room on a Broom - (United Kingdom) - (Walt Disney Company/Triada/Metrovisión); Angelo Rules - (France) - (TeamTO/CAKE Entertainment/France Télévisions/Télétoon); Spike 2 - (France) - (TAT productions/Master Films); Larva - (South Korea) - (KBS/Tuba Entertainment/SK Broadband)	Ben & Holly's Little Kingdom - (United Kingdom) (Entertainment One/Astley Baker Davies); Box Head - (Denmark) - (DR TV); Pororo the Little Penguin - (South Korea) (Iconix Entertainment/Ocon/EBS/SK Broadband); Zou - (France) - (Cybergroup Studios/Scrawl Studios)
Kids: Series	Kids: TV Movie/Mini-Series
Pedro & Bianca (Brazil) (TV Cultura); Limbo (Denmark) - (DR TV); Junior High School Diaries (Japan) - (NHK); Beat Girl (Ireland) - (BeActive International/BeActive Portugal)	The Phantoms - (Canada) - (Dream Street Pictures); Against the Wild - (Canada) - (Against The Wild Films); A Grandson from America - (China) - (China Movie Channel); Mimoun (Netherlands) - (NPO/Stetz Film)
Kids: Non-Scripted Entertainment	Kids: Factual
Pet School - (United Kingdom) - (Cineflix Pet School); That's My Art! - (Belgium) - (De Mensen); Labyrinth - (Sweden) - (Sveriges Television); Battle for Money: The Initial Battle - (Japan) - (Fuji Television)	Same But Different - (United Kingdom) - (Libra Television/David & Goliath); The Kamaishi Miracle - (Japan) - (NHK); My Father - (Netherlands) - (NPO/Idea Productions); Truth Lies - (Argentina) - (Mulata Films/Canal Encuentro)
