= Anonymously Yours =

- Netflix release poster
- Spanish: Anónima
- Directed by: Maria Torres
- Starring: Annie Cabello; Ralf Morales; Estefi Merelles; Harold Azuara; Alicia Vélez
- Distributed by: Netflix
- Release date: 2021
- Running time: 100 minutes
- Country: Mexico
- Language: Spanish

Anonymously Yours (Spanish: Anónima) is a 2021 Mexican romantic comedy-drama film directed by Maria Torres and starring Annie Cabello and Ralf Morales. It was released on Netflix on December 10, 2021.

== Synopsis ==
Anonymously Yours focuses on a high school romance, how long could someone realistically go before they realize that the person they’re texting is right beside them? The film is about two high schoolers who start a digital friendship. The twist is, they have no idea that they’re speaking to an individual who they are annoyed by in real life. The two leading characters, Alex (Ralf) and Vale (Annie), both have their own issues, a fact only made worse as they attempt to navigate through high school and towards the end of year prom. To help them through their issues, they strike up a friendship with an “anonymous” contact, which soon develops into romantic feelings.

== Cast ==
- Annie Cabello as Valeria "Vale" Ontiveros, A high school senior, Vale forms a deep connection through mutually anonymous texts with classmate Alex, who she can’t stand in real life. Meanwhile, she dreams of making films, but her parents want her to join their elevator company.
- Ralf Morales as Alex, Coming from a middle-class background, Alex feels like an outsider as a new student at an upscale high school. Hesitant to make new friends, Alex prefers texting anonymously with Vale, who he clashes with in person.
- Estefi Merelles as Regina, Unlike her best friend, Regina is outgoing, athletic and carefree. She is always there to listen and give dating advice, even if she doesn’t completely get Vale’s sense of humor.
- Harold Azuara as Ritchie, Regina’s brother and a bit immature and prone to filming himself acting foolish for his social media followers. Offended by Alex’s lack of interest in being his friend, Ritchie initially takes a hostile stance toward him.
- Alicia Vélez as Lina, Alex’s best friend from his former high school, Lina understands and respects his standoffish nature, even if she thinks he’s a bit of a nerd. Skeptical of Alex’s digital romance, she pushes him to get out of his head.
