= 5th International Emmy Kids Awards =

2017 children's television awards

- Date: April 4, 2017
- Location: Martinez Hotel, Cannes, France

The 5th International Emmy Kids Awards ceremony, presented by the International Academy of Television Arts and Sciences (IATAS), took place on April 4, 2017 in Cannes, France. The nominations were announced on October 17, 2016. They are the only Emmys presented outside the U.S.

== Ceremony information ==
Nominations for the 5th International Emmy Kids Awards were announced on October 17, 2016 by the International Academy of Television Arts and Sciences (IATAS) during a press conference at MIPCOM in Cannes, France. The winners were announced on April 4, 2017 at the Martinez Hotel, in Cannes during MIPTV. The winners spanned series from Australia, Denmark, the Netherlands and the United Kingdom.

== Winners ==
Kids: Animation	Kids: Preschool
Shaun the Sheep: The Farmer's Llamas - (United Kingdom) - (Aardman Animations); Peanuts - (France) - (Normaal animation/Peanuts Worldwide/Iconix Brand Group); SOS Fada Manu - (Brazil) - (Gloob/Boutique Filmes); Larva in New York - (South Korea) - (TUBA n)	Hey Duggee - (United Kingdom) (Studio AKA); Molang - (France) - (Millimages/Teidees Audiovisuals/Canal Plus); O Show da Luna! - (Brazil) (TV Pinguim/Discovery Networks); Super Wings - (South Korea) - (FunnyFlux/QianQi/EBS)
Kids: Series	Kids: TV Movie/Mini-Series
Casper and the Christmas Angels (Netherlands) (NL Film & TV/Avrotros); Presentes – Temporada II (Argentina) - (Canal Encuentro/Mulata Films); Ready for This' (Australia) - (Blackfella Films/Werner Film/ACTF/ABC); Hank Zipzer (United Kingdom) - (Kindle Entertainment/DHX Media/Walker Productions/Screen Yorkshire)	Peter & Wendy: Based on the Novel Peter Pan by J.M. Barrie - (United Kingdom) - (Headline Pictures/Juliette Films); Die Salzprinzessin - (Germany) - (Askania Media Film/ARD Degeto/WDR); Dede: Mehmet Met de Gele Laarzen - (Netherlands) - (Corrino Media/KRO-NCRV/Z@pp/Mediafonds); Die Weisse Schlange - (Germany) - (ZDF/Provobis/Metafilm)
Kids: Non-Scripted Entertainment	Kids: Factual
Ultras Sorte Kageshow - (Denmark) - (DR); Cinemaniacs - (United Kingdom) - (Novel Entertainment); Look Kool - (Canada) - (Apartment 11 Productions/TVOKids); Tem Criança na Cozinha - (Brazil) - (Gloob/Samba Filmes)	Horrible Histories - (United Kingdom) - (Lion Television); Sueños Latinoamericanos - (Chile) - (Mi Chica Producciones/Canal 13/CNTV); Wild But True - (Singapore) - (Discovery Networks/Beyond Screen Production/Screen Queensland); Full Proof – Koepels - (Netherlands) - (NTR)
Kids: Digital
Doodles - (Australia) - (Ludo Studio/ABC3/Screen Australia); Face TV (Japan) - (NRK); Malhação: Sonhos (Brazil) - (TV Globo); Gaming Show Interactive – The Gaming Show (Canada) - (Secret Location/Banger Films/DHX Media)
