= 4th International Emmy Kids Awards =

2016 children's television awards

- Date: April 5, 2016
- Location: Carlton Hotel, Cannes, France

The 4th International Emmy Kids Awards ceremony, presented by the International Academy of Television Arts and Sciences (IATAS), took place on April 5, 2016 in Cannes, France. The nominations were announced on October 2, 2015.

== Ceremony information ==
Nominations for the 4th International Emmy Kids Awards were announced on October 2, 2015 by the International Academy of Television Arts and Sciences (IATAS) during a press conference at MIPCOM in Cannes, France. The winners were announced on April 5, 2016 at the Carlton Hotel, in Cannes during MIPTV. The winners spanned series from Australia, Japan, Norway, The Netherlands and the United Kingdom.

== Winners ==
Kids: Animation	Kids: Preschool
Ronja, the Robber's Daughter - (Japan) - (NHK/Dwango/Polygon Pictures); Mr. Trance - (Colombia) - (El Recreo Studio/Señal Colombia); Get Ace - (Australia) - (Galaxy Pop); Le Trésor du Vieux Jim - (France) - (TAT Productions/Master Films)	Bing - (United Kingdom) (Acamar Films Production/Brown Bag Films); LazyTown - (Iceland) - (Cartoonito/TBS Europe); O Zoo da Zu - (Brazil) (Discovery Latin America/Boutique Filmes); Shimajirō no Wow! - (Japan) - (Benesse Corporation/TV Setouchi/Dentsu/DASH/demand/The Answerstudio)
Kids: Series	Kids: TV Movie/Mini-Series
Nowhere Boys (Australia) (Matchbox Pictures); Malhação Sonhos (Brazil) - (TV Globo); Braccialetti rossi (Italy) - (RAI/Palomar/Big Bang Media); Taart (Netherlands) - (VPRO Television/Pupkin Films)	Rabarber - (Netherlands) - (NL Film & TV/KRO-NCRV); Evermoor - (United Kingdom) - (Lime Pictures/Disney Channels); Jongens - (Netherlands) - (NTR/Pupkin Fi lm); Spelling Armadillo - (Singapore) - (Oak3 Films)
Kids: Non-Scripted Entertainment	Kids: Factual
Allround Champion - (Norway) - (NRK); Battle for Money: Return of the Dinosaurs - (Japan) - (Fuji Television); The Big Performance 3 - (United Kingdom) - (Twenty Twenty Productions/CBBC); Undercover High - (Canada) - (General Purpose Entertainment)	My Life: I Am Leo - (United Kingdom) - (Nine Lives Media); Mentira la verdad - (Argentina) - (Mulata Films/Canal Encuentro); Kore-eda x High School Girls: Portrait of Fukushima 3 Years After - (Japan) - (NHK/Paonetwork); De Zandtovenaar en de Oorlog - (Netherlands) - (The Media Brothers/Rkk/JBS TV)
