= 10th International Emmy Kids Awards =

2021 children's television awards

- Date: October 12, 2020
- Presented by: International Academy of Television Arts and Sciences

The 10th International Emmy Kids Awards ceremony, presented by the International Academy of Television Arts and Sciences (IATAS), took place on October 12, 2021. The nominations were announced on September 7, 2021.

== Ceremony information ==
Nominations for the 10th International Emmy Kids Awards were announced on September 7, 2021 by the International Academy of Television Arts and Sciences (IATAS). The winners were announced on October 12, 2021. The announcement was made during an online presentation on the Academy’s website during MipJunior.

== Winners ==
Kids: Animation	Kids: Factual & Entertainment
Shaun the Sheep: Adventures from Mossy Bottom - (United Kingdom) (Aardman); Mush-Mush and The Mushables - (France) - (La Cabane/Thuristar); Petit - (Chile) - (Pájaro/NonStop/Pakapaka/Señal Colombia); Tish Tash - (South Korea) - (Studio Gale/Big Crunch/EBS)	Scars of Life - (Belgium) (De Mensen); The Voice Kids - (Brazil) - (TV Globo); My Life: Picture Perfect - (United Kingdom) (Big Deal Films); Ahlan Simsim - (Jordan) - (Sesame Workshop/Jordan Pioneers)
Kids: Live-Action
First Day (Australia) (Epic Films/Australian Children’s Television Foundation); Gameboys (Philippines) - (The IdeaFirst Company); Heirs Of The Night (Germany) - (Scope Pictures/ZDF Enterprises); Nivis Amigos de otro mundo (Argentina) - (Buena Vista International/Metrovision/Non Stop Digital)
