= Jamie Johnson (TV series) =

British children's television show, 2016–

- Promotional cover for series 1
- Genre: Children's drama
- Created by: Dan Freedman
- Based on: Jamie Johnson by Dan Freedman
- Written by: Shaun Duggan
- Directed by: Joe Talbot
- Starring: Louis Dunn; Jonnie Kimmins; Patrick Ward; Emma Stansfield; Tim Dantay
- Composer: Rob Manning
- Country of origin: United Kingdom
- Original language: English
- No. of series: 7
- No. of episodes: 66 (+ 10 special episodes)

Production
- Executive producer: Sue Nott
- Producer: Sam Talbot
- Production locations: Port Talbot, Wales (Series 4–7); Nottingham, England (Series 1–3)
- Running time: 27–28 minutes
- Production companies: Short Form Film; BBC Studios Kids & Family

Original release
- Network: CBBC
- Release: 8 June 2016 – 17 November 2022

Related
- Jamie Johnson FC

Jamie Johnson is a British children's drama television broadcast on CBBC from 8 June 2016 to 17 November 2022, created by Dan Freedman based on his novel series of the same name. The series followed the self-titled character, portrayed by Louis Dunn, as he negotiates secondary school and issues at home, along with being a talented footballer. A spin-off series, Jamie Johnson FC, set in the world of elite academy football, was released in 2023.

The show features several cameo appearances from footballers past and present, including Gary Lineker, Steph Houghton, Marcus Rashford, Raheem Sterling, Luis Suárez and Vincent Kompany.

== Synopsis ==
Jamie Johnson is a seriously gifted footballer capable of going all the way. But after his dad walks out on them, Jamie and his mother are forced to move in with Jamie's grandfather, meaning Jamie has to start at a new school. He makes friends with Jack and Boggy but makes an enemy of Dillon and struggles to impress football coach, Mr Hansard.

The series has had many very special episodes, covering topics such as bullying, sexism, cheating, blackmail, relationships, diabetes, homelessness, multiple sclerosis, racism, crime and homophobia.

The plot is loosely based on the storyline in the book series of the same name, written author by Dan Freedman, using some of the characters in the books.

== Cast and characters ==
Character	Played by	Series						
Character	Played by	1	2	3	4	5	6	7
Jamie Johnson	Louis Dunn	Main	Main	Main	Main	Main	Main	Main
Jacqueline "Jack" Marshall	Olivia Lava/Lenna Gunning Williams	Main	Main	Main	Recurring	Recurring		
Hugo "Boggy" Bogson	Jonnie Kimmins	Main	Main	Main	Main	Main	Main	Recurring
Dillon Simmonds	Patrick Ward	Main	Main	Main	Main	Main	Guest	
Harry Hansard	Theo Chapman	Main	Main					
Karen Johnson	Emma Stansfield	Main	Main	Main	Main	Main		
Mike Johnson	Tim Dantay	Main	Main	Main	Main	Main	Main	Main
Mr. Hilary Hansard	Brian Bovell	Main	Main	Main				Guest
Ian Reacher	Santiago Mosquera/William Fox	Guest	Recurring	Recurring	Recurring	Recurring	Recurring	Recurring
Indira Cave	Millie Gibson		Main	Main				
Ms. R Savage	Lucy Speed		Main	Main				
Nancy	Ellie Daley		Recurring	Main	Guest			
Jethro Stevenson	Miles Wallace		Recurring	Main		Recurring		
Zoe Moore	Maddie Murchinson			Main	Main	Main		
Walter "Wozza" Worthington	Jermaine Johnson			Main	Recurring		Guest	
Sienna Jones	Ellie Botterill				Main			
Alba Osborne	Elena Cole				Main	Main	Main	Main
Eric Atlee	Morgan Hudson				Main	Main		
Freddie Seo	Keaton Edmund				Main	Main	Main	Main
Molly Sinkamba	Thanyia Moore				Main			
Duncan Jones	Glen Wallace				Main	Recurring	Recurring	Recurring
Ruby Osborne	Zoe Hall				Main	Main		
Liam Simmonds	Haydn Craven				Recurring	Main	Main	Main
Jake Wilson	Louie Theaker						Main	Main
Kasia Antol	Elliot Malone						Main	Main
Tayo Akinola	Jarmaine Muganiwa						Main	Main
Jess Christie	Natali McCleary						Main	Main
Sam Bickworth	Jessica McHale						Main	Main
Bex Harris	Gracie Grosvenor						Main	Main
Karim Memon	Dillon Bains							Main
Maddy Kingston	Olivia Chomczuk							Main
Mukhtar "Mukki" Hamid	Ayham Kabi							Main
Uzma Memon	Iyla Sundarsingh McKaig							Recurring

== Episodes ==
Series	Episodes	Originally released	
Series	Episodes	First released	Last released
1	3	8 June 2016	22 June 2016
2	10	5 April 2017	7 June 2017
3	10	5 April 2018	7 June 2018
4	13	11 April 2019	29 June 2019
5	13	7 May 2020	30 July 2020
6	13	25 October 2021	6 December 2021
7	13	12 October 2022	17 November 2022

=== Series 1 (2016) ===
In the series Jeremy is played by Jonathan Race and Jack Marshall is played by Olivia Lava. This would be the only time Jonathan Race and Olivia Lava are able to play these characters as they are replaced by Andrew Williams and Lenna Gunning Williams in the following series. Ian Reacher is played by Santiago Mosquera for only this series.

No. overall	No. in series	Title	Directed by	Written by	Original release date
1	1	"Debut"	Joe Talbot	Shaun Duggan	8 June 2016
Jamie has to start at a new school mid-term. With his amazing football talent, Jamie should have no problem fitting in with the cool kids. But new friend, Jack, is disgusted when she witnesses Jamie being cruel to the geeky Boggy. Jamie eventually makes amends, but in the process makes a serious enemy in school bully Dillon. When the horrified Jamie witnesses his mother getting close to a colleague, it makes him all the more determined to track down his dad. Note: First appearances of Mr Hansard, Hugo Bogson, Harry Hansard, Jack Marshall, Dillion Simmonds, Jamie and Karen Reacher, Mike Johnson and Jeremy.
2	2	"Own Goal"	Joe Talbot	Shaun Duggan	15 June 2016
Jamie is determined to find his dad, but with his mum refusing to discuss it with him, where does he even begin? Jamie is about to give up when Boggy comes up with a clever plan using a bit of lateral thinking. Jack is horrified when a distracted and frustrated Jamie messes up his chances of making the school football team, but could Jamie’s bad behaviour present her with a real opportunity? When Jamie is given an unexpected lead he takes drastic measures to hunt down his dad – with devastating consequences.
3	3	"Decider"	Joe Talbot	Sally Rosser	22 June 2016
Reeling from the revelation that his dad has another family, Jamie eventually finds his way home to face the music and is forced to admit to Mike that he stole his money. Jack and Boggy try to help Jamie deal with Hansard, while Jack persuades Jamie that an apology would help and Boggy uses his guile to cement Jamie’s second chance. When the truth comes out about why his dad really left, Jamie lashes out, threatening to ruin everything all over again. But a selfless act on the pitch shows Hansard what Jamie is really made of and out of it comes a prize beyond Jamie’s wildest dreams.

=== Series 2 (2017) ===
In this series, Jeremy is played by William Andrews now and Jack Marshall is now played by Lenna Gunning Williams due to the two previous actors being unable and/or unwilling to return to the programme. Ian Reacher is now played by William Fox in his first actual appearance.

No. overall	No. in series	Title	Directed by	Written by	Original release date
4	1	"Hero to Zero"	Joe Talbot	Shaun Duggan	5 April 2017
Jamie is on a high – the video of him scoring against Tibbs has gone viral and he is the hero of Kingsmount. But all this attention goes to Jamie’s head when he forces the team to let him take a penalty and then misses it when he dares to do a Panenka. To make matters worse, it is Harry that eventually secures Kingsmount the match. After the game, Harry winds him up and Jamie quickly turns it into a fight. Note: First appearances of Ms R Savage and Indira Cave.
5	2	"Anger Management"	Joe Talbot	Shaun Duggan	12 April 2017
Mindful of his warning, Jamie does all he can to keep a lid on his temper. Unfortunately for Jamie, he decides going to the boxing gym instead of staying in school is the way to do it and in the process misses a surprise visit from his football hero, Theo Baines. Hansard is quick to capitalise on Jamie’s misery and subtly picks on him. It is too much for Mike, who loses his temper with Hansard. The two have clearly got history and Jamie is determined to find out what it is.
6	3	"The Scout"	Joe Talbot	Sally Rosser	19 April 2017
When Dillon and Harry discover that it was Mike who ended Hansard’s career with a horror tackle, they do everything they can to wind Jamie up during a cup match. There is a Hawkstone scout at the game – will Jamie be able to keep his hot temper in check, or will Dillon get the nod ahead of him?
7	4	"Trial and Error"	Joe Talbot	Ben Tagoe	26 April 2017
It is Dillon’s first try-out at Hawkstone Academy and Jack is sent along to cover it for the school blog. Jack cannot stand seeing Dillon taking Jamie’s place and sets out to try and persuade the Hawkstone manager to give Jamie a chance. Dillon does well but is bullied by star player Jethro. Meanwhile, Jamie struggles to come to terms with the consequences of his actions and it is only when Mike gives him his beloved Book of Legends that Jamie finds the final piece of advice he needs. Note: First appearance of Jethro.
8	5	"The No-Boggy"	Julian Kemp	Sally Rosser	3 May 2017
It is Sports Personality of the Year time at Kingsmount and captain Dillon is confident of winning. Boggy finally has a date with online buddy, Nancy, and enlists Indira’s help to prepare. The date does not go as planned and Boggy feels humiliated, so his friends step in. The SPOTY trophy is in their sights, but who will eventually triumph? Note: First appearance of Nancy.
9	6	"Watch Me Fly"	Joe Talbot	Diane Whitley	10 May 2017
It is Jamie’s first match back after his ban. He is determined to keep focused, but suddenly he seems to have distractions from all sides – not least the arrival of the son of Hawkstone’s latest international signing. But just as things are going well at home too – with him finally getting on with his mother’s boyfriend, Jeremy – there's a knock at the door. Note: First appearance of Michel and Raymond Beynard.
10	7	"Dad Trouble"	Julian Kemp	Diane Whitley	17 May 2017
Jamie’s dad, Ian, pays a surprise visit and promises to get him a trial at Hawkstone Academy. Jamie is desperate to ask about his other family, but Ian is not opening up. Dillon continues to act strangely and something clearly is not right, but Jack, Boggy and Jamie can't work out what.
11	8	"They Think It's All Over"	Julian Kemp	Shaun Duggan	24 May 2017
Jack is desperate to play in midfield but has to work twice as hard as anyone else to prove her worth to Hansard and is furious when it seems that Hansard is playing an international football’s son, Michel Bernard, ahead of her. Jack vents her frustration at the team, but could this knock to morale cost them the semi-final? And what is Hawkstone Academy bully Jethro doing in the crowd? Note: First appearances of Joanne Simmonds and Mr Marshall.
12	9	"Second Chances"	Julian Kemp	Shaun Duggan	31 May 2017
Reeling from their semi-final defeat, the team are rallied when it seems Boggy might have unearthed some good news. Jack is still not being honest with Jamie about spending time with Michel. When he sees them together at a Hawkstone match, he feels betrayed – but Michel’s days at Kingsmount may be numbered. Jethro threatens Dillon; does he have no choice but to betray his teammates? Note: Last appearances of Michel and Raymond Bernard and Jeremy.
13	10	"End Game"	Joe Talbot	Ben Tagoe	7 June 2017
Kingsmount are through to the cup final at St. George’s Park, the home of the England National Team and the pressure is immense. Jamie is desperate to be scouted. Jethro puts more pressure on Dillon – will he go against his teammates? Will Hansard be forced to finally listen to Jack’s team tactics? And will Jamie finally be able to put his penalty-kick demons to rest? Note: Last appearances of Joanne Simmonds and Harry Hansard.

=== Series 3 (2018) ===
No. overall	No. in series	Title	Directed by	Written by	Original release date
14	1	"Dream Academy"	Joe Talbot	Shaun Duggan	5 April 2018
When Jamie’s trial with Foxborough Academy falls at the same time Kingsmount are due to defend the school cup, he convinces himself he can do both. But when he fails to make it to the Kingsmount game before kick-off, Hansard is forced to change his game plan. Has Jamie’s ego just cost everyone dearly? Note: First appearances of Wozza and Zoe Moore.
15	2	"Get Up 8"	Joe Talbot	Stephen Brady	12 April 2018
With the school football team on hold for a year, Jack decides to keep her football dreams alive by starting her own grassroots team. But with Dillon and Jethro seemingly determined to start World War III, and Hansard refusing to be a coach alongside Mike, Jack finds it harder than she thought.
16	3	"The Scorpion"	Joe Talbot	Stephen Brady	19 April 2018
Boggy decides it is time for him to move on from just being the team mascot and sets out as chief scout for Jack’s new team. First mission: find a new goalie so Jack can play outfield. But when it becomes clear his chosen candidate has behaviour issues, Hansard needs some convincing.
17	4	"Heart Breaker"	Joe Talbot	Diane Whitley	26 April 2018
Dillon has got it all – a place at a top football academy, the clothes, the kudos, the girls – and it is all thanks to his talent with a football. But will he learn that there is more to being an academy player than scoring goals?
18	5	"Stiff Competition"	Joe Talbot	Shaun Duggan	3 May 2018
Phoenix need a kit if they are to be taken seriously on the pitch. But when Jack organises a fundraiser, Zoe will stop at nothing to make sure she is the one to come out on top.
19	6	"The Wrong Path"	Julian Kemp	Shaun Duggan	10 May 2018
Indira is quick to spread gossip about Jamie’s dad, but when Boggy’s investigations throw doubt on Indira’s assumptions, she is left with a surprising dilemma. Has she got what it takes to be a true friend? Note: First appearance of Claire Moore.
20	7	"Going Bad"	Julian Kemp	Diane Whitley	17 May 2018
Things go from bad to worse as Jamie turns his back on his friends to hang out with Jethro. Even Jack gets the cold shoulder as she sets off to play with England’s Lionesses. Could Boggy be right that Jamie’s actions are a deliberate ploy to get himself kicked out of Foxborough? Note: Last regular appearance of Jethro.
21	8	"Out of the Game"	Julian Kemp	Ben Tagoe	24 May 2018
Jamie has had enough of football. But Mike is determined not to give up on him and thinks playing for Phoenix is the key – if only Jamie can be persuaded to play.
22	9	"Judgement Day"	Julian Kemp	Ben Tagoe	31 May 2018
Jack and Zoe go head to head for a place at Archfield Women’s Academy, whilst Jamie helps Boggy get Phoenix’s sponsor back on board. But when the sponsor makes it clear they are only interested if he is in, Jamie makes a promise he might regret. Note: This episode sees Jack Marshall depart but she returns 11 episodes later.
23	10	"End of the Line"	Julian Kemp	Shaun Duggan	7 June 2018
It is time for Jamie to say goodbye to Jack and decide whether he is signing for Premier League Foxborough or staying with grassroots club Phoenix. Jamie knows where his heart lies, but is he ready for either decision? Note: Last appearances of Ms R Savage, Indira Cave and Mr Marshall. Note: Last regular appearance of Mr Hansard.

=== Series 4 (2019) ===
No. overall	No. in series	Title	Directed by	Written by	Original release date
24	1	"Field of Dreams"	Julian Kemp	Shaun Duggan	11 April 2019
New pitch, new coach, new rivals. No Jack. Jamie is haunted by Jack’s absence from his life, but determined to make the best of Phoenix’s new circumstances. But although playing in a real stadium at Goodfield Park, home of non-league club Northport Rovers, sounds really cool, Jamie’s less impressed by the threadbare playing surface and their rundown training pitches. Note: First appearances of Alba, Eric, Freddie Seo, Molly Sinkamba, Duncan and Sienna Jones.
25	2	"Hidden Talents"	Julian Kemp	Shaun Duggan	18 April 2019
Jamie proves himself as captain, but at what cost? He is determined to prove that he has what it takes to lead the Phoenix under-14s to the Gothia Cup. He sets out to impress Molly, but he goes about it in completely the wrong way, despite a trust exercise which Molly makes the team do, in training he once again plays selfishly, which alienates his teammates. Then Wozza turns up late and announces that he is quitting the team. Jamie lays into him. This leads Molly to give Jamie a major dressing down. Being captain is not just about what you do on the pitch, it is everything else off the pitch as well, respecting your teammates and setting an example. Note: Wozza departs in this episode, but he returns 8 episodes later. Note: First appearance of Liam Simmonds.
26	3	"Catch"	Julian Kemp	Diane Whitley	25 April 2019
Boggy leads the search for a new U14 goalkeeper, but neglects girlfriend, Nancy, while Alba helps Mike motivate the rest of the misbehaving U12s. Note: Last appearance of Nancy. Note: First appearance of Ruby.
27	4	"Some You Win"	Julian Kemp	Andrew Burrell	2 May 2019
It's the U14s’ first big match of the season, and captain Jamie is determined to win. But his coach Molly has different priorities, which set them on a collision course.
28	5	"Son and Heir"	Joe Talbot	Shaun Duggan	9 May 2019
Under their father’s influence, Dillon and Liam seek to assert themselves in very different ways. But who will stand up for what's right when push comes to shove? Note: First appearance of Graham Simmonds.
29	6	"A Friend in Need"	Joe Talbot	Mark Illis	16 May 2019
Just as Zoe rises heroically to the challenge she's been set a bombshell from her mother threatens to ruin everything. Will stubborn Zoe allow her friends to help her in time?
30	7	"The Anniversary"	Joe Talbot	Diane Whitley	23 May 2019
Troubled Eric says that he can't play in the U12s’ next game, but won't tell coach Molly why. Can she help him to open up about what's bothering him and get him to play?
31	8	"Matchmaking"	Julian Kemp	Andrew Burrell	30 May 2019
When Jamie’s dad is forced to move back into the family home, Jamie decides to play cupid. But will his plan work? And who is the real Dillon Simmonds?
32	9	"Pressure Point"	Joe Talbot	Diane Whitley	6 June 2019
Only one team can go to Sweden, but will Dillon be able to hold it together as his dad piles on the pressure? Or will it take Jamie’s skills to keep the U14s’ dream alive?
33	10	"The Lost Boys"	Joe Talbot	Andrew Burrell	13 June 2019
Dillon is adamant he is not going to Sweden, but can Jamie persuade him to change his mind? And what will the team make of Duncan’s last-minute addition. Note: Both Wozza and Jack Marshall return in this episode.
34	11	"Phoenix Reunited"	Joe Talbot & Julian Kemp	Shaun Duggan	20 June 2019
Phoenix arrive at the Gothia Cup. After an eventful opening ceremony, they win their first match – but will the tensions simmering below the surface ruin everything?
35	12	"Game of Two Halves"	Joe Talbot	Shaun Duggan	27 June 2019
Jamie realises winning the Gothia Cup isn't going to bring Jack back. Boggy discovers Duncan has secret plans for Jamie’s future – but what are they and what can he do about them?
36	13	"Fair Play"	Joe Talbot & Julian Kemp	Shaun Duggan	27 June 2019
Boggy forces Duncan to come clean as Phoenix play well and make it through to the semi-finals. But when the referee makes a bad decision, Jamie is left with a huge moral dilemma. Note: Last appearances of Sienna Jones and Molly Sinkamba. Note: Last semi-regular appearances of Jack Marshall and Wozza.

==== The Real Gothia Cup (2019) ====
No. overall	No. in series	Title	Directed by	Original release date
S01	S01	"The Real Gothia Cup"	Sam Talbot	29 June 2019
Louis Dunn, Lenna Gunning Williams, Patrick Ward, Maddie Murchinson, Jermaine Johnson and Ellie Botterill tell the true story of their trip to Sweden, where they played for real in the world's biggest youth football tournament, the Gothia Cup.

=== Series 5 (2020) ===
No. overall	No. in series	Title	Directed by	Written by	Original release date
37	1	"Game Changer"	Joe Talbot	Shaun Duggan	7 May 2020
Phoenix FC’s incredible cup run leads to a semi-final clash with Hawkstone Academy. Jamie dreams of being scouted, but will Duncan’s secret come out and change everything?
38	2	"Never Give Up"	Joe Talbot	Jaden Clark	14 May 2020
Jamie and Boggy set out to solve the mystery surrounding Duncan and Hawkstone. Meanwhile, Alba gets serious about Phoenix’s next league match – but what about Eric and Freddie?
39	3	"New Signing"	Joe Talbot	Shaun Duggan	21 May 2020
Jamie is poised to sign for Hawkstone United if he passes his medical and his interview with Howard Royle goes smoothly. What could possibly go wrong?
40	4	"Visiting Hours"	Sam Talbot	Shaun Duggan	28 May 2020
Boggy visits Jamie in hospital and tries to cheer him up after his accident. They reflect on the events that led Jamie to this point, before another old friend comes to visit. Note: Guest appearance of Jack Marshall.
41	5	"Star Player"	Joe Talbot	Jaden Clark	4 June 2020
New arrival Elliot makes waves at Phoenix and leaves Alba fuming. Can she control her temper and lead Phoenix to a much-needed win? Elsewhere, Duncan tries to make amends. Note: First appearance of Elliot.
42	6	"Why Always Me?"	Julian Kemp	Mark Illis	11 June 2020
New girl Kat joins the Phoenix U16s, but tensions soon mount between her and Zoe, while Liam rejoins the U14s, claiming he has changed – but has he really? Note: First appearance of Kat Clayton.
43	7	"Cup Final Shock"	Joe Talbot	Shaun Duggan	18 June 2020
Can Dillon overcome his demons and lead Phoenix to victory in the cup final? Can Zoe and Kat settle their differences and get scouted? Can Boggy find a way to make it up to Jamie?
44	8	"Outside the Box"	Joe Talbot	Shaun Duggan	25 June 2020
Dillon and Elliot meet to discuss what happened after the cup final. Dillon is worried about what will happen if anyone else finds out, especially his dad. Note: Last semi-regular appearance of Elliot.
45	9	"Pixel Player"	Julian Kemp	Joe Williams	2 July 2020
Jamie rises up the rankings as a football gamer and faces off against a mystery opponent. Meanwhile, Freddie’s plans for a fun day out are scuppered when Eric brings along a new friend. Note: First appearance of Aisha.
46	10	"Equaliser"	Julian Kemp	Diane Whitley	9 July 2020
Zoe plans a special all-girls match to show the Hawkstone coach that there are talented female footballers in the area – but can she finally tell Kat the truth?
47	11	"Results Day"	Julian Kemp	Alison Hume	16 July 2020
Alba heaps pressure on Boggy to get his tactics right for the U13s’ crucial relegation decider. Eric and Freddie’s rivalry reaches fever pitch, egged on by Liam.
48	12	"Control Halt and Delete"	Julian Kemp	Joe Williams	23 July 2020
Jamie goes to a football gaming tournament, risking his future with Hawkstone but hoping to unmask his mystery opponent. Meanwhile, can the U13s settle their differences? Note: Jethro guest appears in this episode.
49	13	"Back To Reality"	Julian Kemp	Shaun Duggan	30 July 2020
With the gaming final looming, Jamie faces a huge choice: does he want to be a footballer or a football gamer? And can Dillon reveal his secret to the others? Note: Jethro guest appears in this episode. Note: Last regular appearance of Dillion Simmonds. Note: Last appearances of Ruby, Zoe, Eric, Jethro, Kat Clayton, Graham Simmonds and Karen Johnson.

==== Into E-Sports special (2020) ====
No. overall	No. in series	Title	Directed by	Original release date
S02	S02	"Into E-Sports"	Rupert Langlands Pearse & Sam Talbot	5 October 2020
The cast of the series explore the world of online gaming, meeting some of the world's top virtual football professionals, while Louis Dunn and Patrick Ward play an epic match to settle the ultimate question of who the best virtual football player on the show is.

=== Series 6 (2021) ===
All episode of the series were released in the BBC iPlayer on Monday and each episode was aired on CBBC on Mondays and Tuesdays at 5.00pm.

No. overall	No. series	Title	Directed by	Written by	Original air date
50	1	"Fresh Blood"	Joe Talbot	Jaden Clark	25 October 2021
At Phoenix, a new season begins, and Alba seems dead set on getting a trophy however with the team in disunity and with Liam still having it in for her, it's going to be much harder than she thought. Notes: First appearances of Bex, Finn, Zeph, Nico, Jackson, Billy and Jess Christie.
51	2	"Trials and Tribulation"	Joe Talbot	Julia Kent	26 October 2021
There's a huge assemblage for the trials at Phoenix, as well as a sensational female midfielder and a keeper with a secret. Alba and Liam clash over their preferred candidates. Note: First appearance of Jake Wilson.
52	3	"The Comeback Kid"	Joe Talbot	Matt Sinclair	1 November 2021
As a pivotal cup match approaches, Jake dreams of being the next Jamie Johnson. However, when the opportunity presents itself, will he choose to be a hero or a villain? Note: First appearance of Sam.
53	4	"100% Commitment"	Joe Talbot	Ann Marie Di Mambro	2 November 2021
A surprise new coach arrives, who the players want to impress, shakes things up – but has Alba taken her eye off the ball?
54	5	"Claim to Fame"	Keri Collins	Anne Marie Di Mambro	8 November 2021
When Freddie goes solo, his expedition for online views, exhibits him to the inimical side of the internet. Meanwhile, one of Jake's lies finally catch up with him.
55	6	"Friends in Need"	Joe Talbot	Diane Whitley	9 November 2021
Amid rumours that he is vacating Phoenix, Freddie meets an old friend, but a distressing incident shakes him to his core. Meanwhile, Alba discovers a shocking secret about Jess.
56	7	"The Lion's Den"	Joe Talbot	Shaun Duggan	15 November 2021
Freddie seeks atonement, when he comes back to Phoenix but in their quarter-final with the Seagate Lions, an appalling incident occurs which changes everything.
57	8	"The Right Thing"	Joe Talbot	Shaun Duggan	16 November 2021
The Phoenix players face the hugest adjudication of their season after the shocking incident the day before, knowing it will have big consequences – what will they do?
58	9	"Nemisis"	Keri Collins	Julia Kent	22 November 2021
The players look to the future, when Duncan gives exciting news but when his position seems threatened, Liam resorts to desperate measures – how will Alba react?
59	10	"Sucker Punch"	Keri Collins	Jaden Clark	23 November 2021
Liam threatens to reveal what she had done as Alba tries to live with the consequences of her actions. Meanwhile, Mike gets some devastating news.
60	11	"Secrets and Lies"	Keri Collins	Shaun Duggan	29 November 2021
Freddie and Alba are tenacious to make the anti-racism fundraiser a success, but gate crashers threaten to ruin everything. Note: Guest appearances of Dillion Simmonds, Jack Marshall, Walter Worthington and Elliot. Note: Last appearances of Dillion Simmonds, Jack Marshall, Walter Worthington and Aisha.
61	12	"Danger Zone"	Keri Collins	Shaun Duggan	30 November 2021
Liam's first day of training with the Seagate Lions creates some surprises. The Phoenix players plot their revenge, but it all comes down to Freddie. Note: Guest appearance of Elliot. Note: Last appearance of Elliot.
62	13	"Revelation"	Keri Collins	Shaun Duggan	6 December 2021
Phoenix play the Seagate Lions in the ultimate grudge match precipitating shockwaves both on and off the pitch.

=== Series 7 (2022) ===
Each episode was released every Wednesday and Thursday at 6:00pm on the CBBC channel and also released on BBC iPlayer after the original airings on the CBBC channel.

No. Overall	No. In series	Title	Directed by	Written by	Original airdate
63	1	''Half-brothers''	Joe Talbot	Shaun Duggan	12 October 2022
Both Jamie and Jake are stunned at the sudden revelation that they are paternal half-brothers. Can they learn to put aside their differences aside? Or will they end up more divided than ever? Note: First appearance of Karim.
64	2	"Point to Prove"	Joe Talbot	Shaun Duggan	13 October 2022
Jake uses his family connection to Jamie to pressure him into letting him play upfront for the U13s. The arrival of new players onto the team causes tension both on and off the pitch. Note: First appearances of Maddy Kingston and Mukki Hamid.
65	3	"Siege"	Sion Thomas	Peter Kalu & Diane Whitley	19 October 2022
Chaos befalls in Goodfield Park when Jake tries to lead a protest in support for one of his teammates however is he really trying to help his friend or is this all a cover up to deal with his frustration with Jamie.
66	4	"Thicker than water''	Sion Thomas	Ceila Morgan	20 October 2022
Duncan's decision leads to a squabble between the U13s and U15s. Alba tries to settle things by doing it the only she knows how – by challenging the U13s to a match. Whilst a mysterious stranger appearing seems to get Karim worried. Note: First appearance of Uzma.
67	5	"Park the bus"	Sion Thomas	Julia Kent	26 October 2022
Phoenix are finally heading off to Sweden! Dealing with late players, dodgy minibuses and travel havoc, can Jamie keep it all under control and save the day?
68	6	"Eye-opener"	Sion Thomas	Sheila Hyde & Julia Kent	27 October 2022
As the arrival of the Futrball cup comes, an unexpected new star emerges from the shadows at Phoenix FC, while Ian begs to Jake to give him a second chance.
69	7	"Go Together"	Joe Talbot	Matt Sinclair	2 November 2022
The Futrball Cup has finally arrived but with important players losing their focus, the Phoenix U15s and U13s both face tough opposition in their starting matches – how will they get on?
70	8	"The Hangover"	Joe Talbot	Shaun Duggan	3 November 2022
The U15s struggle to come back from the night before as a Hawkstone match dawns. It is also Uzma's first ever game as a referee – but can she trust her own judgement as the pressure begins to mount?
71	9	"In or Out''	Joe Talbot	Diane Whitley	9 November 2022
Sam doesn't know what to do as Maddy's reign of terror upon her continues, will her teammates finally notice before it's too late? Meanwhile, Jake has to deal with his own problems as he faces an important decision. Note: Last appearance of Maddy Kingston.
72	10	"Dirty Laundry"	Joe Talbot	Shaun Duggan	10 November 2022
The U13s truly realise how hard Mukki's journey has been when he finally opens up to them. Alba's dying to tell Liam the truth about Bex, while Jamie is agitated at being stuck at the sidelines.
73	11	"Priorities"	Joe Talbot	Jaden Clark	16 November 2022
Mukki has to deal with a choice that could decide his whole future – but will the rest of the U13s understand? Jamie realises just how badly he has let both not only his team but himself down as well.
74	12	''Chance of a Lifetime''	Joe Talbot	Shaun Duggan	17 November 2022
Jamie gets a chance to bring his career back on track, but a family crisis threatens to ruin everything. Can Liam put Bex's betrayal behind him to focus on the U15s reaching the cup final? Note: Guest appearance of Mr Hilary Hansard. Note: Last appearance of Mr Hilary Hansard.
75	13	"Leap of Faith"	Joe Talbot	Shaun Duggan	17 November 2022
It's the finale of the Futrball cup, the hugest game Phoenix FC have ever played – can Alba, Freddie and the team make history?

== Gothia Cup ==
For the fourth series, the team competed in the Gothia Cup, an international youth football tournament, which has featured several footballers, including Alan Shearer, Andrea Pirlo and Zlatan Ibrahimovic. Matches filmed for the show were mostly real contests, with the actors from the show competing in the tournament. Phoenix FC won six matches in four days, scored 25 goals, conceded just seven, and reached the quarter-finals out of 195 teams, with a squad of just twelve. The team arrived in Sweden having never played a competitive game before and having never previously met some of the cast.

Phoenix FC's run at the tournament was documented in the series four episode The Real Gothia Cup, with Louis Dunn, Lenna Gunning Williams, Patrick Ward, Maddie Murchinson, Jermaine Johnson and Ellie Botterill sharing their memories of the fairytale run.

== Production ==
Cast members were hired for places on the team from both acting and local schools. Many episodes of the series feature cameos from current and former professional footballers specifically for the show, due to the series being produced by the BBC. Since series four, the production has taken place in Wales.

=== Conception ===
The plot is loosely based on the series of books by Dan Freedman about a schoolboy footballer experiencing family issues and playing for the school team. In 2011, the book Born to Play was published as a prequel to the series, establishing the title character, Jamie Johnson, and his estranged parents.
