= International Emmy Award for Best Children & Young People =

Television award category

- Awarded for: Best Children & Young People
- Country: United States
- Presented by: International Academy of Television Arts and Sciences
- First award: 1983
- Final award: 2011
- Currently held by: What Is Your Dream? Chile (2011)
- Website: www.iemmys.tv

The International Emmy Award for Best Children & Young People was presented by the International Academy of Television Arts & Sciences (IATAS) to the best programs intended for children and young people, produced and aired initially outside the United States. The award was presented from 1983 to 2011. In 2012, six categories were created especifically for children's programming. These categories were presented at the International Emmy Kids Awards, a separate ceremony from the main International Emmys.

== Rules and regulations ==
According to rules of the International Academy, the category recognized "any program, in any format (i.e. animation, live-action, etc.) intended specifically for young audiences, this may include drama, local culture, history, music, etc".

== Winners and nominees ==
=== 1980s ===
Year	English title	Original title	Production company/Network	Country
1983	Fraggle Rock		Canadian Broadcasting Corporation	Canada
1984	The Wind in the Willows		Thames Television	United Kingdom
1985	Super Gran		ITV Tyne Tees	United Kingdom
1986	The Kids of Degrassi Street		Canadian Broadcasting Corporation	Canada
1987	Degrassi High		Canadian Broadcasting Corporation	Canada
1988	Captain Johnno		Australian Children's Television Foundation	Australia
1989	My Secret Identity		CTV Television Network	Canada

=== 1990s ===
Year	English title	Original title	Production company/Network	Country
1990	Living With Dinosaurs		Channel 4	United Kingdom
1991	The Fool of the World and the Flying Ship		Cosgrove Hall Productions / Thames Television	United Kingdom
1991	Johnson and Friends		Australian Broadcasting Company	Australia
1991	Boy Soldiers		Australian Children's Television Foundation	Australia
1992	Beat That: Hairdressing		Channel 4	United Kingdom
1992	Sorrow: The Nazi Legacy		Lidingo Filmpoint Sweden	Sweden
1992	Alligator Pie		Canadian Broadcasting Corporation	Canada
1993	The Penknife	Het Zakmes	AVRO / Bos Bros. Film-TV Productions	Netherlands
1993	Round the Twist		Australian Children's Television Foundation	Australia
1993	The Borrowers		BBC Two	United Kingdom
1994	Insektors		Canal+ / France 3	France
1995	Wise Up		Channel 4	United Kingdom
1995	Confissões de Adolescente		TV Cultura	Brazil
1995	Little Lord Fauntleroy		BBC	United Kingdom
1996	Newsround Extra: "War Child"		BBC	United Kingdom
1997	Wise Up		Channel 4	United Kingdom
1998	Blabbermouth & Stickybeak		Channel 4	Australia
1998	Kids Can Do It!		NHK	Japan
1998	Wise Up		Carlton Productions	United Kingdom
1999	Tell Us About Your Life: Battlefield Doctor		NHK	Japan

=== 2000s ===
Year	English title	Original title	Production company/Network	Country
2000	The Magician's House		BBC One	United Kingdom
2000	Street Cents		CBS Television	Canada
2000	De Daltons		VPRO	Netherlands
2001	Street Cents		CBS Television	Canada
2001	Star Golden Bell	스타골든벨	KBS	Korea
2001	William Wever		NCRV	Netherlands
2001	Küss Mich		ZDF	Germany
2002	Stig of the Dump		CBBC / Childsplay Television	United Kingdom
2002	Being Eve		TV3 / South Pacific Pictures	New Zealand
2002	Trickboxx		ARD / ZDF	Germany
2002	Harold Pebble		France 3	France
2003	Legend of the Lost Tribe		BBC One	United Kingdom
2003	The Little Polar Bear	Lars de kleine ijsbeer	Westdeutscher Rundfunk	Germany
2003	An Angel for May		Portman Film / Guerilla Films / Allumination FilmWorks	United Kingdom
2003	It Burns!	Det brinner!	Sveriges Television	Sweden
2004	The Illustrated Mum		Channel 4	United Kingdom
2004	Dunya and Desi	Dunya en Desie	NPS	Netherlands
2004	Colombia		KRO	Netherlands
2004	31 Minutos		Televisión Nacional de Chile	Chile
2005	Dark Oracle		YTV	Canada
2005	Dunya and Desi	Dunya en Desie	NPS	Netherlands
2005	My Life as a Popat		ITV	United Kingdom
2005	Zoé Kézako		TF1	France
2006	Sugar Rush		Channel 4 / Shine TV	United Kingdom
2006	Elias: The Little Rescue Boat	Den lille redningsskøyta Elias	NRK	Norway
2006	Boys Will Be Boys	Gutta Boys	NRK	Norway
2006	Johnny and the Bomb		BBC	United Kingdom
2007	The Magic Tree	Magiczne drzewo	Telewizja Polska	Poland
2007	The Arena		Mediacorp Channel 5	Singapore
2007	Mortified		Australian Children's Television Foundation	Australia
2007	Um Menino Muito Maluquinho		TVE Brasil	Brazil
2008	Shaun the Sheep		CBBC	United Kingdom
2008	I Feel the Words		NHK	Japan
2008	Patito Feo		El Trece	Argentina
2008	Ping-Pong		NRK / SVT / DR / Yle / KRO	Norway
2009	Dustbin Baby		BBC One / Kindle Entertainment	United Kingdom
2009	Lharn Poo Koo E-Joo	หลานปู่ กู้อีจู้	Channel 7	Thailand
2009	The Little Emperor's Christmas	O Natal do Menino Imperador	Rede Globo	Brazil
2009	Mille		DR	Denmark

=== 2010s ===
Year	English title	Original title	Production company/Network	Country
2010	Shaun the Sheep		Aardman Animations / BBC One / WDR	United Kingdom
2010	13 at War		NPS Broadcasting Organisation	Netherlands
2010	Do-Re-Mi-Factory		TV Globo	Brazil
2010	Happy Birthday		Fuji Television	Japan
2011	What Is Your Dream?	¿Con qué sueñas?	CNTV / TVN	Chile
2011	Dance Academy		ACTF / ZDF	Australia
2011	Alone Against Time	Allein gegen die Zeit	KiKa	Germany
2011	Saladin		Jeem TV / MDEC	Malaysia
