= Oddbods =

Singaporean-British television series

- Also known as: The Oddbods Show
- Genre: Comedy; Slapstick
- Created by: Richard Thomas
- Directed by: Simon Pike; Aidan McAteer; Christian Cheshire; Richard Thomas; Ehud Landsberg; Jose Guzman; Gilad Bahr; Ruth Ducker; Samantha Suyi Lee
- Creative director: Richard Thomas
- Voices of: Marlon Dance-Hooi; Chio Su Ping; Jeremy Linn; Nadia Ramlee; Lucy Capri
- Theme music composer: Kristin Øhrn Dyrud
- Opening theme: "Oddbods Theme"
- Composer: Kristin Øhrn Dyrud
- Countries of origin: Singapore; United Kingdom
- Original language: None
- No. of seasons: 4
- No. of episodes: 208 (+ 8 specials) (list of episodes)

Production
- Executive producers: Sashim Parmanand; Michele Schofield
- Producers: John Mckenna; Carlene Tan; Steven Read
- Running time: 7 minutes (seasons 1–3); 4 minutes (season 4); 22 minutes (specials)
- Production company: One Animation

Original release
- Network: Disney Channel (Asia); CITV and Boomerang (United Kingdom); Netflix (season 3); YouTube (season 4 and specials)
- Release: 21 January 2013 – 22 December 2024

Oddbods (also known as The Oddbods Show) (Note: Some other countries are using original titles Oddbods and translate the series.) is a Singaporean-British computer-animated comedy web series produced by One Animation. The series centers on eight characters—Bubbles, Pogo, Newt, Jeff, Slick, Fuse, Zee and as of season 4, Lulu—wearing furry suits of different colors. The characters make sounds but there is no dialogue, making the series easily translatable and international. The characters also do not speak English or any human languages coherently, and the characters only speak gibberish.

The series debuted in 2013. Each season has 60 episodes, and the first season ended in 2015. Season two followed in 2016, season three was released on 4 April 2022 on Netflix, and season four was released from 14 October 2023 to 22 December 2024. Each episode is relatively short, and various formats have been broadcast, including one, five, and seven-minute episodes.

The series has won several awards since its debut, including the Asian Television Awards, Apollo Awards, Gold Panda Awards, and Web TV Asia Awards. In 2017, it was nominated for an international Kids Emmy Award.

== Plot ==
The series focuses on eight creatures in colorful furry suits called the Oddbods: Fuse, Pogo, Newt, Bubbles, Slick, Jeff, Zee, and Lulu.

The storyline of each episode depicts how these characters "survive the perils of everyday life, unintentionally turning ordinary situations into unexpected, extraordinary and always humorous events." Episodes typically employ physical comedy and pranks played out between the characters, and the events that follow.

The series was conceived as a non-dialogue comedy, which the series' creators and writers say, "captures the madcap yet charming antics of the Oddbods, who celebrate success where they find it and take failure in their stride. To turn 'different' into a positive; celebrating individuality in a humorous, warm and unexpected way."

The series' strapline is "Embrace your inner odd, there's a little odd in everyone!"

== Characters ==
=== Main ===
- Fuse (voiced by Marlon Dance-Hooi): is a red Oddbod. He's the hot-headed leader of the Oddbods. He can instantly change from serene to enraged, which makes his friends avoid him whenever he is in a bad mood, but admire his "heart of gold". He is always willing to play sports, but only if he wins.
- Pogo (voiced by Marlon Dance-Hooi): is a blue Oddbod. He does not follow common etiquette as he is dubbed the "ultimate prankster". His friends like his practical jokes if they are not aimed at them. He owns an ice cream truck.
- Newt (voiced by Nadia Ramlee): is a pink Oddbod. She is addicted to candy and her friends are inspired by her pleasant interaction with others, although she can be arrogant. She is inquisitive, always hangs out with her friends, and enjoys taking selfies with them. She loves nature.
- Bubbles (voiced by Chio Su Ping): is a yellow Oddbod. She performs scientific experiments with an obsession of discovering or inventing interesting objects, such as futuristic devices and UFOs. Her friends like her for her personality, although they do not like being excluded from her personal experiments.
- Slick (voiced by Chio Su Ping & Jeremy Linn): is an orange Oddbod. He believes in YOLO, but suffers from FOMO. He likes to dance, and tries to act as the cool person in the group. He is often seen trying to flirt with Newt.
- Jeff (voiced by Jeremy Linn): is a purple Oddbod. He has obsessive compulsive disorder and is a germaphobe. As a result, he can spot extremely tiny dust particles, and is very tidy. He is very talented in art and likes classical music and his friends like him for his admiration of detail. However, he wishes that he can act in a more relaxed manner.
- Zee (voiced by Jeremy Linn): is a green Oddbod. He always takes naps, even while eating junk food. He never cleans his house. His laid-back attitude serves as both a strength and weakness when it comes to his friendships with the others.
- Lulu (voiced by Lucy Capri): is a cyan new Oddbod from Minibods. She first appeared in "Lulu's Hero". She is the shortest Oddbod; and likes music. She and Newt typically have a sisterly relationship.

=== Recurring ===
Characters who have recurred across different stories although some appeared only in one episode:

- BG Oddbods (voiced by all actors): are grey Oddbods, they have no features on the costume. They all look the same and act, by and large, like typical citizens. Some BG Oddbods have accessories, like moustaches and hats.
- Yin and Yang (voiced by Marlon Dance-Hooi): They are black and white oddbods and are known as the Odd Ninjas. These Ninjas are actually actors of a TV show, not members of the Oddbods.
- Modo (voiced by Marlon Dance-Hooi): is a light blue Oddbod. He only appears in "One Two Many". He is a cloned version of Pogo. Modo is a very mischievous character (much like Pogo himself), but even more so than Pogo.
- Oddroid: Oddroid would do anything with anybody but mostly being Slick who bought him and acts like a friend to all but he gets struck by lightning, and since then, wants to destroy everything and anyone who annoys him and appears to be always in a bad mood.
- Genie (voiced by Jeremy Linn): an Oddbod genie. He only appears in the episode "Pogo and the Lamp". The Genie seems grumpy and doesn't care that much. He is willing to offer wishes (like a usual Genie) but does not like being waken up constantly.
- Robo Helper (voiced by Chio Su Ping and Jeremy Linn): It only appears in "Robo Helper". The Robo Helper is a robot that was invented by Bubbles.

=== Guest ===
Characters who had only appeared in special episodes.

- Marv (voiced by Jeremy Linn): a gray Oddbod. Marv is a magician who had turned most of the Oddbods (except Slick) into monsters because they laughed at him. And so it's up to Slick to bring back the magician and undo the magic spell and bring back the Oddbods to life again. He has only appeared in "Party Monsters".
- Santa Claus (voiced by Marlon Dance-Hooi and Marc Thompson) : a red Oddbod. He appears in the Christmas-themed episodes, "The Festive Menace", "Festive Encounters" & "Santa Swap".
- Oddbeard: A gray Oddbod. He appears only in "Oddbeard's Curse". He is a pirate captain with a golden tooth who died after the battle with some sailors.

== Production ==
=== Development ===
Speaking in an interview with the Manchester Evening News in 2016, Richard Thomas, the creator of the Oddbods and creative director at One Animation described how he first devised the show:

It was the themes of friendship & personality that inspired the creation of Oddbods. I wanted them to have an aesthetic appeal, but underneath the simplistic design I wanted them to have 'relatable' depth of character; individuals with a heart and core personality that the viewer could relate to. The non-dialogue approach was very deliberate - it was important that the animation conveyed the emotion. Every nuance counts, the eye dart, the raised eyebrow, the posture...it's the subtleties that bring the characters to life. The production process is intense but finely honed and we work with a huge and complex team of global animation professionals to bring the show to life; from animators, to script-writers to design and lighting experts to the directors who shape all of the action. At a time when powerful forces seek to divide us because of our differences, the Oddbods are a small voice in opposition celebrating those differences and the joy and richness they can bring to our everyday lives.

=== One Animation ===
Founded in 2008, One Animation Pte Ltd was a Singaporean CGI animation studio based in the Alexandra subzone of the Bukit Merah district. The company had also produced Rob the Robot, Insectibles and cancelled series Hard Boiled and Abigail's Tales. The company had produced a portfolio of successful animated series that are broadcast on global networks such as Disney Channel, Cartoon Network, Nickelodeon, Disney XD, Discovery Kids, ABC, and seen across more than 100 countries worldwide.

The company focused on developing family-focused TV, film and new media content, facilitating shorter than average production schedules, utilizing a crew that was typically one-third the size of a traditional CGI animation production team.

In May 2022, One Animation was acquired by Candle Media company Moonbug Entertainment. Nearly 2 years later, in February 2024, Moonbug officially shut down One Animation.

=== Soundtrack ===
The soundtrack is composed by Kristin Øhrn Dyrud.

== Other media ==
=== Minibods ===
A spin-off of Oddbods that features five out of the seven main Oddbods characters as toddlers with the addition of new character, Lulu. It premiered on 15 April 2023 on the series' YouTube channel with 39 episodes produced.

== Episodes ==
| Season | Episodes | Originally released | |
| Season | Episodes | First released | Last released |
|---|---|---|---|
| 1 | 60 | 21 January 2013 | 2015 |
| 2 | 60 | 2016 | TBA |
| Specials | 8 | 1 October 2018 | 5 April 2023 |
| 3 | 60 | 4 April 2022 | |
| 4 | 28 | 14 October 2023 | 22 December 2024 |

== Broadcast and release ==
The series has been broadcast on 25 networks in 105 countries worldwide on free-to-air, as well as subscription channels, such as Boomerang, Disney Channel, Télétoon+ (France), ITV (UK), Pogo (India), Cartoonito (Italy), RCTI, ANTV, RTV (coming soon) Spacetoon (Now) (Indonesia), Kapamilya Channel (Philippines), ETTV Yoyo (Taiwan) and Cartoon Network. It is also available on-demand on social media channels, most notably YouTube, iQIYI (China) and ABC Me (Australia), where it has gained over one billion views in just one year. There are currently approximately 11.9 Million subscribers to the series' YouTube channel (As of 14 November 2026). In 2015, the series aired on Disney XD in the United States and last aired in 2015. In 2016 Japan, the series aired on Disney XD with adaptation of The Oddbods Show, only showing in season 1, but it stopped airing and removed the show. The series came on ITVBe's LittleBe on 3 September 2018. Also, the series came to Disney XD in 2020, but stopped airing and streamed episodes on DisneyNOW, which also stopped streaming episodes. In 2017, Netflix added seasons 1 and 2 into their streaming service only other countries available in season 2, such as Singapore, Philippines, Japan and South Korea, the streaming removed season 2 and only showing season 1 in 2021.

== Reception ==
=== Ratings ===
In 2015, Oddbods was one of the highest-rated children's television shows in the United Kingdom, by number of viewers. It was one of CiTV's top five shows for the first quarter of 2016.

=== Awards ===
- 2014: Best 3D animation at Television Asia Plus
- 2014: Asia Image Apollo Awards
- 2014: Apollo Awards: 3D Animation
- 2015: Sichuan TV Festival 'God Panda' Award: best animated character
- 2016: Web TV Asia Awards
- 2017: International Emmy Kids Awards (Nominee)
- 2019: International Emmy Kids Awards (Nominee)
- 2020: International Emmy Kids Awards (Nominee)

== Interactive ==
In January 2017, One Animation launched a new look website dedicated to the Oddbods as a place where fans of the show (adults and children alike) can interact with the brand.

The site hosts seven games with player leaderboards. Other features include videos, user generated content, in store section, shop now section, interactive background pages on each of the characters complete with trading card-style character summary and related videos. There is also an interactive collector poster which allows fans to view the episode their collectible figurine was inspired by.

== Licensing ==
In 2016, One Animation announced via press releases various partnerships with key licensing partners for Oddbods around the world including, amongst others, with ITV Studios Global Entertainment (ITVS GE) and Copyright Promotions and Licensing Group (CPLG).

This led to the commencement of a global licensing programme being rolled out, the first of which was a range of toys made available first in Europe and the Middle East. As well as extending the toy availability around the world over the course of 2017/18, a wider range of consumer products including apparel, giftware and stationery are also in the pipeline.
