= MIPCOM =

Annual trade show organized by Reed MIDEM

MIPCOM Marché International des Programmes de Communication

- View of the 2016 conference
- Status: Active
- Genre: Trade show
- Frequency: Annually
- Locations: Palais des Festivals, Cannes
- Country: France
- Years active: 1985–present
- Participants: 13,700 (2015)
- Major events: Buy, sell and view television formats
- Organiser: RX Global
- Website: www.mipcom.com

MIPCOM (Marché International des Programmes de Communication, English: International Market of Communications Programmes) is an annual trade show for the television industry held in Cannes, France, traditionally in the month of October and running for 4 days. It is owned and organized by Reed MIDEM, a subsidiary of Reed Exhibitions.

== Format ==
The event is primarily attended by representatives of television studios and broadcasters, who use the event as a marketplace to buy and sell new programmes and formats for international distribution, as well as celebrities to promote programming.

The event also features keynote presentations and panels featuring representatives of the industry discussing new trends and developments. Additionally, MIPCOM has been used to globally premiere highly anticipated new programs.

Prior to MIPCOM, a spin-off event known as MIPJunior is held, which is devoted exclusively to the children's television industry.

MIPCOM also has a sister event, MIPTV Media Market, which is a similar format also in Cannes by the same organizers, in the opposite half of the year (usually April). MIPCOM is slightly better attended than MIPTV. MIPTV is moving to London.

== History ==
Publicity event for The Walking Dead, MIPCOM 2010

In 2020 the event moved online due to travel restrictions related to the COVID-19 pandemic.

From 2026, MIPCOM expanded its programme to include vertical content, notably the Duanju format, through the Microdrama & Vertical Content Programme, featuring dedicated conferences, networking events and industry sessions.

== See also ==
- MIPTV, sister event
