= International Emmy Award for Best Documentary =

Television award for non-US documentaries

- Awarded for: Best Documentary
- Country: United States
- Presented by: International Academy of Television Arts and Sciences
- First award: 1967
- Currently held by: Hell Jumper; United Kingdom (2025)
- Website: www.iemmys.tv

The International Emmy Award for Best Documentary has been presented since 1967 by the International Academy of Television Arts & Sciences (IATAS) to the best documentaries produced and initially aired outside the United States.

== Rules ==
According to the rules of the International Academy, a documentary is a factual presentation that provides an in-depth analysis of a specific subject or point of view, supported by evidence and informed commentary, on any subject other than art and artists. The program must meet the minimum format length of a televised half-hour time slot.

If the program is part of a continuous series of self-contained episodes (i.e., each episode has its own storyline with a conclusion; or each episode may have a different director and/or producer; or the series has the potential to continue for multiple seasons), then each episode must be submitted as a separate entry.

If the program is a multi-part series with a finite number of episodes (no further episodes planned), covering the same theme, two (2) episodes must be submitted to represent the series as a whole.

If the program contains multiple parts with a continuing storyline beyond one episode or shares the same concept, two (2) episodes must be submitted to represent the series as a whole. The program may employ partial reenactment, stock footage, stills, animation, stop-motion, or other techniques, as long as the emphasis is on fact and not fiction.

== Winners and nominees ==
=== 1960s-1970s ===
Year	English title	Original title	Production company/Network	Country
1967	Big Deal at Gothenburg		Tyne Tees Television	United Kingdom
1968	The Anderson Platoon	La Section Anderson	Radiodiffusion-Télévision Française	France
1969	The Last Campaign of Robert Kennedy		Swiss Broadcasting and Television	Switzerland
1979	The Secret Hospital – Part 1, Rampton		Yorkshire Television	United Kingdom

=== 1980s ===
Year	English title	Original title	Production company/Network	Country
1980	Fighting Back		Canadian Broadcasting Corporation	Canada
1981	Charters to Hell	Charters Pour L'Enfer	TF1	France
1982	Is There One Who Understands Me? – The World of James Joyce		Raidió Teilifís Éireann	Ireland
1983	The Miracle of Life		Swedish Television	Sweden
1984	The Heart of the Dragon: Remembering (Episode 1)		Channel 4	United Kingdom
1985	28 Up		Granada Television	United Kingdom
1986	Chasing a Rainbow: The Life of Josephine Baker		Channel 4 / Csaky Ltd.	United Kingdom
1987	The Sword of Islam		Granada Television	United Kingdom
1988	The Last Seven Months of Anne Frank		TROS / BRT Belgium Television / AVA	United Kingdom
1989	Four Hours in My Lai		Yorkshire TV	United Kingdom

=== 1990s ===
Year	English title	Original title	Production company/Network	Country
1990	J'ai Douze Ans et Je Fais la Guerre		CAPA Production / Canal Plus / France 3	France
1991	Cambodia – The Betrayal		ITV Central	United Kingdom
1991	El Caso 112		Televisión Española	Spain
1991	Chasseurs des ténèbres		Antenne 2 / MDI / Nat Geo / Wind Horse	France
1992	The Fifth Estate: To Sell A War		Canadian Broadcasting Corporation	Canada
1992	Inside Story: The Nightrider		BBC Television	United Kingdom
1992	Kwai		Antenne 2	France
1993	Disappearing World: "We Are All Neighbours"		Granada Television	United Kingdom
1993	Monika and Jonas – The Face of the Informer State		NHK	Japan
1993	Shackled Children		Metropole Television	France
1994	Life in the Freezer: "The Big Freeze"		BBC	United Kingdom
1995	Anne Frank Remembered		Jon Blair Film Company / BBC / Disney Channel	United Kingdom
1995	Lest We Forget	Contre L’Oubli	France 2	France
1995	The Dead (Twenty-Five Bloody Years)		BBC	United Kingdom
1995	Igor – Child of Chernobyl		Zenith North / Carlton Television	United Kingdom
1996	The Pelican of Ramzan the Red		Boreales / Canal + / Docstar / Premiere	France
1996	People's Century: "1933: The Master Race"		BBC Television / WGBH	United Kingdom
1996	The Saga of Life: The Unknown World		Sveriges Television / Eriksson Television / Wanngard	Sweden
1997	Gerrie & Louise		Canadian Broadcasting Corporation	Canada
1998	Exile in Sarajevo		Exile Productions	Australia
1998	Futebol		GNT / Globosat / Videofilmes	Brazil
1998	Endgame: The Untold Story of the Hostage Crisis in Peru		NHK	Japan
1999	Born in the USSR: 14 Up		Granada Television / BBC	United Kingdom
1999	Just Like Anyone Else		Mainichi Broadcasting System	Japan

=== 2000s ===
Year	English title	Original title	Production company/Network	Country
2000	Kapo		RAI 3 / Spiegel TV / TEL-AD TV	Israel
2000	Stolen Generations		Jotz Productions	Australia
2000	Playing the China Card: Nixon and Mao		Channel 4 / WGBH-TV	United Kingdom
2001	Welcome to North Korea		KRO Television	Netherlands
2001	Challenger: Go for Launch		BBC Two	United Kingdom
2001	Golda's List	La liste Golda	France 3	France
2001	For My Baby		Mainichi	Japan
2002	Nicholas Winton - The Power of Good		WIP / Czech Television / Slovak Television	Slovakia
2002	Offspring		Barna-Alper Productions / CBC Television	Canada
2002	Decision at Age 18 - Israeli Youths Refuse To Fight		NHK	Japan
2002	City Slickers: A Tale of Two African Penguins		Pelican Pictures	South Africa
2003	Like Goes On	Das Leben geht weiter	StarCrest Media GmbH	Germany
2003	Avenging Terror		Channel 4	United Kingdom
2003	The Last Peasants		Channel 4	United Kingdom
2003	Stalingrad		ZDF	Germany
2004	The Boy Whose Skin Fell Off		Channel 4	United Kingdom
2004	Testigo		Canal 13	Chile
2004	Seven Wonders of the Industrial World: "Hoover Dam"		BBC Two	United Kingdom
2004	The Origins of AIDS	Les Origines du Sida	Galafilm / MFP / Pathe Archives	Canada, France
2005	The Drama of Dresden		BROADVIEW TV GmbH / ZDF	Germany
2005	Contacto: "Paul Schafer: Se Busca"		Canal 13	Chile
2005	The House of Saud		Arte France / Alegria / Starling / BBC / WGBH Boston	France, United Kingdom
2005	Prostitution Behind the Veil	Prostitution bakom slojan	COSMO DOC APS / SVT	Denmark, Sweden
2006	Hiroshima		BBC / TF1 / ZDF / Discovery Channel	United Kingdom
2006	How Putin Came To Power		Arte	France
2006	9/11: The Falling Man		Channel 4	United Kingdom
2006	The Search for Happiness		WRD	Germany
2007	Stephen Fry: The Secret Life of the Manic Depressive		IWC Media / BBC Scotland	United Kingdom
2007	In God's Hands		RCN Televisión	Colombia
2007	Dinosaurs vs. Mammals – Secrets of Mammalian Survival		NHK	Japan
2007	Smiling in a War Zone		Cosmo Doc / ZDF / SVT	Denmark
2008	The Beckoning Silence		Channel 4	United Kingdom
2008	Asian Corridor in Heaven (Tea-Horse Old Road)		KBS	South Korea
2008	Collision over the Amazon	Colisão sobre a Amazônia	Discovery Channel / US Hispanic	Brazil
2008	Please Vote for Me		Steps International	Denmark
2009	The Ascent of Money		Chimerica Media Limited / Channel 4	United Kingdom
2009	Pancho Villa: Aqui y Alli		History Channel Latin America / Anima Films	Argentina
2009	Shooting the Messenger		Al Jazeera English	Qatar
2009	Cityboy – The Life of Investment Banker Geraint Anderson		United Docs / ECO Media / WDR	Germany

=== 2010s ===
Year	English title	Original title	Production company/Network	Country
2010	Mom and the Red Bean Cake		Munhwa Broadcasting Corporation	South Korea
2010	9/11: Phone Calls from the Towers		Channel 4	United Kingdom
2010	Kuarup: The Lost Soul Will Return	Kuarup: A alma perdida vai voltar	TV Globo	Brazil
2010	You Die as You Lived: Roterdam Hospice	Je gaat dood zoals je geleefd hebt	KRO Broadcasting Company	Netherlands
2011	Life with Murder		JS Kastner Productions / National Film Board of Canada	Canada
2011	Confesiones de un Sicario		Turner Argentina / Anima Films	Argentina
2011	The Nonfiction: Family Meeting - 7 Years in the Tanaka Family		Fuji TV	Japan
2011	Wild Japan		GmbH / ORF / ARTE / National Geographic / Parthenon Entertainment	Germany
2012	Terry Pratchett: Choosing to Die		BBC / KEO Films	United Kingdom
2012	Across Land, Across Sea		The Chosun Ilbo	South Korea
2012	Hitler's Scape	El escape de Hitler	History Channel Latin America / Anima Films	Argentina
2012	Race to the South Pole	Der Wettlauf zum Südpol	Loopfilm GmbH / ZDF	Germany
2013	5 Broken Cameras		Alegria Productions / Guy DVD Films / Burnat Films Palestine / France Télévisions	France
2013	The Golden Hour		Desert Road / TVNZ	New Zealand
2013	My Mother, Lady Bondong		MBC	South Korea
2013	5 de Mayo, Un Dia de Gloria		Discovery Channel Latin America / Cactus Films	Mexico
2014	No Burqas Behind Bars	Frihet bakom galler	Nima Film / SVT / NHK / Ikon / DRTV / NRK	Sweden
2014	Going Back	De Volta	Canal Futura / COOPAS	Brazil
2014	No Fire Zone: The Killing Fields of Sri Lanka		Outsider Films / Channel 4	United Kingdom
2014	Phantoms of the Border		TV Chosun	South Korea
2015	Miners Shot Down		Uhuru Productions	South Africa
2015	Africa's Wild West - Stallions of the Namib Desert		Interspot Film / ORF / ARTE / NDR	Austria
2015	Before We Are Forgotten	Antes de que Nos Olviden	HBO Latin America	Mexico
2015	Growing Up Down's		Maverick Television / Dartmouth Films	United Kingdom
2016	War of Lies	Krieg der Lügen	Zischlermann Filmproduktion	Netherlands
2016	Mothers of Plaza de Mayo - The Story	Madres de Plaza de Mayo	El Perro en la Luna	Argentina
2016	Mom & Clarinet		KBS / Upright Media	South Korea
2016	My Son the Jihadi		True Vision Productions	United Kingdom
2017	EXODUS: Our Journey to Europe		KEO Films / BBC 2	United Kingdom
2017	The Phone of the Wind: Whispers to Lost Families		NHK	Japan
2017	Terror Studios	Le Studio de la Terreur	Capa Presse / Canal+	France
2017	Tempestad		Pimienta Films / Cactus Films / Terminal	Mexico
2018	Goodbye Aleppo		BBC Arabic	United Kingdom
2018	This Is Me	Eu Sou Assim	GNT / TV Zero	Brazil
2018	Puck's World	De Wereld van Puck	KURTA / EO Television	Netherlands
2018	Who I Am		WOWOW / Acrobat Film	Japan
2019	Bellingcat: Truth in a Post-Truth World		Submarine Amsterdam / VPRO	Netherlands
2019	The First Stone – The Rise of Lynching in Brazil	A Primeira Pedra	Canal Futura / Couro de Rato	Brazil
2019	Louis Theroux's Altered States		BBC Studios	United Kingdom
2019	Witness: "India's Forbidden Love"		Grain Media / AJE Witness	Qatar

=== 2020s ===
Year	English title	Original title	Production company/Network	Country
2020	For Sama		Channel 4	United Kingdom
2020	The Witness	El testigo	Caracol Televisión	Colombia
2020	Granni-E-minem		KBS	South Korea
2020	Back to Rwanda	Terug naar Rwanda	De Chinezen / VRT Belgium	Belgium
2021	Hope Frozen: A Quest to Live Twice		2050 Productions / Netflix	Thailand
2021	Sieged	Cercados	Original Globoplay / Globo Jornalism	Brazil
2021	They Call Me Babu		Pieter van Huystee Film	Netherlands
2021	Toxic Beauty		White Pine Pictures	Canada
2022	Iraq's Lost Generation	Enfants de Daech, Les Damnés de la Guerre	Cinétévé / France Televisions / LCP / RTS / DR / NRK / SVT / Région Ile-de-France / CNC / PROCIREP – ANGOA	France
2022	Myanmar Coup: Digital Resistance		NHK	Japan
2022	The Return: Life After ISIS		Sky / Alba Sotorra Productions / MetFilm	United Kingdom
2022	The Evandro Case: A Devilish Plot	O Caso Evandro	Globoplay / Glaz Entretenimento	Brazil
2023	Mariupol: The People's Story		Top Hat Productions / Hayloft Productions / BBC	United Kingdom
2023	Dossiê Chapecó – O Jogo Por Trás Da Tragédia		Warner Bros. Discovery / Pacha Films	Brazil
2023	Nazi Hunter – Journey Into Darkness	Nazijäger – Reise In Die Finsternis	Spiegel TV	Germany
2023	Witness: "Serigne vs. The EU"		Zungu / Al Jazeera English	Qatar
2024	Otto Baxter: Not a F**ing Horror Story		Story Films / Archface Films / Sky Documentaries	United Kingdom
2024	The Billionaire, the Butler and the Boyfriend	L'affaire Bettencourt : Scandale chez la femme la plus riche du monde	Quadbox / Netflix	France
2024	The Exiles		Mediacorp	Singapore
2024	Transo		FRM / Canal Futura / LateForCake	Brazil
2025	Hell Jumper		Expectation Entertainment for the BBC	United Kingdom
2025	King of Kings: Chasing Edward Jones		Abelart Productions	France
2025	It's My Pleasure	O Prazer é Meu	Amana Cine	Brazil
2025	School Ties		IdeaCandy	South Africa
2026	Louis Theroux: The Settlers		Mindhouse Productions	United Kingdom
2026	Marcial Maciel: The Wolf of God	Marcial Maciel: El lobo de Dios	Warner Bros. Discovery / Anima Films	Mexico
2026	One "Orphan" Every Hour		Mediacorp Pte Ltd	Singapore
2026	Addiction Criminals	Opioïdes, Business & Addiction	Premières Lignes / France Télévisions	France

== Breakdown ==
United Kingdom has the most awards for this category with 23 (including wins for both BBC and Channel 4).
