= International Emmy Award for Drama =

International Emmy Award for Best Drama
- Country: United States
- Presented by: International Academy of Television Arts and Sciences
- First award: 1979
- Currently held by: Dirty Tricks, United Kingdom (2001)
- Website: www.iemmys.tv

The International Emmy for Best Drama is an extinct category of the International Emmy Awards, presented by the International Academy of Television Arts and Sciences. It was one of the first award categories, which highlights international drama genre of programs produced and displayed outside the United States. It was first awarded in 1979 with BBC's television film On Giant's Shoulders being the first recipient of the award.

The category was presented from 1979 to 2001. In 2002, the category was replaced with the Best Drama Series category.

== Winners and nominees ==
=== 1980s ===
Year	English title	Original title	Production company/Network	Country
1979	On Giant's Shoulders		BBC Two	United Kingdom

=== 1980s ===
Year	English title	Original title	Production company/Network	Country
1980	A Rod of Iron		Yorkshire Television	United Kingdom
1981	A Town Like Alice		Seven Network / Mariner Films	Australia
1982	A Voyage Round My Father		Thames Television	United Kingdom
1983	King Lear		Granada Television	United Kingdom
1984	The Jewel in the Crown		Granada Television	United Kingdom
1985	Das Boot		Bavaria Atelier / Westdeutscher Rundfunk / SWR Fernsehen	Germany
1986	Shadowlands		BBC / Gateway Films / The Episcopal Radio-TV Foundation / Lella Production	United Kingdom
1987	Porterhouse Blue		Channel 4 / Picture Partnership Productions	United Kingdom
1988	A Very British Coup		Channel 4 / Skreba Films	United Kingdom
1989	Traffik		Channel 4 / Picture Partnership Pictures	United Kingdom

=== 1990s ===
Year	English title	Original title	Production company/Network	Country
1990	First and Last		BBC Television	United Kingdom
1991	The Black Velvet Gown		World Wide International Television / Tyne Tees Television	United Kingdom
1991	The End of Innocence		WDR / Redaktion Fernsehspiel	Germany
1991	The World of Eddie Weary		Yorkshire Television	United Kingdom
1992	A Dangerous Man: Lawrence After Arabia		Enigma TV / Angelika Films / Sands Films / WNET	United Kingdom
1992	Brides of Christ		ABC	Australia
1992	A Sense of History		Channel 4	United Kingdom
1993	Unnatural Pursuits		BBC Television / A&E	United Kingdom
1993	Blueprint		Sveriges Television	Sweden
1993	The Keiretsu		NHK	Japan
1994	Screen One: "The Bullion Boys"		BBC Television / Mentorn Films	United Kingdom
1995	The Politician's Wife		Channel 4	United Kingdom
1995	Smile Through Your Tears: The Tale of Seijiro Shimada		NHK	Japan
1995	Cold Comfort Farm		Thames Television	United Kingdom
1996	La Colline aux Mille Enfants		King Movies / Cameras Continentales / France 2 / France 3 / Productions 7 / Telemax / RAI / SF DRS / Evan Omroep / NFI Productions / Bernard Lang	Netherlands
1997	Crossing the Floor		BBC Two / Hat Trick Productions	United Kingdom
1998	The Tattooed Widow	Den tatuerade änkan	Sveriges Television	Sweden
1998	White Lies		Canadian Broadcasting Corporation	Canada
1998	Das Urteil		NDR	Germany
1999	Lost for Words		Yorkshire Television / Bard Entertainment	United Kingdom

=== 2000s ===
Year	English title	Original title	Production company/Network	Country
2000	All Stars		VARA / M+B Film	Netherlands
2000	Longitude		Channel 4	United Kingdom
2000	Warriors		BBC One	United Kingdom
2001	Dirty Tricks		Carlton Television / Little Bird Productions	United Kingdom
2001	Fatou la Malienne		France 2	France
2001	Anniversaries	Jahrestage	ARD	Germany
2001	Cold Feet		ITV	United Kingdom
