= Life Goes On =

Life Goes On may refer to:

== Film and television ==
- Life Goes On (1932 film), a British film directed by Jack Raymond
- Life Goes On (1938 film), an American film directed by William Nolte
- Life Goes On (1941 film), a Swedish film directed by Anders Henrikson
- Life Goes On (1965 film), a Spanish melodrama film
- Life Goes On (2002 film) (Das Leben geht weiter), a German documentary film directed by Mark Cairns
- Life Goes On (2009 film), a British film directed by Sangeeta Datta
- Life Goes On (TV series), a 1989–1993 American drama series
- "Life Goes On" (Empty Nest), a two-part television episode

== Music ==
=== Albums ===
- Life Goes On (Carla Bley album) or the title song, 2020
- Life Goes On (The Desert Rose Band album) or the title song, 1993
- Life Goes On (Donell Jones album) or the title song, 2002
- Life Goes On (Gerry Rafferty album) or the title song, 2009
- Life Goes On (Lil Suzy album), 1995
- Life Goes On (Onew album) or the title song, 2022
- Life Goes On (Paul Williams album) or the title song, 1972
- Life Goes On (Sash! album) or the title song, 1998
- Life Goes On (Stevie Holland album) or the title song, 2015
- Life Goes On (Terri Clark album) or the title song, 2005
- Life Goes On (Trae album), or the title song, 2007
- Life Goes On EP or the title song, by the B.E. Taylor Group, 1984
- Life Goes On, or the title song, by the Adicts, 2009
- Life Goes On, or the title song, by Norm Brunet, 2002

=== Songs ===
- "Life Goes On" (Ai song), 2023
- "Life Goes On" (BTS song), 2020
- "Life Goes On" (E^ST song), 2017
- "Life Goes On" (Ed Sheeran song), 2023
- "Life Goes On" (Elisa song), 2004
- "Life Goes On" (Fergie song), 2016
- "Life Goes On" (Gym Class Heroes song), 2011
- "Life Goes On" (The Kinks song), 1977
- "Life Goes On" (LeAnn Rimes song), 2002
- "Life Goes On" (Lil Baby song), 2018
- "Life Goes On" (Little Texas song), 1995
- "Life Goes On" (Oliver Tree song), 2021
- "Life Goes On" (Poison song), 1991
- "L.I.F.E.G.O.E.S.O.N.", by Noah and the Whale, 2011
- "Life Goes On", by Bobby Vinton from Mr. Lonely, 1964
- "Life Goes On", by Cuban Link and Syleena Johnson from Chain Reaction, 2005
- "Life Goes On", by the Damned from Strawberries, 1982
- "Life Goes On", by Dragon Ash, 2002
- "Life Goes On", by Jeff Watson from Around the Sun, 1993
- "Life Goes On", by Lil Mosey, 2024
- "Life Goes On", by Mika Arisaka, featured in Mobile Suit Gundam SEED Destiny
- "Life Goes On", by Nik Kershaw from Radio Musicola, 1986
- "Life Goes On", by Sérgio Mendes from Brasil '88, 1978
- "Life Goes On", by the Sundays, a B-side of the single "Cry", 1997
- "Life Goes On", by Tupac Shakur from All Eyez on Me, 1996
- "Life Goes On", by U-ya Asaoka, opening theme for Chouseishin Gransazer
- "Life Goes On", by Mikis Theodorakis, from Zorba the Greek, 1964

== Other media ==
- "Life Goes On" (news article), a Russian newspaper article about the start of the 2008 South Ossetia war
- Life Goes On, a 2012 novel by Hans Keilson

== See also ==
- And Life Goes On, a 1992 Iranian film
- "Ob-La-Di, Ob-La-Da", a 1968 song by the Beatles, the lyrics of which repeat the phrase "Life goes on"
- "Life Goes On & On", a song by Home Made Kazoku
