= Kapo (disambiguation) =

A kapo was a privileged prisoner who served as a barracks supervisor/warder or led work details in a Nazi concentration camp.

Kapo or KAPO may also refer to one of the following:

== Culture ==
- Kapo (mythology), a Hawaiian goddess or god
- Kapo (1960 film), an Italian film about the Holocaust
- Kapo (2000 film), an Israeli documentary about Jewish kapos who collaborated with the Nazis during World War II
- Kapo!, a studio album by the neo-folk band Death In June
- Kapo, a novel by Serbian novelist Aleksandar Tišma

== Organisations ==
- Kazan Aircraft Production Association, a Russian aircraft manufacturer
- KAPO or KaPo, an acronym for Kaitsepolitsei, the state security agency of Estonia
- KAPO, an acronym for Kantonspolizei, Swiss cantonal police

== People ==
- Kapo (singer) (born 1997), Colombian singer
- Aurora Kapo (born 2000), Albanian singer
- Hysni Kapo (1915–1979), Albanian military commander and leading member of the Party of Labour of Albania
- Maxen Kapo (born 2001), French professional footballer
- Olivier Kapo (born 1980), retired French footballer
- Vito Kapo (1922–2020), Albanian politician
- Mallica Reynolds (1911–1989), Jamaican artist that went by the name Kapo

== See also ==
- Capo (disambiguation)
- Kapow (disambiguation)
