= 1985 Emmy Awards =

1985 Emmy Awards may refer to:

- 37th Primetime Emmy Awards, the 1985 Emmy Awards ceremony honoring primetime programming
- 12th Daytime Emmy Awards, the 1985 Emmy Awards ceremony honoring daytime programming
- 13th International Emmy Awards, the 1985 Emmy Awards ceremony honoring international programming

| Preceded by 1984 | Emmy Awards; 1985 | Succeeded by 1986 |
