= David Darlow =

David Darlow may refer to:

- David Darlow (film producer) (born 1942), British film producer and director
- David Darlow (actor) (born 1943), American actor and stage director
