= 1982 Emmy Awards =

1982 Emmy Awards may refer to:

- 34th Primetime Emmy Awards, the 1982 Emmy Awards ceremony honoring primetime programming
- 9th Daytime Emmy Awards, the 1982 Emmy Awards ceremony honoring daytime programming
- 10th International Emmy Awards, the 1982 Emmy Awards ceremony honoring international programming

| Preceded by 1981 | Emmy Awards; 1982 | Succeeded by 1983 |
