= 1992 Emmy Awards =

1992 Emmy Awards may refer to:

- 44th Primetime Emmy Awards, the 1992 Emmy Awards ceremony honoring primetime programming
- 19th Daytime Emmy Awards, the 1992 Emmy Awards ceremony honoring daytime programming
- 20th International Emmy Awards, the 1992 Emmy Awards ceremony honoring international programming

Preceded by 1991	Emmy Awards; 1992	Succeeded by 1993
