= 1987 Emmy Awards =

1987 Emmy Awards may refer to:

- 39th Primetime Emmy Awards, the 1987 Emmy Awards ceremony honoring primetime programming
- 14th Daytime Emmy Awards, the 1987 Emmy Awards ceremony honoring daytime programming
- 15th International Emmy Awards, the 1987 Emmy Awards ceremony honoring international programming

Preceded by 1986	Emmy Awards; 1987	Succeeded by 1988
