= 1996 Emmy Awards =

1996 Emmy Awards may refer to:

- 48th Primetime Emmy Awards, the 1996 Emmy Awards ceremony honoring primetime programming during June 1995 – May 1996
- 23rd Daytime Emmy Awards, the 1996 Emmy Awards ceremony honoring daytime programming during 1995
- 24th International Emmy Awards, honoring international programming

Preceded by 1995	Emmy Awards; 1996	Succeeded by 1997
