= 1980 Emmy Awards =

1980 Emmy Awards may refer to:

- 32nd Primetime Emmy Awards, the 1980 Emmy Awards ceremony that honored primetime programming during June 1979 – May 1980
- 7th Daytime Emmy Awards, the 1980 Emmy Awards ceremony honoring daytime programming during 1979
- 8th International Emmy Awards, the 1980 Emmy Awards ceremony honoring international programming

| Preceded by 1979 | Emmy Awards; 1980 | Succeeded by 1981 |
