= 1999 Emmy Awards =

1999 Emmy Awards may refer to:

- 51st Primetime Emmy Awards, the 1999 Emmy Awards ceremony honoring primetime programming during June 1998 – May 1999
- 26th Daytime Emmy Awards, the 1999 Emmy Awards ceremony honoring daytime programming during 1998
- 27th International Emmy Awards, honoring international programming

Preceded by 1998	Emmy Awards; 1999	Succeeded by 2000
