= 1984 Emmy Awards =

1984 Emmy Awards may refer to:

- 36th Primetime Emmy Awards, the 1984 Emmy Awards ceremony honoring primetime programming
- 11th Daytime Emmy Awards, the 1984 Emmy Awards ceremony honoring daytime programming
- 12th International Emmy Awards, the 1984 Emmy Awards ceremony honoring international programming

| Preceded by 1983 | Emmy Awards; 1984 | Succeeded by 1985 |
