= 1998 Emmy Awards =

1998 Emmy Awards may refer to:

- 50th Primetime Emmy Awards, the 1998 Emmy Awards ceremony honoring primetime programming during June 1997 – May 1998
- 25th Daytime Emmy Awards, the 1998 Emmy Awards ceremony honoring daytime programming during 1997
- 26th International Emmy Awards, honoring international programming

Preceded by 1997	Emmy Awards; 1998	Succeeded by 1999
