= 2001 Emmy Awards =

2001 Emmy Awards may refer to:

- 53rd Primetime Emmy Awards, the 2001 Emmy Awards ceremony honoring primetime programming June 2000 – May 2001
- 28th Daytime Emmy Awards, the 2001 Emmy Awards ceremony honoring daytime programming during 2000
- 29th International Emmy Awards, honoring international programming

Preceded by 2000	Emmy Awards; 2001	Succeeded by 2002
