= 1986 Emmy Awards =

1986 Emmy Awards may refer to:

- 38th Primetime Emmy Awards, the 1986 Emmy Awards ceremony honoring primetime programming
- 13th Daytime Emmy Awards, the 1986 Emmy Awards ceremony honoring daytime programming
- 14th International Emmy Awards, the 1986 Emmy Awards ceremony honoring international programming

Preceded by 1985	Emmy Awards; 1986	Succeeded by 1987
