= 1981 Emmy Awards =

1981 Emmy Awards may refer to:

- 33rd Primetime Emmy Awards, the 1981 Emmy Awards ceremony honoring primetime programming
- 8th Daytime Emmy Awards, the 1981 Emmy Awards ceremony honoring daytime programming
- 9th International Emmy Awards, the 1981 Emmy Awards ceremony honoring international programming

Preceded by 1980	Emmy Awards; 1981	Succeeded by 1982
