= Capo =

Capo or capos, may refer to:

== Designation, akin to captain ==
- Capo, short for Caporegime, a rank in the Mafia
- Capo dei capi, or capo di tutti capi, Italian for 'boss of bosses', a phrase used to indicate a powerful individual in organized crime
- Kapo, a prisoner in a concentration camp who supervised forced labor or carried out tasks delegated by Nazi guards

== People ==
- Capo (surname)
- Pedro Capó, also known as Capó, singer-songwriter from Puerto Rico
- Capo (rapper) (born 1991), German rapper
- Capo, nom de guerre of Vlado Janić (1904–1991), Croatian and Yugoslav politician
- Jim Jones (rapper) (born 1976), also known as CAPO, American rapper
- Los Capos, Mexican Lucha Libre pro-wrestlers

== Places ==
- Acquarica del Capo, town and commune in the Italian province of Lecce in the Apulia region of southeast Italy
- Capistrano Valley High School, commonly known as Capo
- Capo d'Orlando, a commune in the Italian province of Messina, in Sicily
- Capo di Ponte, a commune in the Italian province of Brescia, in Lombardy
- Capo Sandalo Lighthouse, a lighthouse on San Pietro Island, Sardinia, Italy
- Capo Vaticano, a wide bathing place of the Municipality of Ricadi in Calabria, Italy
- Rural Municipality of Elcapo No. 154, Saskatchewan, Canada

== Music ==
- Capo (musical device), a device that is attached to the frets of a string instrument to raise the pitch of each string
- Capo (album), 2011, by American rapper Jim Jones
- El Capo (album), 2019, by Jim Jones
- "Capo", a 2018 single by American rapper NLE Choppa
- "Capo", a song by Bizzy Bone and Capo-Confucius, from the album Alpha and Omega

== Other uses ==
- Harkonnen Capo Chair, one of H. R. Giger's furniture designs
- El Capo (TV series), 2009 Colombian drama TV series about a drug lord, a.k.a. Marlon Moreno El Capo
- El Capo (2016 TV series), Mexican telenovela

== See also ==
- Da capo (disambiguation)
- Kapo (disambiguation)
- Capo di tutti capi (mafioso title) boss of all bosses
- Capodecina (mafioso title) boss of a squad in the Cosa Nostra
- Capomandamento (mafioso title) boss of a clan in the Cosa Nostra
- El Capo de Capos (born 1949) Mexican pro-wrestler
- Il Capo dei Capi, a 2007 TV miniseries
