= Emmy Award for Best Television Documentary =

Emmy Award for Best Television Documentary may refer to the following Emmy Awards:

- News & Documentary Emmy Award
- Primetime Emmy Award for Outstanding Documentary or Nonfiction Series
- Primetime Emmy Award for Outstanding Documentary or Nonfiction Special
- International Emmy Award for Best Documentary
