= 1979 Emmy Awards =

1979 Emmy Awards may refer to:

- 31st Primetime Emmy Awards, the 1979 Emmy Awards ceremony honoring primetime programming
- 6th Daytime Emmy Awards, the 1979 Emmy Awards ceremony honoring daytime programming
- 7th International Emmy Awards, the 1979 Emmy Awards ceremony honoring international programming

Preceded by 1978	Emmy Awards; 1979	Succeeded by 1980
