= 1995 Emmy Awards =

1995 Emmy Awards may refer to:

- 47th Primetime Emmy Awards, the 1995 Emmy Awards ceremony honoring primetime programming during June 1994 – May 1995
- 22nd Daytime Emmy Awards, the 1995 Emmy Awards ceremony honoring daytime programming during 1994
- 23rd International Emmy Awards, honoring international programming

Preceded by 1994	Emmy Awards; 1995	Succeeded by 1996
