= 1990 Emmy Awards =

1990 Emmy Awards may refer to:

- 42nd Primetime Emmy Awards, the 1990 Emmy Awards ceremony honoring primetime programming
- 17th Daytime Emmy Awards, the 1990 Emmy Awards ceremony honoring daytime programming
- 18th International Emmy Awards, the 1990 Emmy Awards ceremony honoring international programming

Preceded by 1989	Emmy Awards; 1990	Succeeded by 1991
