= 1989 Emmy Awards =

1989 Emmy Awards may refer to:

- 41st Primetime Emmy Awards, the 1989 Emmy Awards ceremony honoring primetime programming
- 16th Daytime Emmy Awards, the 1989 Emmy Awards ceremony honoring daytime programming
- 17th International Emmy Awards, the 1989 Emmy Awards ceremony honoring international programming

Preceded by 1988	Emmy Awards; 1989	Succeeded by 1990
