= 28th International Emmy Awards =

2000 awards ceremony

- Date: November 20, 2000
- Location: Sheraton New York Times Square Hotel; New York City
- Hosted by: Tom Bergeron

Highlights
- Founders Award: John Hendricks

The 28th International Emmy Awards took place on November 20, 2000 in New York City and was hosted by American television personality Tom Bergeron. The award ceremony, presented by the International Academy of Television Arts and Sciences (IATAS), honors all programming produced and originally aired outside the United States.

The award ceremony was broadcast in Turkey, China, Italy, Latin America, Canada and several other countries as well as on the Internet.

== Ceremony ==
The nominees for the 28th International Emmys Awards were announced by the International Academy of Television Arts and Sciences on October 17, 2000, at a press conference at MIPCOM in Cannes. The United Kingdom dominated the nominations for the International Emmys, of the 21 programs indicated, 12 of them were from Britain. A record number of 549 programs were entered for this edition. BBC's Gloriana, a film was honored in the performing arts category. This was followed by another BBC honour – shared with independent outfit Kudos – for children's show The Magician's House. The award for outstanding news coverage went to ITN journalist Mark Austin and cameraman Andy Rex for their coverage of the floods in Mozambique. Channel Four won the popular arts category for Smack the Pony in which Britain's top female comics pool their talents in a series of all-women comedy sketches.

The best drama category went to the Netherlands's All Stars, produced by NOS and VARA Broadcasting Organizations. All Stars is based on the Dutch feature film with the same title and cast, is a comedy series about the lives of seven twenty-something pals. The documentary category was won by Israel's Kapo, based on trials held in Israel in the 1950s and 1960s of Jewish Holocaust survivors. Arts documentary honors went to The Jazzman from the Gulag, a France 3 production that dealt with the life of Eddie Rosner, a German-born jazz musician of Polish Jewish descent who was dubbed by Louis Armstrong as the "White Armstrong."

== Winners ==
Best Drama Series	Best Popular Arts Program
All Stars - Netherlands (VARA/M+B Film); Longitude - United Kingdom (Channel 4); Warriors - United Kingdom (BBC)	Smack the Pony - United Kingdom (Channel 4); Da Ali G Show - United Kingdom (Channel 4); Caiga Quien Caiga - Argentina (Cuatro Cabezas)
Best Documentary	Best Arts Documentary
Kapo - Israel (RAI 3/Spiegel TV); Stolen Generations - Australia (Jotz Productions); Playing the China Card: Nixon and Mao - United Kingdom (Channel 4/WGBH-TV)	The Jazzman from the Gulag - France (France 3/Ideale Audience); Tell Me the Truth about Love - United Kingdom (BBC); Howard Goodall's Big Bangs - United Kingdom (Tiger Aspect Productions)
Best Performing Arts Program	Best Children & Young People Program
Gloriana - United Kingdom (BBC); Masterworks: Six Pieces of Britain - United Kingdom (BBC); Ode to Joy: 10,000 Voices Resound - Japan (MBS)	The Magician's House - United Kingdom (BBC); Street Cents - Canada (CBC); De Daltons - Netherlands (VPRO)
Best News Coverage
2000 Mozambique flood - United Kingdom (ITN); Russian army attacks Chechnya - United Kingdom (BBC); Chile: Torturers Running Free - France (M6)
