= We Are Bellingcat =

2021 nonfiction book by Eliot Higgins

We Are Bellingcat: Global Crime, Online Sleuths, and the Bold Future of News
- Author: Eliot Higgins
- Language: English
- Published: 2 March 2021
- Publisher: Bloomsbury Publishing
- Publication place: UK
- Pages: 272
- ISBN: 978-1635577303

We Are Bellingcat: Global Crime, Online Sleuths, and the Bold Future of News is a 2021 autobiographical account of open source investigative journalism by Eliot Higgins.

The book focusses on the career of Higgins, his role in founding Bellingcat and the organisation's use of social media data to investigate of criminal acts, frequently undertaken by the Russian state forces.

== Publication ==
We Are Bellingcat was published in 2021 by Bloomsbury.

== Synopsis ==
The book covers Higgins' life as a college drop out, his blogging, and his hobby of using Google Earth to ascertain the precise location of violent events. It documents his online activity analysing the First Libyan Civil War while working his "dead end job".

It describes the creation of Bellingcat in 2014, and Higgins' work investigating the downing of Malaysia Airlines Flight 17, which used images gathered from social media to demonstrate that the plane was shot down using a Russian Buk missile system. It also documents investigations into Bashar al-Assad's use of chemical weapons in Syria, neo-Nazi activity in Charlottesville, and Russia's involvement in the poisonings of Sergei and Yulia Skripal and of Alexei Navalny.

The book documents Higgins' role on the Technology Advisory Board of the International Criminal Court.

== Critical reception ==
Amy Zegart writing in Foreign Policy describes it as a "memoir, manifesto, and police procedural: CSI for the international relations set." Zegart also notes Higgins' tendency to focus on the upside of open source citizen journalism without comparable reflection on the associated potential risks.

Anne Harris, writing in The Irish Times describes the book as a demanding read, and "thrilling". Peter Neville-Hadley, writing in the South China Morning Post praised the book for its openness, letting readers judge things for themselves.

Both The Times and The Week identified We Are Bellingcat as their book of the week, in February 2021. The Week described it as "deeply impressive".

Jonathan Green, writing in The New York Times described it as "powerful" and an "exhortatory call to arms".

== See also ==
- Open-source journalism
- Citizen journalism
- Bellingcat: Truth in a Post-Truth World (film)
