= Coded Hostile =

1989 British television film

- Coded Hostile title
- Written by: Brian Phelan
- Directed by: David Darlow
- Starring: Michael Murphy; Michael Moriarty; Chris Sarandon
- Composer: David Ferguson
- Country of origin: United Kingdom
- Original languages: English, Korean, Russian

Production
- Producer: John Smithson
- Cinematography: Witold Stok
- Editor: Chris Gill
- Running time: 82 minutes
- Production companies: Granada Television; HBO Showcase

Original release
- Network: ITV
- Release: September 7, 1989

Coded Hostile, also known in the United States, and in other international jurisdictions, as Tailspin: Behind the Korean Airliner Tragedy, is a 1989 British television film directed by David Darlow and written by Brian Phelan, about the real life shoot-down of Korean Air Flight 007. The film stars Michael Murphy, Michael Moriarty and Chris Sarandon. It was produced by Granada Television, and first screened on ITV on 7 September 1989. A revised version was screened by Channel 4 on 31 August 1993 to include details of subsequent events.

== Plot ==
The film examines the 1983 downing of Korean Air Lines Flight 007, which entered Soviet airspace during a flight from New York to Seoul and was shot down by a Soviet MiG-23 fighter over the Sea of Japan, killing all 269 people aboard. Using interviews and intelligence material, the film focuses on the subsequent discussions in Washington and explores whether the incident was a tragic accident or a deliberate provocation.

== Cast ==
STATE DEPARTMENT:

- Michael Murphy as Assistant U.S. Secretary of State Richard Burt
- Debora Weston as Carol
- Colin Bruce as Dave
- Marc Smith as Mort
- Bill Bailey as Military
- Peter Whitman and Francine Body as Watch Officers
- Alexander Webb as Aide

PENTAGON:

- Michael Moriarty as Major Hank Daniels
- Harris Yulin as General Tyson
- Jay Patterson as Gene
- Shane Rimmer as Admiral Riley
- Nic D'Avirro as Norman
- Weston Gavin as Vince
- Stephen Hoye as Captain Beales
- Eugene Brell and Colin Stinson as Operators
- Thomasine Heiner as Mrs. Tyson

NATIONAL SECURITY COUNCIL:

- Chris Sarandon as John Lenczowski
- Rolf Saxon as Frank
- Lee Calder as Secretary
- Angus MacInnes as Marilees
- William Roberts as Villiger
- Vincent Marzello as Military Rep
- Brian Greene as Staff Member
- Cliff Taylor as Typist

MISAWA LISTENING POST:

- Ed O'Ross as Sergeant Duffy
- Gavan O'Herlihy as Sergeant Muller
- George Roth as Captain Ames
- Mark Burton as Levin
- Otto Jarman as Clark
- Bradley Lavelle as Jamie
- Kieron Jecchinis as Coles
- Matthew Freeman as Aaron
- Andrea Browne and James Tillitt as Operatives

COBRA BALL:

- Keith Edwards as Officer
- Robert Jezek as Co-Pilot

TV NEWS:

- Garrick Hagon as Anchorman
- Jana Shelden as Jane Leonart

LAWYERS:

- Michael Shannon as Grover
- Joris Stuyck as Sherman

SOVIET AIR DEFENCES:

- Tomasz Borkowy as Major Kasmin
- Boris Isarov as Commander
- Alexei Jawdokimov as Aide
- Stéphane Cornicard as Radar Operator

KOREAN AIRLINES:

- Togo Igawa as Captain Chun
- Takeshi Kawahara as Co-Pilot Flight 007
- Soon-Tek Oh as Captain Park
- Eddie Yeo as Co-Pilot Flight 015

== International broadcasts ==
The film was first shown by HBO in the United States as Tailspin: Behind the Korean Airliner Tragedy on 20 August 1989.

== See also ==
- Shootdown
