= Norbert Smith: A Life =

1989 British TV mockumentary film

- Genre: Mockumentary
- Written by: Harry Enfield; Geoffrey Perkins
- Directed by: Geoff Posner
- Starring: Harry Enfield
- Narrated by: Melvyn Bragg
- Theme music composer: David Firman

Production
- Producer: Geoffrey Perkins
- Running time: 47 minutes
- Production company: Hat Trick Productions

Original release
- Network: Channel 4
- Release: 3 November 1989

Norbert Smith: A Life (also known as Sir Norbert Smith: A Life), is a 1989 mockumentary (spoof documentary) television film, charting the life and career of the fictitious British actor Sir Norbert Smith. It stars Harry Enfield in the title role. It was written by Enfield and Geoffrey Perkins and directed by Geoff Posner.

== Summary ==
The film is presented as if it were an edition of the ITV arts programme The South Bank Show, commemorating the 80th birthday of Sir Norbert Smith, a celebrated British actor. Melvyn Bragg, the real-life presenter of The South Bank Show, plays himself, visiting Sir Norbert at his home and encouraging him to reminisce about his career. Bragg also talks with people who worked with Sir Norbert over the years. The interviews, scattered through the film, gradually reveal that although Sir Norbert is acclaimed as one of Britain's "Knights of the Theatre", a star Shakespearean actor in the mould of Laurence Olivier or John Gielgud, none of his contemporaries has anything particularly good to say about him, and that the elderly Sir Norbert himself has confused and unreliable memories about his past. The film's main focus, however, is to look back upon Sir Norbert's career as an actor, using interspersed clips featuring his various film roles.

Born in South London in 1909, the young Norbert visits the Peckham Empire theatre and grows fond of the music hall. He launches into film, playing a supporting role in Oh, Mr Bankrobber! (1936), starring the beloved British comedian Will Silly. He climbs his way to stardom in Rebel Without a Tie (1937), in which he plays a petty criminal who, after a clip round the ear from a policeman, suddenly sees the error of his ways and is reformed. With the outbreak of World War II, Smith goes to Hollywood to star in musicals such as Lullaby of London (1940), but returns to Britain in time to produce public information films for the war effort, including Venereal Disease: The Facts (1941), in which he speaks direct to camera, in deadly earnest, about the dangers of sexually transmitted disease. However, due to the film censorship and prudishness prevalent at the time, he cannot convey any useful information at all; any reference to the disease is hidden behind euphemisms such as "unmentionables".

Smith returns to more traditional roles by directing and starring in a series of Shakespeare productions for the stage and screen, including Hamlet (1949), with a screenplay "adapted in collaboration with Noël Coward". These works and his appearance in a much-lauded commercial for Sudso washing detergent, helped establish him as one of his generation's foremost actors. Smith marries Mazie Mitford and, in 1955, founds the Norbert Studios, which produce British Westerns such as They Called Him Stranger (1955) as well as a series of British comedies including Passport to Puddlewitch (starring the comedian Dick Dotty) and Whimsy Galore. Smith also appears in the drama Mozart: Man of Music (1957), remaking it as Beethoven: Man of Music in 1958 and as Andrew Lloyd Webber: Man of Music in 1984.

Smith is knighted for his contributions to the British stage and screen. As Sir Norbert, he appears in It's Grim Up North (1962), in which he plays the father of a poor working class household, unable to exert any authority over his family, and over his rebellious adult son in particular: "If I find out who's taken my belt, I'll take my bloody belt to them". In a change of pace, he also appears in the rock musical Keep Your Hair On, Daddio (1962), starring the popular singer Davey Throb. Sir Norbert plays Throb's father, unable to appreciate the new beat music performed by Throb and his friends, but he finally grows to love the music scene, and joins in. Sir Norbert also features in Rover Returns Home (1964), a film notable for one of the first cinematic appearances of Michael Caine.

In the prestigious interview series Head to Head, however, it is implied that Sir Norbert's career is at its nadir and that he has a bad drink problem. This insinuation is confirmed by his next film, Dogs of Death, in which he and his fellow veteran cast members—Richard Smashed, Dick Booze, Oliver Guinness, and Peter O'Pissed—drink heavily on set, even when the camera is rolling. (In a two-way dialogue scene his glass has been re-filled each time the camera returns to him.) Sir Norbert's next film is another change of pace: Carry On Banging, set in the Greenham Common Women's Peace Camp of the 1980s. He then appears as a British butler in Martha (1983), and produces a biopic of Nelson Mandela, with Sir Norbert putting on blackface makeup for the title role. At 80, interviewed by Bragg, Sir Norbert has no current projects, but remains a well-loved icon among British actors.

== Cast ==
- Harry Enfield as Sir Norbert Smith
- Melvyn Bragg as Interviewer
- Charles Simon as Old duffer
- Stewart Harwood as Mr. Wilkinson
- Peter Goodwright as Will Silly
- George Raistrick as Melvyn Merry
- Renée Asherson as Lady Norbert
- Simon Godley as Barney
- Charles Pemberton as Policeman
- Moray Watson as Sir Donald Stuffy
- Josie Lawrence as Ruby Lawrence
- John Elmes as Horatio
- Felicity Montagu as Cecilia Johanson
- David Henry as Harry Crabbe
- Gareth Vaughan as Western mayor
- Con O'Neill as Davy Throb

== Parodies ==
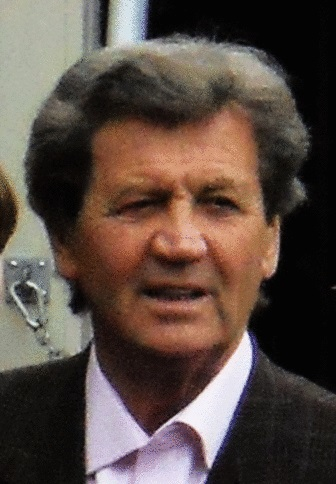
Melvyn Bragg hosts the film, recalling his similar role in the serious biography "Laurence Olivier: A Life"

The film's format satirises the style of television arts biography typified by The South Bank Show, especially "Laurence Olivier: A Life", a 1982 episode hosted by Melvyn Bragg; Enfield, as the aged Sir Norbert, is made up to look very much like the aged Sir Laurence interviewed in the episode. The interviews are similarly satirical, and provide considerable additional humour with their implied revelations about Sir Norbert's general mediocrity.

Most notably, however, each of the "clips" from Sir Norbert's career parodies a recognisable work, genre, or style. Oh, Mr Bankrobber! closely follows the style of Will Hay's comedy films, with Smith filling in as the "Albert" character (played by Graham Moffatt in the originals). Though the title hints at Rebel Without a Cause, the Rebel Without a Tie excerpt parodies pre-war British films, with a strong moralising tone, and possibly with a touch of The Blue Lamp. Lullaby of London is produced in the style of a Busby Berkeley musical, and also pokes fun at Hollywood's misinformed ideas about Britain (one lyric is "The Tower of London, where the President of England chopped off the heads of his wives"). Venereal Disease: The Facts is similarly general, spoofing public information films. The "Noël Coward" version of Hamlet, by contrast, was highly specific, parodying Coward's persona as well as the mise-en-scène for Laurence Olivier's 1948 film version of the play. (This spoof had previously appeared in producer Perkins' radio comedy series Radio Active.) The Sudso commercial is a parody of the film Brief Encounter, with Smith in the role played by Trevor Howard.

The next few excerpts return to lampoons of general styles: They Called Him Stranger satirises low-budget British attempts at producing home-grown Westerns in Technicolor, and each of the Man of Music films follow the clichés of historical costume drama and composer biographies. It’s Grim Up North spoofs the kitchen sink realism films of the early 1960s, with working class Northern English settings, such as Saturday Night and Sunday Morning. (Enfield noted in an interview that the popular later film Billy Elliott was done in the same style: "rainy British cinema.") Keep Your Hair On, Daddio parodies Cliff Richard's early 1960s rock musical films, especially The Young Ones. Rover Returns Home imagines a poor British attempt at replicating the American Lassie films, and also pokes fun at the acting "versatility" of Michael Caine, as it is implied that Caine plays the role of the dog Rover, dressed up in a dog suit.

The Head to Head interview parodies the TV series Face to Face, where interviewer John Freeman famously unsettled his guests by asking deeply personal questions; in the spoof Cyril Freebody throws insults rather than questions at Sir Norbert, e.g. "all the films you've been in have been total rubbish, and the last three made me physically vomit". Dogs of Death, the all-action World War II epic featuring a cast of veteran actors, parodies films such as Where Eagles Dare and The Wild Geese and suggests the hard-drinking, hell-raising behaviour associated with actors such as Richard Burton, Richard Harris, Oliver Reed and Peter O'Toole. Carry On Banging, presented as an excerpt from one of the Carry On films, features three actors from the genuine Carry On series: Barbara Windsor, Jack Douglas and Kenneth Connor. Sir Norbert's role as an impertinent butler in Martha mirrors Sir John Gielgud's role in the film Arthur, while his final project, attempting blackface for the Mandela biopic, parodies Olivier's "blackface" role in Othello and that of Alec Guinness in A Passage to India; the former is mentioned in the film, and when asked by Bragg why Sir Norbert cast himself in this role, despite public criticism, Sir Norbert replies "well, Sir Alec Guinness simply wasn't available".

== Release and reception ==
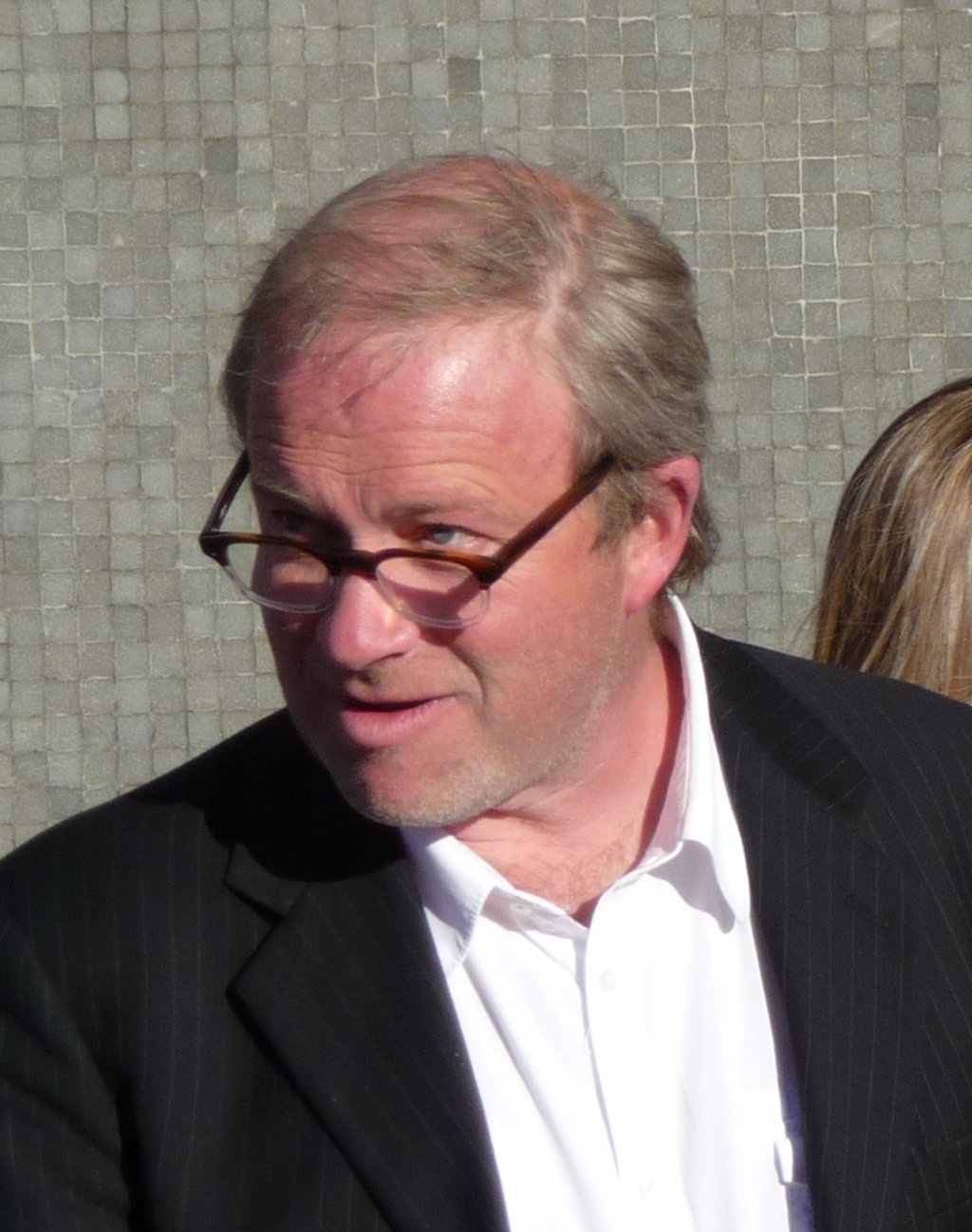
Harry Enfield continued parodying old-fashioned media in his later works

The film was made by Hat Trick Productions for Channel 4 and was first broadcast on 3 November 1989. David Morrison, in a British Film Institute essay, suggests that some of the film's humour may have been poorly received at the time because the broadcast occurred soon after Sir Laurence Olivier's death. However, Enfield insisted that the Sir Norbert character was meant to poke fun at a type, rather than a specific individual.

The public information film spoof became the basis for the Mr Cholmondley-Warner sketches in Enfield's subsequent TV sketch shows. Enfield also included an affectionate parody of Nelson Mandela in his sketch show Harry & Paul, evoking the Mandela biopic spoof. Norbert Smith also inspired BBC Two to commission a new mockumentary from Enfield and Paul Whitehouse in 2014, Harry and Paul's Story of the Twos, in commemoration of the channel's 50th anniversary.

In America, the film premiered as Sir Norbert Smith: A Life on PBS on 16 November 1990, as part of the Masterpiece Theatre series. In an Entertainment Weekly review, Ken Tucker described the film as an "agreeably silly little show-biz satire" and "a cross between Woody Allen's Zelig and Monty Python's Flying Circus". David Hiltbrand's review for People Magazine called it a "scabrously funny, mock-reverent look at the life and career of a venerable old actor" and a "marvelous jape." Michael Hill, in The Baltimore Sun, highlighted the film's placement in the distinguished PBS series: "[The film] sounds like just the sort of self-important biography of an upper crust British actor you'd expect to find on PBS' Great Performances … [but] not only has Great Performances taken the highly unusual step of putting on something funny, it's actually poking fun at itself." In The Los Angeles Times, Ray Loynd called the film "delicious, managing to be droll and pungent at the same time. Here's a show to tape and keep in your library and play back at parties." The film won the Popular Arts award at the 18th International Emmy Awards in 1990.

Jane Roscoe and Craig Hight's Faking It: Mock-Documentary and the Subversion of Factuality, an academic study of mockumentaries, mentions that the film "parod[ies] both the archetypical narratives of [Smith's] acting generation and a wide range of British (and American) cinematic styles." The film is classified as a "critique and hoax" of the documentary format, ranging it among a class of films that "explicitly highlight their own fictionality, but generally do so in order to ask their audience to reflect upon the validity of the cultural or political position of their subjects." In an essay for The Edinburgh Companion to Shakespeare and the Arts, Stephen Purcell notes that "the programme demystifies television's own conventions of mythologization," challenging the medium's traditional "sanctification of Shakespeare" by satirizing British Shakespearean actors in general and Olivier's film of Hamlet in particular.

== Home media ==
A VHS video version was released by Polygram Video in July 1991.

A DVD by Simply Media was released in July 2018.
