= 1988 Emmy Awards =

1988 Emmy Awards may refer to:

- 40th Primetime Emmy Awards, the 1988 Emmy Awards ceremony honoring primetime programming
- 15th Daytime Emmy Awards, the 1988 Emmy Awards ceremony honoring daytime programming
- 16th International Emmy Awards, the 1988 Emmy Awards ceremony honoring international programming

Preceded by 1987	Emmy Awards; 1988	Succeeded by 1989
