= 1997 Emmy Awards =

1997 Emmy Awards may refer to:

- 49th Primetime Emmy Awards, the 1997 Emmy Awards ceremony honoring primetime programming during June 1996 – May 1997
- 24th Daytime Emmy Awards, the 1997 Emmy Awards ceremony honoring daytime programming during 1996
- 25th International Emmy Awards, honoring international programming

Preceded by 1996	Emmy Awards; 1997	Succeeded by 1998
