= 1991 Emmy Awards =

1991 Emmy Awards may refer to:

- 43rd Primetime Emmy Awards, the 1991 Emmy Awards ceremony honoring primetime programming
- 18th Daytime Emmy Awards, the 1991 Emmy Awards ceremony honoring daytime programming
- 19th International Emmy Awards, the 1991 Emmy Awards ceremony honoring international programming

Preceded by 1990	Emmy Awards; 1991	Succeeded by 1992
