= 1978 Emmy Awards =

1978 Emmy Awards may refer to:

- 30th Primetime Emmy Awards, the 1978 Emmy Awards ceremony honoring primetime programming
- 5th Daytime Emmy Awards, the 1978 Emmy Awards ceremony honoring daytime programming
- 6th International Emmy Awards, the 1978 Emmy Awards ceremony honoring international programming

Preceded by 1977	Emmy Awards; 1978	Succeeded by 1979
