= 2000 Emmy Awards =

2000 Emmy Awards may refer to:

- 52nd Primetime Emmy Awards, the 2000 Emmy Awards ceremony honoring primetime programming June 1999 – May 2000
- 27th Daytime Emmy Awards, the 2000 Emmy Awards ceremony honoring daytime programming during 1999
- 38th International Emmy Awards, honoring international programming

Preceded by 1999	Emmy Awards; 2000	Succeeded by 2001
