= Kapow =

Kapow may refer to:

- Kapow Records, an American record label
- Kapow!, an American rock band led by Toshi Yano
- Kapow!, a programming block on Canadian TV channel Teletoon
- Ka-Pow!, an animated web spin-off of Happy Tree Friends
- KAPOW, a political organization founded by a former congressional candidate Kat Abughazaleh

== See also ==
- Kapo (disambiguation)
