= Da capo (disambiguation) =

Da capo is a musical term. Da Capo may also refer to:

== Music ==
- Da capo aria, a musical form prevalent in the Baroque era
- Da Capo (Ace of Base album) or the title song, 2002
- Da Capo (Love album), 1966
- Da Capo (Toy album), 2014
- Da Capo, an album by BAP, 1988
- Da Capo, an album by Renaissance, 1995
- Da Capo (EP), by April, 2020
- Dacapo Records, Danish classical music record label
- Da Capo (DJ), South African DJ and music producer

== Video games ==
- Da Capo (video game), 2002 Japanese video game
  - Da Capo II, 2006 sequel
  - Da Capo III, 2012 sequel

== Other uses ==
- Da Capo Press, an American book publisher
- Da Capo (1985 film), directed by Pirjo Honkasalo and Pekka Lehto
- Da-Capo, a chocolate bar produced by Fazer

== See also ==
- Capo (disambiguation)
- Da (disambiguation)
