= 1994 Emmy Awards =

1994 Emmy Awards may refer to:

- 46th Primetime Emmy Awards, the 1994 Emmy Awards ceremony honoring primetime programming
- 21st Daytime Emmy Awards, the 1994 Emmy Awards ceremony honoring daytime programming
- 22nd International Emmy Awards, the 1994 Emmy Awards ceremony honoring international programming

Preceded by 1993	Emmy Awards; 1994	Succeeded by 1995
