= 1977 Emmy Awards =

1977 Emmy Awards may refer to:

- 29th Primetime Emmy Awards, the 1977 Emmy Awards ceremony honoring primetime programming
- 4th Daytime Emmy Awards, the 1977 Emmy Awards ceremony honoring daytime programming
- 5th International Emmy Awards, the 1977 Emmy Awards ceremony honoring international programming

Preceded by 1976	Emmy Awards; 1977	Succeeded by 1978
