= 1993 Emmy Awards =

1993 Emmy Awards may refer to:

- 45th Primetime Emmy Awards, the 1993 Emmy Awards ceremony honoring primetime programming
- 20th Daytime Emmy Awards, the 1993 Emmy Awards ceremony honoring daytime programming
- 21st International Emmy Awards, the 1993 Emmy Awards ceremony honoring international programming

Preceded by 1992	Emmy Awards; 1993	Succeeded by 1994
