= 1983 Emmy Awards =

1983 Emmy Awards may refer to:

- 35th Primetime Emmy Awards, the 1983 Emmy Awards ceremony honoring primetime programming
- 10th Daytime Emmy Awards, the 1983 Emmy Awards ceremony honoring daytime programming
- 11th International Emmy Awards, the 1983 Emmy Awards ceremony honoring international programming

Preceded by 1982	Emmy Awards; 1983	Succeeded by 1984
