= 29th International Emmy Awards =

2001 awards ceremony

- Date: November 19, 2001
- Location: New York Hilton Midtown; New York City
- Hosted by: Tom Bergeron

Highlights
- Founders Award: Pierre Lescure

The 29th International Emmy Awards took place on November 19, 2001 in New York City and hosted by American television personality Tom Bergeron. The award ceremony, presented by the International Academy of Television Arts and Sciences (IATAS), honors all programming produced and originally aired outside the United States.

== Ceremony ==
The nominees for the 29th International Emmy Awards were announced by International Academy of Television Arts and Sciences, on October 8, 2001, at a press conference at MIPCOM in Cannes. United Kingdom won four of the six categories that competed at the International Emmys. The Channel 4 took the Emmy award in the popular arts category for his So Graham Norton series. ITV's Dirty Tricks, starring Martin Clunes, won best drama, while the arts documentary award went to Channel 4's The Miles Davis Story.

A filmed version of the Andrew Lloyd Webber musical, Jesus Christ Superstar, whose cast featured Rik Mayall, was the winner in the performing arts section. The other two trophies — children and young people, and documentary — went to Canada for CBC’s Street Cents and the Netherlands for KRO’s North Korea, respectively.

== Winners ==
Best Drama Series	Best Popular Arts Program
Dirty Tricks - United Kingdom (Carlton TV); Fatou la Malienne - France (France 2); Anniversaries - Germany (ARD); Cold Feet - United Kingdom (ITV)	So Graham Norton - United Kingdom (Channel 4); Spaced - United Kingdom (Channel 4); Was guckst du?! - Germany (ZDF); Miss Hong Kong Pageant 2000 - Hong Kong (TVB Jade)
Best Documentary	Best Arts Documentary
Welcome to North Korea - Netherlands (KRO); For my Baby - Japan (Mainichi Broadcasting System); Golda's List - France (France 3); Challenger: Go for Launch - United Kingdom (BBC)	The Miles Davis Story - United Kingdom (Channel 4); Ravel's Brain - Canada (Bravo Canada); Bunraku - Japan (NHK); Buscando América: Ruben Blades - Mexico (People & Arts Latino)
Best Performing Arts Program	Best Children & Young People Program
Great Performances: Jesus Christ Superstar - United Kingdom (KQED/Really Useful Films); Music from the Red Violin - Canada (Bravo Canada); Great Performances: Don Giovanni Unmasked - Canada (Bravo Canada); Yo-Yo Ma in Todai-ji - Japan (Mainichi Broadcasting System)	Street Cents - Canada (CBC Television); Star Golden Bell - South Korea (Korean Broadcasting System); Willem Wever - Netherlands (NCRV); Küss mich - Germany (ZDF)
