= Eliot Higgins =

British citizen journalist

Eliot Ward Higgins
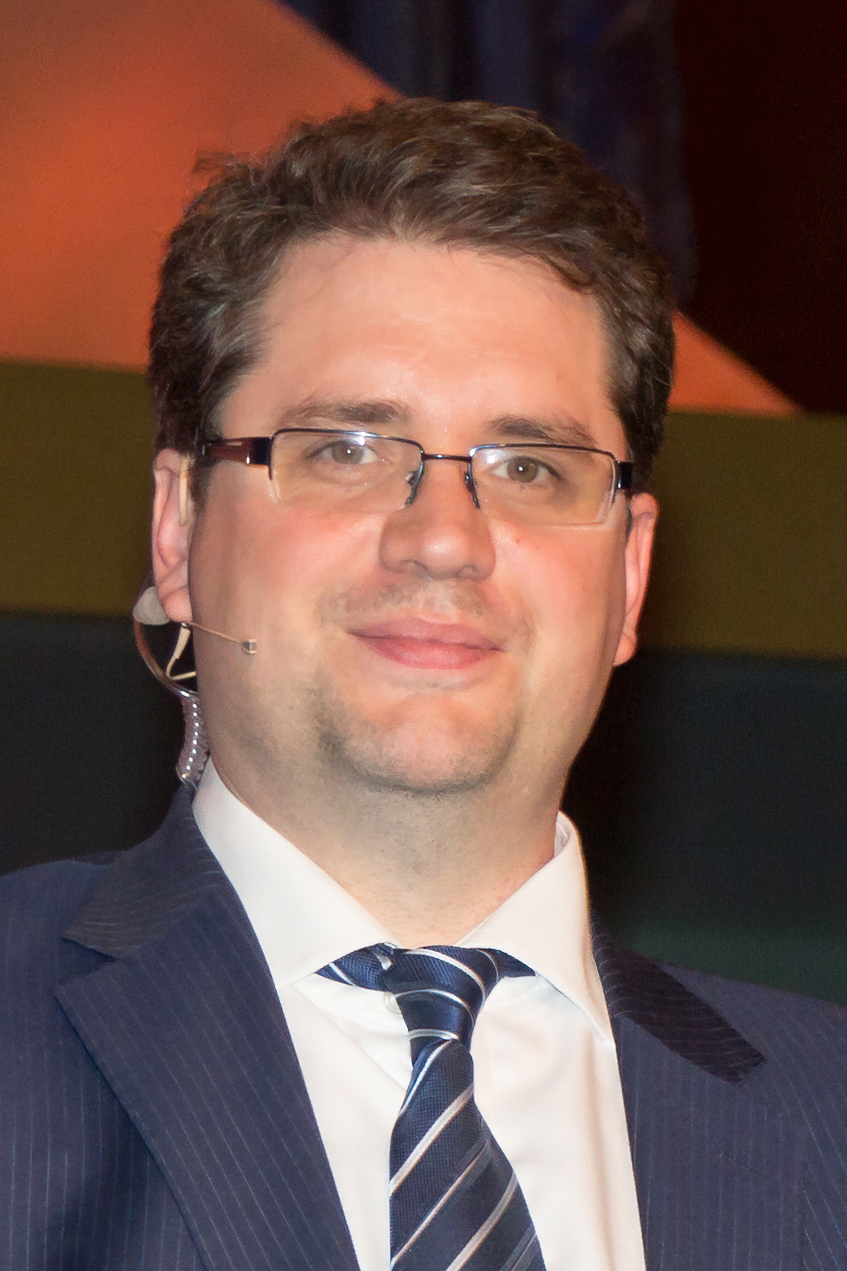
- Higgins in 2015
- Born: Eliot Ward Higgins; January 1979 (age 47); Shrewsbury, Shropshire, England
- Occupations: Blogger; weapons analyst; citizen journalist
- Known for: Analysis on: Syrian Civil War; downing of MH17; Russo-Ukrainian War
- Notable work: We Are Bellingcat

Eliot Ward Higgins (born January 1979), who previously wrote under the pseudonym Brown Moses, is a British citizen journalist and former blogger, known for using open sources and social media for investigations. He is the founder of Bellingcat, an investigative journalism website that specialises in fact-checking and open-source intelligence. He has investigated incidents including the Syrian Civil War, the Russo-Ukrainian War, the downing of Malaysia Airlines Flight 17 and the poisoning of Sergei and Yulia Skripal. He first gained mainstream media attention by identifying weapons in uploaded videos from the Syrian conflict.

== Life and work ==
Higgins was born in Shrewsbury, England, in January 1979. A high-school dropout, he attended Haberdashers' Adams Grammar School in Shropshire from 1990 to 1995.

He previously worked in finance and administration. In 2012, when Higgins began blogging about the Syrian civil war, he was unemployed and spent his days taking care of his child at home; his wife is Turkish. Higgins took the pseudonym Brown Moses from the Frank Zappa song "Brown Moses" on the album Thing-Fish.

Higgins's analyses of Syrian weapons, which began as a hobby out of his home in his spare time, are frequently cited by the press and human rights groups and have led to parliamentary discussion. His Brown Moses Blog began in March 2012 by covering the Syrian conflict. Higgins operates by monitoring over 450 YouTube channels daily looking for images of weapons and tracking when new types appear in the war, where, and with whom. According to reporter for The Guardian Matthew Weaver, Higgins has been "hailed as something of a pioneer" for his work. Higgins has no background or training in weapons and is entirely self-taught, saying that "Before the Arab spring I knew no more about weapons than the average Xbox owner. I had no knowledge beyond what I'd learned from Arnold Schwarzenegger and Rambo."

Higgins began reporting on the use of improvised barrel bombs by the Syrian government in 2012, around the time their use was first reported.

Other aspects of the Syrian conflict uncovered and documented by Higgins include the use of cluster bombs in 2012, which the Syrian government denied using; the proliferation of shoulder-launched heat-seeking missiles known as MANPADS; and the proliferation of Croatian-made weapons which was reportedly connected to the United States, a story later picked up by The New York Times. He has also investigated the Syrian regime's alleged use of chemical weapons, including the Ghouta chemical attack in detail. Higgins has also performed contract work for Human Rights Watch and Action on Armed Violence. Higgins's work on who was responsible for the sarin gas attacks in the Syrian civil war was criticised in a letter to the London Review of Books by Theodore Postol of the Massachusetts Institute of Technology and missile expert and former UN weapons inspector, Richard Lloyd.

Higgins used geolocation to publish an estimate of where the James Foley execution video was made outside Raqqa, an Islamic State stronghold in north-central Syria. Higgins used visual markers in stills from the video and his interpretation of satellite images of the terrain around Raqqa.

From 2016 until early 2019, Higgins was a senior fellow in the Atlantic Council's Digital Forensic Research Lab and Future Europe Initiative projects. In 2018 Higgins was a visiting research associate at the Centre for Science and Security Studies (CSSS) at the Department of War Studies at King's College London and visiting research fellow at University of California Berkeley's Human Rights Center. In October of that year, Higgins was the subject of BBC Radio Four's programme Profile.

== Bellingcat ==
On 15 July 2014, Higgins began a new website called Bellingcat for citizen journalists to investigate current events using open-source information such as videos, maps and pictures. Its launch was funded by a Kickstarter campaign. In the year after its establishment, Bellingcat's self-taught open-source analysts included Higgins and eight volunteers. By 2021, the organisation had 25 staff.

Among its major projects, Bellingcat has investigated the downing of Malaysia Airlines Flight 17 in Ukraine. Its work is being considered by the Dutch police investigating the crash, and Higgins has been interviewed twice by the investigators. Bellingcat has suggested that the anti-aircraft missile that hit the plane was fired by a Russian unit, the 53rd Buk brigade, based in the city of Kursk. On 31 May 2015, Bellingcat released a report alleging among other things photo manipulation of satellite images released by the Russian Ministry of Defense. The photos concerned the location of Ukrainian Buk missile launchers around the time MH17 was shot down. Bellingcat's use of error level analysis in its report was criticised by Jens Kriese, a professional image analyst. Bellingcat's findings about which field the missile was fired from were vindicated in September 2016 by the Dutch-led MH17 Joint Investigation Team.

In 2023, Higgins published an image on social media of former President Trump in jail in a jumpsuit, generated by AI. As a result of this, he was banned from Midjourney, which he used to create the image.

== Publications ==
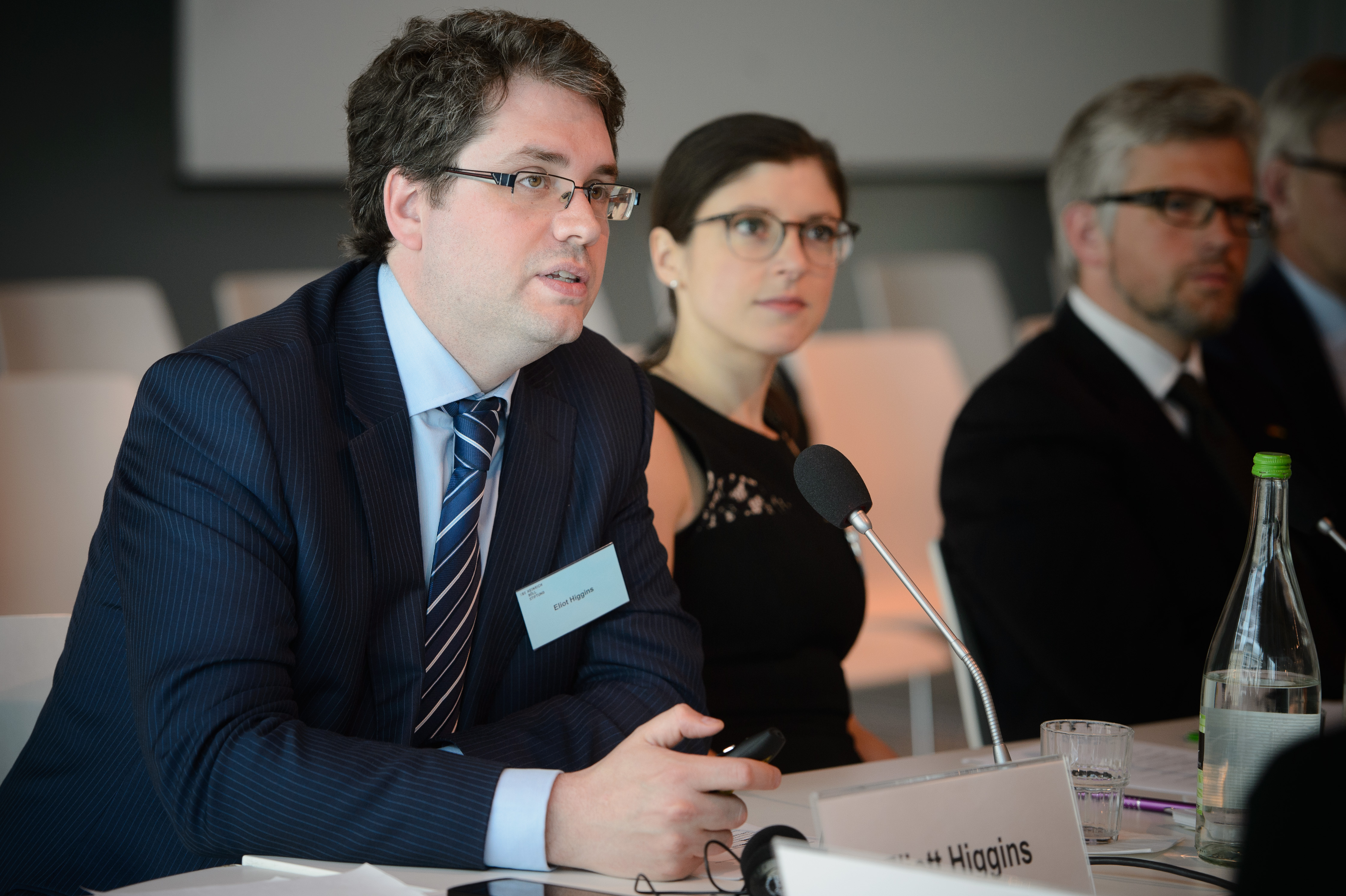
Eliot Higgins and Alina Polyakova, (Note: Atlantic Council Associate Director) presenting (Note: At the "Russian Disinformation in the 21st Century" Conference, Berlin, 2015.) the "Hiding in Plain Sight" report; Andrij Melnyk, (Note: Ukraine's Ambassador to Germany)

In 2015, Higgins was one of five co-authors of the report Hiding in Plain Sight: Putin's War in Ukraine published by the Atlantic Council, which examined direct Russian military involvement in Ukraine. Higgins together with a report co-author, Maks Czuperski from the Atlantic Council, presented Hiding in Plain Sight at the European Parliament alongside Russian opposition figure Ilya Yashin and former Russian Prime Minister Mikhail Kasyanov.

Higgins was also one of five authors of an Atlantic Council report released in 2016, Distract, Deceive, Destroy, on Russia's role in Syria.

Higgins's 2021 book We Are Bellingcat documents the rise of citizen investigative journalism and Bellingcat. It was The Times' and The Week's book of the week in February 2021.

== Reception ==
Higgins has received significant praise and support from human rights groups, journalists, and non-profit organisations. In 2013, Peter Bouckaert, emergencies director at Human Rights Watch said "Brown Moses is among the best out there when it comes to weapons monitoring in Syria". The New York Times war reporter C.J. Chivers said, in 2013, that fellow journalists owe a debt to Higgins's investigative reporting in Syria. "Many people, whether they admit [it] or not, have been relying on that blog's daily labour to cull the uncountable videos that circulate from the conflict," he said. Amnesty International said, in 2013, that the Brown Moses Blog was vital in proving the Syrian government was using ballistic missiles, information then used to send a research mission to Syria.

Higgins has been a subject of interest for the British and US media. In 2015, he was described as "one of the world's foremost citizen journalists" by News Limited reporter Victoria Craw. He has been profiled in print by The Guardian, The Independent, The Huffington Post, and The New Yorker. Television features have been run by Channel 4 News and CNN International. He has also been covered by non-English sources.

A 2015 Hanns Joachim Friedrichs Award (Sonderpreis) for excellence in journalism was awarded to Higgins and bellingcat. In 2019, he was one of Foreign Policy magazine's Global Thinkers. In 2021, he was named one of the 28 most influential people in Europe, in the "Disrupters" category, by Politico Europe. In 2025, he was awarded an honorary doctorate by Leiden University "for his contributions to the use of open source intelligence – gathering and analysing information from publicly available sources – to guarantee historical accuracy and fair judicial process: data that can also be used as evidence in international criminal cases".

== Bibliography ==
- Higgins, Eliot (19 July 2013). "How I Accidentally Became an Expert on the Syrian Conflict". Sabotage Times. Archived from the original on 23 July 2013.
- Maksymilian Czuperski; John Herbst; Eliot Higgins; Alina Polyakova; Damon Wilson (15 October 2015). "Hiding in plain sight: Putin's war in Ukraine". Atlantic Council.
- Higgins, Eliot (26 January 2016). "Piecing together open source evidence from the Syrian Sarin attacks". First Draft News – via Medium.com.
- Higgins, Eliot (2021). We Are Bellingcat: An Intelligence Agency for the People. London: Bloomsbury. ISBN 978-1-5266-1575-6. Archived from the original on 1 February 2021.
