= Bruce L. Paisner =

American Media Executive

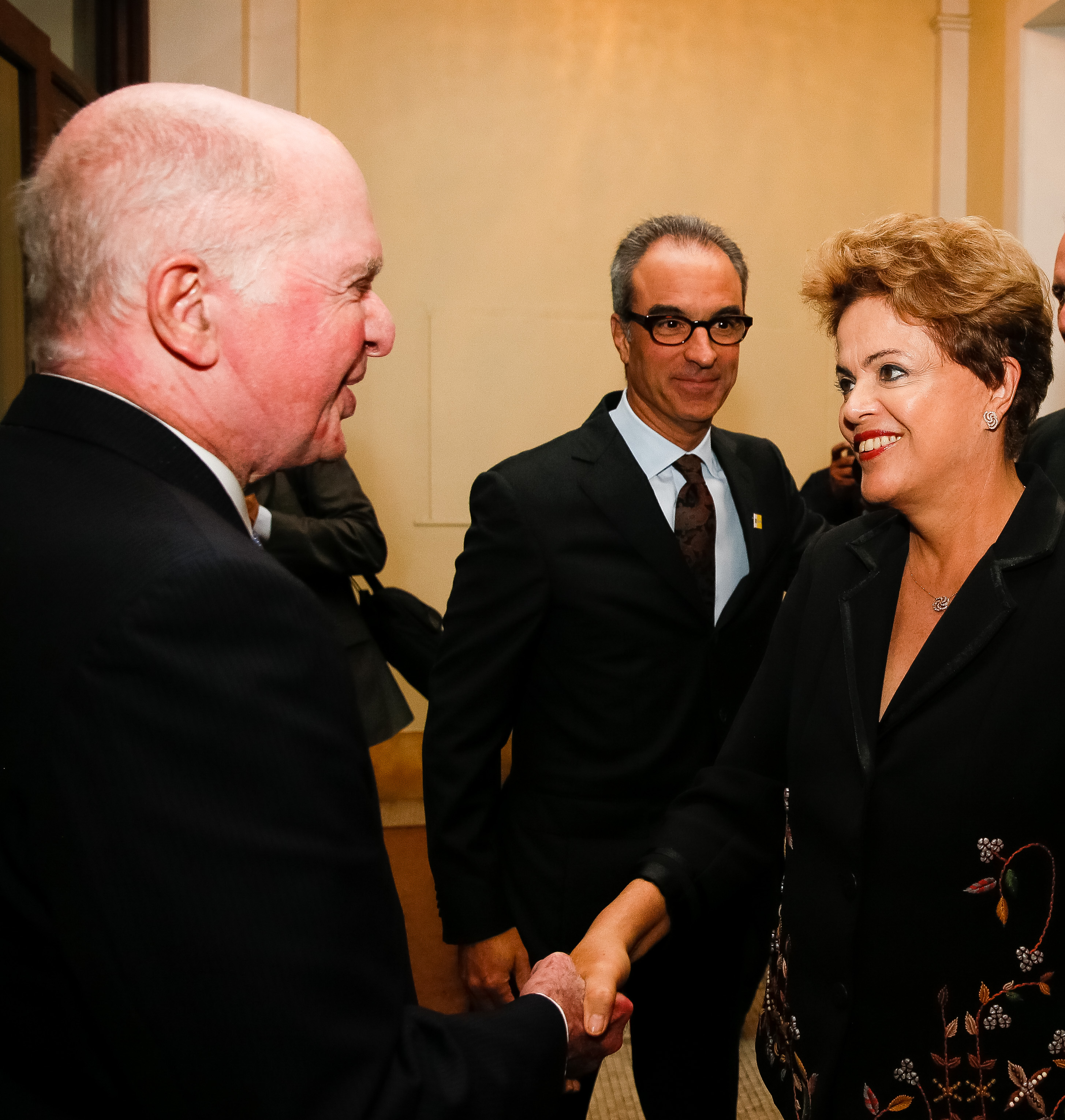
- Paisner and Dilma Rousseff in 2015
- Born: Bruce Lawrence Paisner; July 4, 1942; Providence, Rhode Island, U.S.
- Education: Harvard College
- Occupations: Television Executive President & CEO of the IATAS Senior Advisor, Hearst
- Years active: 1964-present
- Spouse: Nicole Paisner (after 1971)
- Children: 2

Bruce Lawrence Paisner (born July 4, 1942) is an American television executive and current President & CEO of the International Academy of Television Arts and Sciences since 2004. He was also President of Hearst Entertainment, Inc. and Vice President of Hearst Communications. He is currently a senior advisor to Hearst.

== Career ==
Paisner was an alumnus of Harvard College in 1964 and Harvard Law School in 1968. At Harvard college, he was managing editor of The Harvard Crimson, where he was a writer from 1961 to 1964. He began a career in media as a correspondent for Life magazine in New York and Washington, D.C. in 1964–1965. After law school, he rejoined Time Inc. in 1968 where in 1970, he became general manager of Time-Life Video and from 1973 to 1980, he was president and CEO of Time-Life Films, Inc. and a vice president of Time Incorporated. In 1981, he joined Hearst after Novacom, a distribution entity Paisner formed with WGBH-TV, the Boston affiliate of PBS, was acquired by the mass media company that year. Novacom was promptly reformed into King Features Entertainment (eventually being renamed Hearst Entertainment in 1990 after a corporate resurrecting that unified King Phoenix Entertainment, which Hearst acquired from founder Gerald W. Abrams in 1989, under one identity), where Paisner continued his duties of serving as the company's president.

He is a member of the University Club, the Century Association, and the Council on Foreign Relations.
