= Life Goes On (news article) =

Russian newspaper article

"Life Goes On" (Russian: «Жизнь продолжается») is an article published in the 3 September 2008 weekly issue of the Russian Ministry of Defence's official newspaper, Krasnaya Zvezda. It was also posted on the newspaper's web site. The article was based on the interview of a wounded officer who had taken part in the Russian military operation in South Ossetia in August 2008. Some days afterwards, the article was pulled from the newspaper's web site, the disappearance having been commented upon by the mainstream media, including The New York Times. After the initial publication, it was picked up by blogs and internet news agencies, as the first published version contradicted the official timeline of Russian incursion into South Ossetia. However, the article was later corrected.

The article was written by Irina Zhirnova (Ирина Жирнова) and details the war experience of a Russian Army 135th motor regiment commander named Denis Sidristy (Денис Сидристый).

== Correction ==
When asked about the article, a spokesman for the Russian Defense Ministry told Der Spiegel that it was the result of a technical error. Moreover, the spokesman said, the official in question had been wounded and therefore "could no longer remember the situation clearly."

After a query by The New York Times about the article, Krasnaya Zvezda later published an article in which Captain Sidristy said the correct date for the advance to Tskhinvali was August 8, not August 7.

== Excerpt ==
Presently, there is no known complete English translation of the article. Following is an excerpt from the second paragraph of the article:

"We were on exercises," Captain Sidristy begins. "It was quite a short distance from the South Ossetian capital. Nizhnii Zaramakh, a North Ossetian nature reserve. We were stationed at our camp after planned exercises, but on the night of August 7 we got the order to move towards Tskhinvali. We were woken by the alarm signal - and told to march. We arrived, took up our location, and already on the morning of August 8th the fire came down with such force that many even lost their bearings. No, everyone understood that Georgia had been preparing something, but it was hard to even imagine what we saw. Immediately after midnight, a massive shelling of the city and peacekeeping positions was started. They hit it from all types of weapons, including artillery rocket systems."
