= Henrikas Juškevičius =

Lithuanian journalist (born 1935)

Henrikas Juškevičius (born 1935) is a Lithuanian electrical engineer and journalist, former Assistant Director-General of UNESCO for Communication, Information and Informatics, and Advisor to the UNESCO Director-General on communication and administration issues.

== Biography ==
Juškevičius was born in Šiauliai, Lithuania, and graduated from the Leningrad Electrotechnical Communication Institute with a degree in radiocommunications and broadcast engineering. He worked at the Lithuanian Television Centre from 1958 to 1960, and was head of the technological department of Lithuanian television and radio from 1960 to 1966. In this capacity, he led the development of Lithuanian television and radio infrastructure. He joined the Union of Journalists in 1966.

In 1966, he was designated the director of the Technical Centre at the International Radio and Television Organization (OIRT – Intervision), headquartered in Prague, a position he held until 1971. During this time, he helped develop television news exchanges between Intervision and Eurovision. In 1968, he became a member of the Eurovision and Intervision Operations Group and a member of the Television Commission of the International Olympic Committee; for the latter work, he was awarded the Silver Order of the International Olympic Committee.

During the 1970s and 1980s, Juškevičius served as Vice-Chairman of the USSR State Committee for Television and Radio Broadcasting, as chairman of the Interministerial Committee for Radio and Television Development and as a member of the Interministerial Committee for Satellite Communication. In this capacity, in particular, he played a decisive role in introduction of colour television in the Soviet Union.

In September 1990 he joined UNESCO as Assistant Director-General for Communication, Information and Informatics, playing a leading role in the implementation of UNESCO's new communication strategy in the interest of freedom of the press and strengthening the communication capacities of developing countries. In 2000, he led the implementation of the UNESCO Director-General's reforms, overseeing the restructuring of the Secretariat, and later served as Advisor to the Director-General on communication and administration issues.

Juškevičius is a member of the International Academy of Electrotechnical Sciences, the Russian Academy of Information, the Society of Motion Picture and Television Engineers, and the International Institute of Communications, the vice-president of the Eurasian Academy of Television and Radio, and the vice-president of the Baden-Baden Foundation. He has been awarded with a Doctorate Honoris Causa by the Canadian International Institute for Advanced Studies in Systems Research and Cybernetics.
