= Norm Brunet =

- Born: February 13, 1958 (age 67); Quebec, Canada
- Origin: Ottawa, Ontario, Canada
- Genres: Country
- Occupation: Singer-songwriter
- Instrument: Guitar
- Years active: 1993–present
- Labels: BruneTunes Music & Publishing
- Website: www.normbrunet.com

Norm Brunet (born February 13, 1958) is a Canadian singer-songwriter and instrumentalist.

== Early life ==
Brunet was born on February 13, 1958, in the province of Quebec. He grew up and still lives in Ottawa, Ontario, and started playing guitar at the age of nine years old and wrote his first song at fifteen.

== Career ==
With the release of Reflections in late 2019, it includes both original material as well as Nashville Tunesmiths songs.

Brunet's 2017 album, It Don't Get Better Than This, is a mix of traditional country music, country rock, and Americana.

Brunet writes songs regularly and has performed hundreds of shows a year.

He names the Eagles, Poco, Loggins and Messina, and the Birds as some of his musical influences.

== Discography ==
=== Albums ===
- Reflections (2019)
- It Don't Get Better Than This (2017)
- Life Goes On (2002)
- Me and My Guitar (1993)

=== Singles ===
Year	Single	Peak positions	Album
Year	Single	CAN Country	Album
		CICC	
2023	So Long		So Long
2019	She Makes Me Look Good	59 CICC)	Reflections
2019	She Makes It Hard To Walk Away		Reflections
2019	All Of The time	14 (CICC)	Reflections
2019	Let Me In	15 (CICC)	Reflections
2017	"It Don't Get Better Than This"		It Don't Get Better Than This
2018	Pour Me Another One		It Don't Get Better Than This
2018	Can't Stop Thinking		It Don't Get Better Than This
2018	Good times &Tan Lines	4 (CICC)	It Don't Get Better Than This
2002	"Life Goes On"	43	Life Goes On
2002	"I Need Your Love"	36	Life Goes On
1992	"I'll Sing You a Song"	62	Me and My Guitar
1992	"Three Room Mansion"	63	Me and My Guitar
1992	"Take Care of My Heart"	77	Me and My Guitar
