= 18th International Emmy Awards =

1990 awards ceremony

- Date: November 19, 1990
- Location: Sheraton New York Times Square Hotel; New York City

The 18th International Emmy Awards took place on November 19, 1990, in New York City. The award ceremony, presented by the International Academy of Television Arts and Sciences (IATAS), honors all programming produced and originally aired outside the United States.

== Ceremony ==
The International Emmy Awards are presented annually by the International Academy of Television Arts and Sciences (IATAS). In addition to the programming categories, the International Academy awards world television personalities with the Directorate Award and the Founder Award, presented to Henrikas Yushkiavitshus and Joan Ganz Cooney, respectively.

== Winners ==
=== Best Arts Documentary ===
- Bookmark: From Moscow to Pietushki (United Kingdom: BBC)

=== Best Children & Young People ===
- Living with Dinosaurs (United Kingdom: Channel 4)

=== Best Documentary ===
- J'ai Douze Ans et Je Fais la Guerre (France: Capa/Canal+/France 3)

=== Best Drama ===
- First and Last (United Kingdom: BBC)

=== Best Performing Arts ===
- The Mahabharata (United Kingdom: Channel 4)

=== Best Popular Arts ===
- Norbert Smith: A Life (United Kingdom: Channel 4)

== See also ==
- List of International Emmy Award winners
