= 20th International Emmy Awards =

1992 awards ceremony

- Location: Sheraton New York Times Square Hotel; New York City
- Hosted by: Louis Gossett Jr. María Conchita Alonso

Television/radio coverage
- Network: PBS
- Produced by: Joe Cates

The 20th International Emmy Awards took place on November 23, 1992 in New York City. The award ceremony, presented by the International Academy of Television Arts and Sciences (IATAS), honors all programming produced and originally aired outside the United States.

== Ceremony ==
The nominees for the 20th International Emmy Awards were selected by an international panel of television industry judges. More than 250 programs were written for the awards. The United Kingdom received eight nominations, a number considered low compared to previous editions, followed by Canada with seven mentions. The winners were announced on November 23, 1992, at the Sheraton New York Times Square Hotel. The International Academy awarded the Directorate Award to the Italian Silvio Berlusconi and to Bill Cosby the Founders Award.

== Broadcast ==
The ceremony was produced by Joe Cates, and broadcast for more than 20 countries. In the PBS network was aired a one-hour version displayed on November 29, 1992.

== Winners ==
Best Drama Series	Best Popular Arts Program
A Dangerous Man: Lawrence After Arabia - United Kingdom (Enigma TV/Angelika Films/Sands Films/WNET); Brides of Christ - Australia (ABC); A Sense of History - United Kingdom (Channel 4)	Drop the Dead Donkey - United Kingdom (Channel 4); The Inquisitor - United Kingdom (Grant Naylor Prods.); Brian Orser: Night Moves - Canada (CBC)
Best Documentary	Best Arts Documentary
To Sell a War - Canada (CBC); Inside Story: The Nightrider - United Kingdom (BBC); Kwai - France (France 2)	José Carreras: A Life Story - United Kingdom (Iambic Productions); Arena: The Incredible Case of Comrade Rockstar - United Kingdom (BBC); Threads of Hope - Canada (Canamedia Prods.)
Best Performing Arts Program	Best Children & Young People Program
Pictures On The Edge - Canada (CBC); Canadian Brass: Home Movies - Canada (CBC); Na Floresta - Canada (Société Radio-Canada)	Beat That: Hairdressing - United Kingdom (Channel 4); Sorrow: The Nazi Legacy - Sweden (Lidingo Filmpoint Sweden); Alligator Pie - Canada (CBC)
