= Bellingcat: Truth in a Post-Truth World =

2018 documentary film directed by Carlos Oteyza

- Release poster
- Directed by: Hans Pool
- Produced by: Femke Wolting; Bruno Wille Felix
- Edited by: Simon Barker
- Distributed by: Submarine Amsterdam
- Release date: November 16, 2018 (IDFA)
- Running time: 88 minutes
- Country: Netherlands
- Languages: English, German, Dutch, Russian, Arabic

Bellingcat: Truth in a Post-Truth World is a 2018 documentary film that explores the investigative journalism work published of Bellingcat, including the Skripal poisoning and the crash of Malaysia Airlines Flight 17.

The film has been screened both in the International Documentary Filmfestival Amsterdam in 2018 and in the Human Rights Watch Film Festival in 2019.

The film won the RTBF award at the festival des Liberétes 2019. In November 2019, it won an International Emmy Award in the documentary category.

== See also ==
- We Are Bellingcat: Global Crime, Online Sleuths, and the Bold Future of News, 2021 book

== Literature ==
- Christiane Amanpour (June 12, 2019). "How Bellingcat finds truth in a post truth world". Amanpour. CNN. "Bellingcat - Truth in a Post-Truth World," a New Documentary; Bellingcat Investigates Downing of MH17;.
- "Syria, Skripal and MH17: how Bellingcat Broke the News". The Guardian. March 12, 2019.
