= 14th International Emmy Awards =

1986 awards ceremony

- Date: November 24, 1986
- Location: New York Hilton Midtown Hotel, New York City

The 14th International Emmy Awards took place on November 24, 1986 in New York City. The award ceremony, presented by the International Academy of Television Arts and Sciences (IATAS), honors all programming produced and originally aired outside the United States.

== Ceremony ==
The winners of the 1985 International Emmys were announced at a ceremony presented by the International Academy of Television Arts and Sciences (IATAS). There were 159 programs registered in the competition, covering 24 countries, a number very close to last year's record number of registrations. For the second year in a row, ITV's British satirical series Spitting Image won an Emmy in the popular art category. The telefilm Shadowlands, a BBC co-production with Gateway Films and the Episcopal Radio-TV Foundation won best drama. Channel 4's Chasing a Rainbow: The Life of Josephine Baker won an award as the best documentary.

The Emmy for best performing arts was given to Bejart's Kabuki Ballet from Japan's public broadcaster NHK. The Kids of Degrassi Street series produced by Playuing with Time Inc. in association with the Canadian network CBC won best children's program category. Herbert Schmertz, vice president of Mobil Oil Corp., received the Directorate Award, and Donald L. Taffner, president of D. L. Taffner Ltd. of New York, received the Founders Award.

== Winners ==
=== Best Children & Young People ===
- The Kids of Degrassi Street: Griff Gets a Hand (Canada: CBC Television)

=== Best Documentary ===
- Chasing a Rainbow: The Life of Josephine Baker (United Kingdom: Channel 4)

=== Best Drama ===
- Shadowlands (United Kingdom: BBC)

=== Best Performing Arts ===
- Bejart's Kabuki Ballet (Japan: NHK)

=== Best Popular Arts Program ===
- Spitting Image (United Kingdom: ITV)
