= Capo (surname) =

Capo is a surname. Notable people with the surname include:

- Anthony Capo (1959/1960–2012), Italian-American mobster
- Fran Capo (born 1959), motivational speaker, radio host, adventurer, comedian, voice-over artist, and writer
- Rene Capo (1961–2009), Cuban-American judoka

== See also ==
- Caro (surname)
