= Heart of the Dragon (British TV series) =

- Directed by: David Kennard
- Starring: Anthony Quayle
- Country of origin: England
- Original language: English
- No. of seasons: 1
- No. of episodes: 12

Production
- Executive producers: Alasdair Clayre; Peter Montagnon; Nigel Houghton
- Running time: 57 minutes
- Production company: Channel 4 Television Corporation

Original release
- Network: Channel 4

Heart of the Dragon is a 1984 British documentary television series directed by David Kennard. It covered life in China, with 12 one hour episodes, each on a different aspect of Chinese life. It was first aired in England on Channel 4, and in the United States by PBS. The 12-episode series won several international awards, including an Emmy.

== Awards ==
Year	Award	Category	Result
1984	12th International Emmy Awards	Best Documentary	Won
1985	Primetime Emmy Award	Outstanding Informational Series	Nominated
1985	BAFTA Awards	Best Factual Series	Nominated
1985	BAFTA Awards	Best Editing	Nominated
