= Aurora Kapo =

Albanian singer (born 2000)

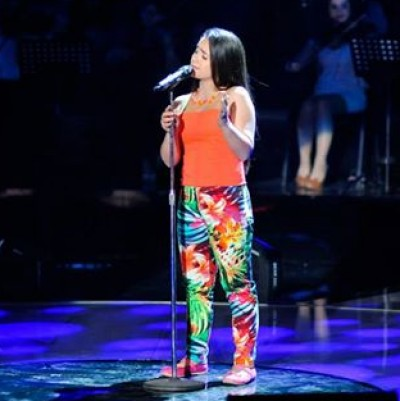

Background information
- Born: Aurora Kapo; 17 November 2000 (age 25); Rovigo, Italy
- Genres: Pop; dance-pop; R&B; EDM
- Occupations: Singer; songwriter
- Years active: 2008–present

Aurora Kapo (born 17 November 2000) is an Albanian singer. Kapo has represented Albania in international singing competitions.

== Early life ==
She started her career at age 6. Kapo took place in the largest Albanian kids talent show called "Gjeniu i Vogel" on the Albanian channel "Tv Klan". Kapo went to the "Gjeniu i Vogel" Finals and won the most popular participant and also the most viewed and liked participant on Facebook and YouTube.

== Career ==
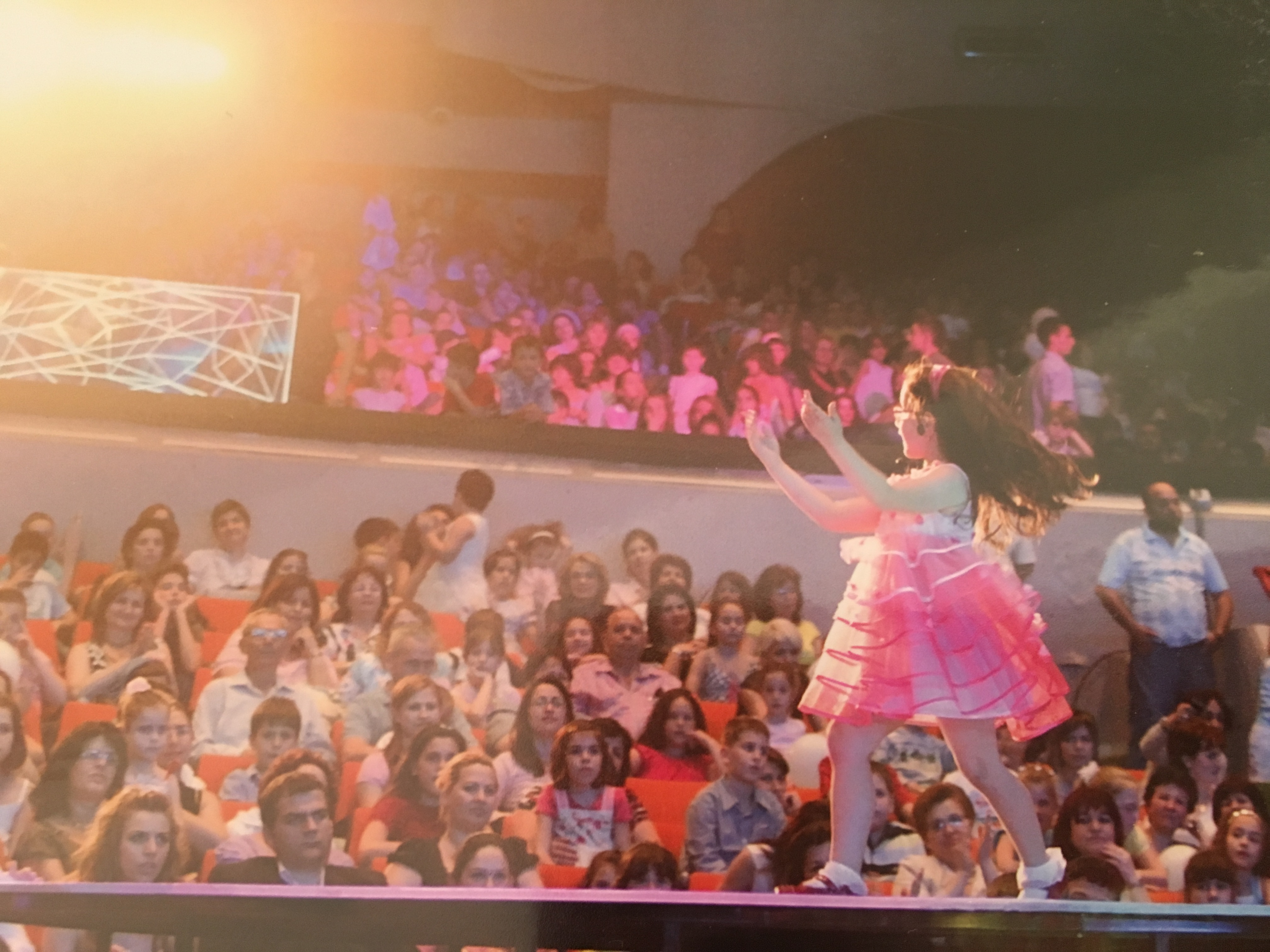

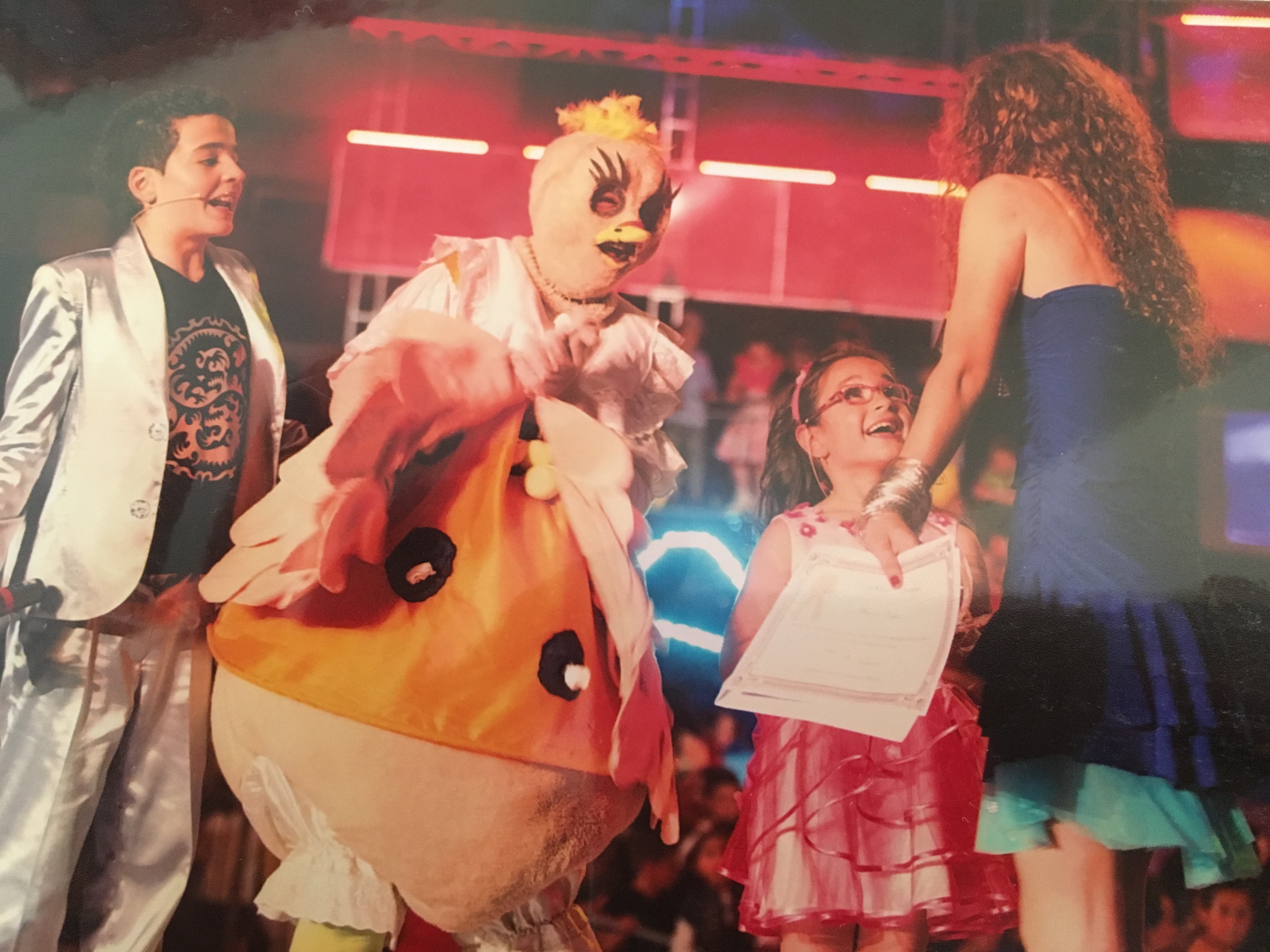

Kapo began her career in Durrës, Albania, where she was raised. In 2008 she was selected to represent Albania in the Rožaje Zlatna pahulja festival, a competition involving more than 25 countries. She was the first Albanian to win first place. Kapo continued singing in other competitions such as Kripemjaltezat in 2009, where she won Best Interpreter. She competed at the Perform-Fest 2009 competition, winning first place. She represented Albania in the Macedonian Festival. She also represented Italy in the IFLC (International Festival of Language and Culture) with the song "Felicita".. In 2012 she tried to represent Albania in Junior Eurovision Song Contest 2012 with the song: "Blue Jeans", but she didn't win.

=== Bala Türkvizyon 2015 ===
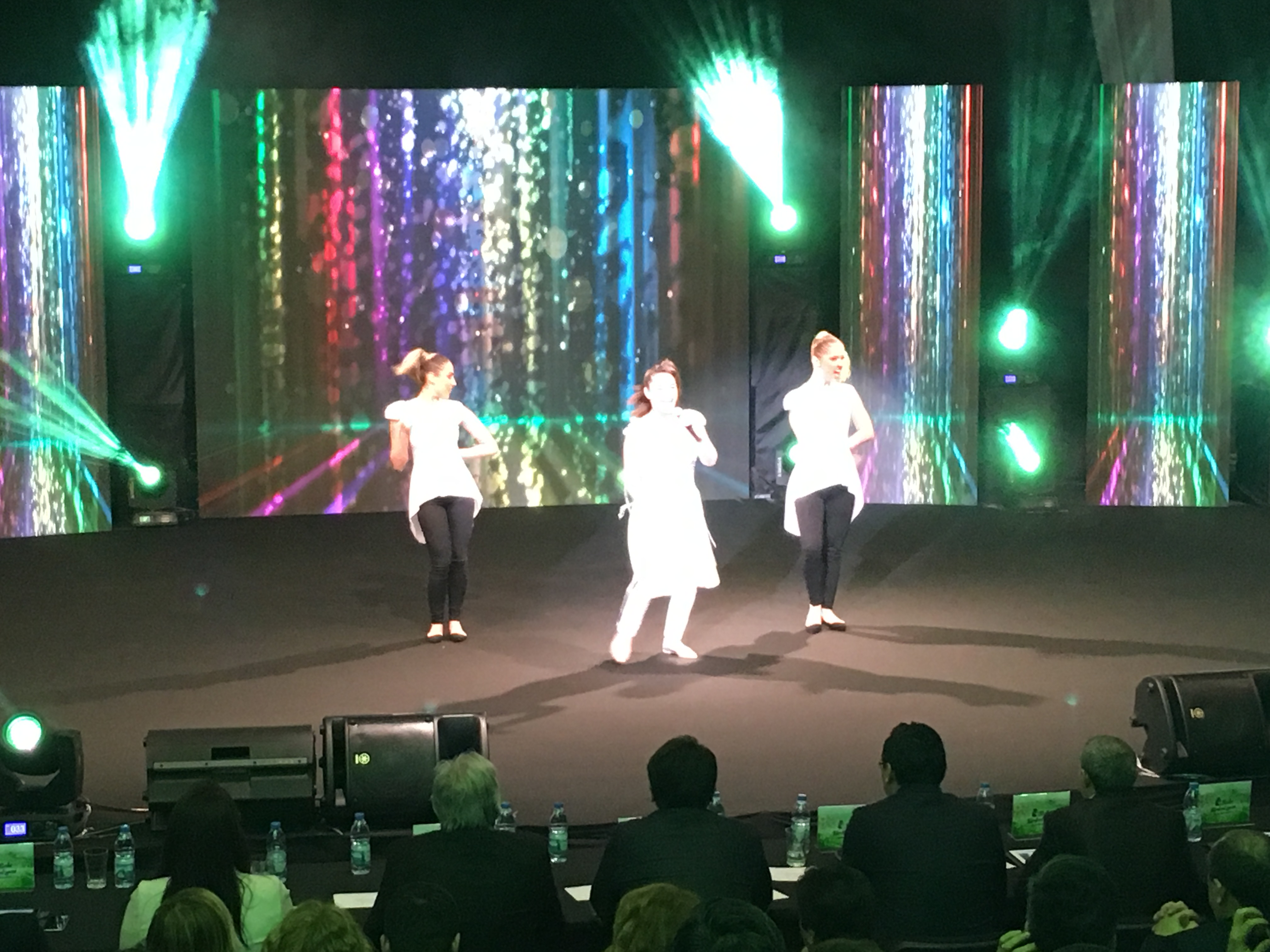

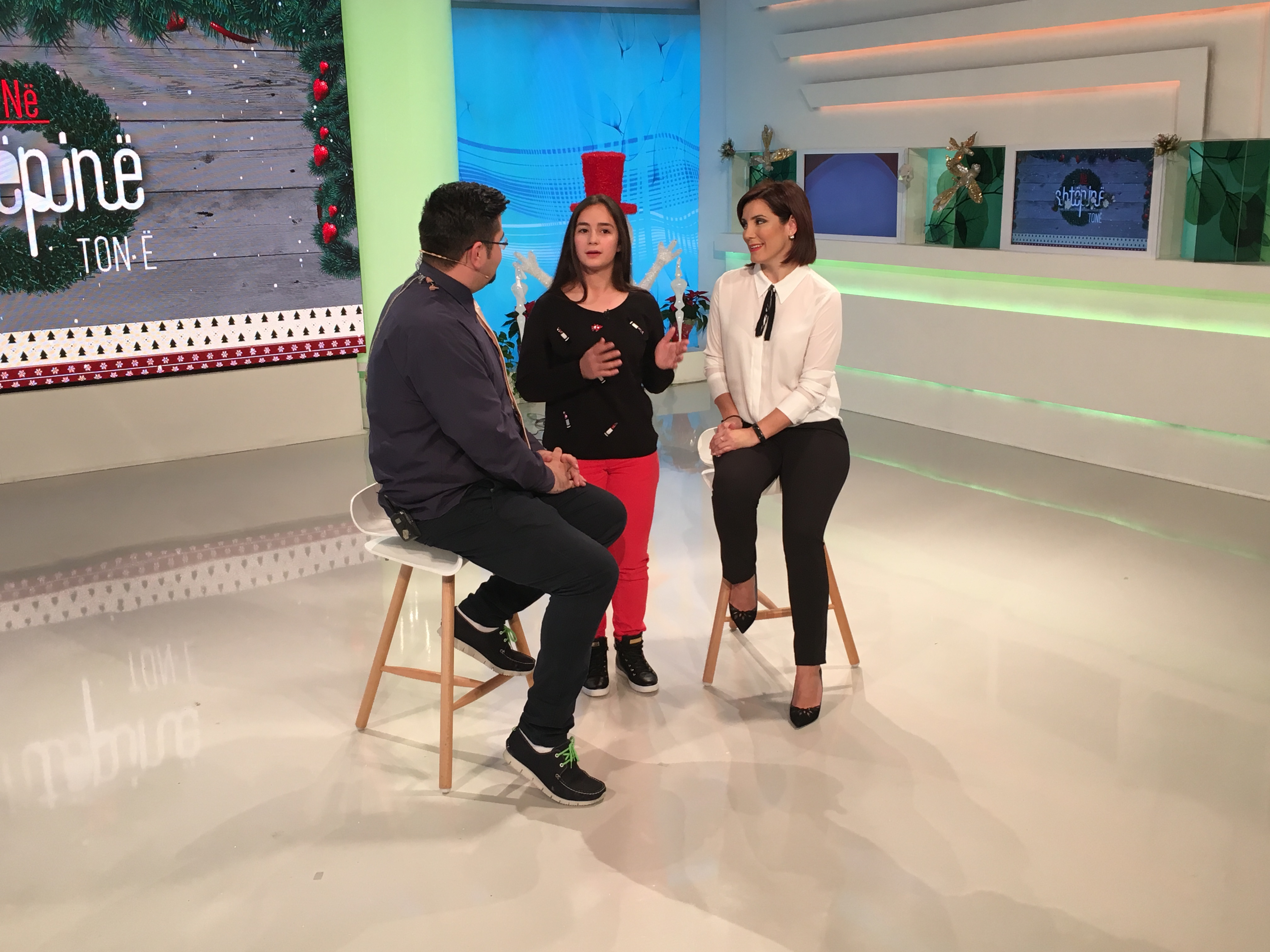

Kapo was selected to represent Albania in Bala Türkvizyon Song Contest 2015, in Turkey. She sang "Kercej Me Yjet" which is Albanian for "Dancing with the Stars" and is "Yildizlarla Dans" in Turkish. Thirteen countries competed and Albania achieved 7th place.

== Discography ==
Kapo has released two albums so far. She wrote and performed all of the songs on these albums. The albums are called Ditelindja e Diellit and I'm a Show Girl. Kapo's music is most popular among children.
