= Big Deal at Gothenburg =

1966 British TV documentary by Robert Tyrrell

- Directed by: Robert Tyrrell
- Starring: Brian Widlake
- Country of origin: United Kingdom
- Original language: English

Production
- Producer: Robert Tyrrell
- Production company: Tyne Tees TV

Original release
- Network: ITV
- Release: 7 September 1966

Big Deal at Gothenburg is a 1966 British documentary film directed by Robert Tyrrell for Tyne Tees TV.

== Awards ==
Year	Award	Category	Result
1967	International Emmy Awards	Best Documentary	Won
