= The Sword of Islam =

British documentary

- Directed by: David Darlow
- Produced by: Rod Caird
- Release date: 1987
- Country: United Kingdom
- Language: English

The Sword of Islam is a 1987 British documentary film directed by David Darlow and produced by Granada Television.

== Synopsis ==
The Sword of Islam explores the world of Muslim fundamentalists.

== Awards ==
Year	Award	Category	Result
1987	15th International Emmy Awards	Best documentary	Won
