= David Darlow (film producer) =

British film producer and director

David Walter Darlow (born January 1942) is a British film producer and director, who predominantly produced documentary films and series.

== Life ==
Darlow was active as a producer of documentary films and series since the 1970s. He worked for the BBC. In 1972 he planned to produce a documentary for the BBC about the vanishing of Royal Navy frogman Lionel Crabb. This led to a conflict with the British Ministry of Defence and ultimately the BBC abandoned the project. Darlow also directed some productions such as the documentary The Sword of Islam (1987) or the TV movie Coded Hostile (1989).

Together with John Smithson he co-founded the production company Darlow Smithson Productions in 1988. In June 2002 Smithson acquired full control and bought out Darlow's 50 % stake. A month later Darlow left the company.

In 2000 Darlow won a News & Documentary Emmy Award in the category Outstanding Background/Analysis of a Single Current Story – Programs for the episode Decoding Nazi Secrets of the documentary series Nova. In the previous year he was nominated for the same award in the category Outstanding Investigative Journalism – Programs for an episode of Survival in the Sky.

== Selected filmography ==
Producer

- 1979–1981: Panorama (documentary series, 7 episodes)
- 1982–1985: World in Action (documentary series, 13 episodes)
- 1992–1994: Everyman (documentary series, 4 episodes)
- 1998: Crash (documentary series, 3 episodes)
- 1996–1998: Survival in the Sky (documentary series, 6 episodes)
- 1999: Station X (documentary series, 4 episodes)
- 2004: Innovation: Life, Inspired (documentary series, 1 episode)
- 2005: Air Crash Investigation (documentary series, 8 episodes)

Executive Producer

- 1999: Nova (documentary series, 1 episode)
- 2000: Equinox (documentary series, 1 episode)
- 2001: Science and the Swastika (documentary series, 4 episodes)
- 2001: Going Critical (documentary series, 1 episode)
- 2002: Superstructures of America (documentary series, 2 episodes)
- 2002: Lost Worlds (documentary series, 1 episode)
- 2005: Air Crash Investigation (documentary series, 10 episodes)

Director

- 1987: The Sword of Islam (documentary film)
- 1989: Coded Hostile (also known as Tailspin: Behind the Korean Airliner Tragedy, TV movie)
- 1994: In Suspicious Circumstances (TV movie, 2 episodes)
- 1996: Survival in the Sky (documentary series, 3 episodes)
- 1998: Crash (documentary series, 3 episodes)
- 2004: Innovation: Life, Inspired (documentary series, 1 Episode)
