= 12th International Emmy Awards =

1984 awards ceremony

- Date: November 19, 1984
- Location: Sheraton New York Times Square Hotel, New York City
- Hosted by: Regis Philbin

The 12th Annual International Emmy Awards took place on November 19, 1984, in New York City and was hosted by Regis Philbin. The award ceremony, presented by the International Academy of Television Arts and Sciences(IATAS), honors all programming produced and originally aired outside the United States.

== Ceremony ==
The awards ceremony was presented by the International Academy of Television Arts and Sciences (IATAS), and was attended by 144 programs from 25 countries, excluding the United States. The drama award went to Granada Television for Jewel in the Crown, a story of the clash of English and Indian cultures in 1942. Britain's Channel Four Television won the documentary award for The Heart of the Dragon, a program about China's history. The performing arts award also went to Channel Four for The Tragedy of Carmen, based on Georges Bizet's opera.

Thames Television also won two awards - in the popular arts category, Fresh Fields, about a housewife preparing to begin a career outside the home, and in children's programs, Wind in the Willows, the adventures of four animals in the guise of Edwardian gentleman.

Filmmaker David L. Wolper won the Founder's Award. The Directorate Award went to Lord Bernstein, president of the Granada Group and founding executive of Granada Television.

== Winners ==
=== Best Children & Young People ===
- Wind in the Willows (Great Britain: Thames Television)

=== Best Documentary ===
- Heart of the Dragon (Great Britain: Channel Four Television)

=== Best Drama ===
- Jewel in the Crown (Great Britain: Granada Television)

=== Best Performing Arts ===
- The Tragedy of Carmen (Great Britain: Channel Four Television)

=== Best Popular Arts Program ===
- Fresh Fields (Great Britain: Thames Television)
