= Chasing a Rainbow: The Life of Josephine Baker =

1986 film directed by Christopher Ralling

- Directed by: Christopher Ralling
- Screenplay by: Neil Jordan; David Leland
- Produced by: Mick Csaky
- Narrated by: Todd Olivier
- Distributed by: Channel 4 Csaky Ltd.
- Release date: 1986
- Language: English

Chasing a Rainbow: The Life of Josephine Baker is a 1986 British documentary film directed by Christopher Ralling about singer and dancer Josephine Baker.

== Synopsis ==
Documentary on black American singer/dancer Josephine Baker (1906-1974), who emigrated to France where she was a major artist from 1927 until her death.

== Cast ==
- Josephine Baker ... Herself
- Jacqueline Cartier ... Herself
- Adelaide Hall ... Herself
- Todd Olivier ... Narrator
- Alain Weill ... Herself
