= Welcome to North Korea =

2001 film

Noord-Korea
- Directed by: Raymond Feddema; Peter Tetteroo
- Written by: Raúl Marchand Sánchez
- Starring: John Swieringa
- Distributed by: KRO Television
- Release date: 2001
- Running time: 50 minutes
- Country: Netherlands
- Languages: English; Korean

Welcome to North Korea (Dutch: Noord-Korea) is a 2001 Dutch pseudo-documentary film directed by Peter Tetteroo and Raymond Feddema for KRO Television. The film won an International Emmy in 2001 for best documentary.
