= Das Leben geht weiter =

- Directed by: Mark Cairns
- Written by: Hans-Christoph Blumenberg (book); Mark Cairns (screenplay)
- Starring: Dieter Moor; Hans Abich; Günther Anders
- Distributed by: StarCrest Media
- Release date: 22 October 2002
- Running time: 86 minutes
- Country: Germany

Das Leben geht weiter (also known as Life Goes On) is a 2002 German documentary film directed by Mark Cairns. It's based on the book by the same name written by Hans-Christoph Blumenberg, the film meticulously reconstructs the last months of the Third Reich.

== Synopsis ==
Autumn 1944 – The Third Reich is near to collapse and the first Allied soldiers are on German soil. Meanwhile, just outside Berlin, the cameras start rolling on one of the biggest propaganda films ever planned by the Nazis: Das Leben geht weiter – a film intended to show how the German people cope and retain their spirit through the destruction and horror of their everyday life, struggling through to the promised victory. The premiere for this film was planned for the end of June 1945, two months after the war was lost. This is the absurd and often tragic story behind the making of Das Leben geht weiter.

== Cast ==
- Dieter Moor ... Narrador
- Hans Abich ... Himself
- Günther Anders ... Himself (voice) (archive footage)
- Frank Brückner ... Soldado
- Joseph Goebbels ... Himself (as Josef Goebbels)
- Heinz Graue ... Himself
- Veit Harlan ... Himself (archive footage)
- Elisabeth Lennartz ... Himself (as Elisabeth Knuth-Lennartz)
- Wolfgang Liebeneiner ... Himself (archive footage)
- Gunnar Möller ... Himself
- Heinz Pehlke ... Himself
- Karl Ritter ... Himself (archive footage)
- Siegfried Wolter ... Himself

== Awards ==
| Year | Award | Category | Result |
|---|---|---|---|
| 2003 | 31st International Emmy Awards | Best Documentary | Won |

== See also ==
- Nazi Germany
