= 26th International Emmy Awards =

1998 awards ceremony

- Date: November 23, 1998
- Location: New York Hilton Midtown; New York City
- Hosted by: Hans Liberg

The 26th International Emmy Awards took place on November 23, 1998, in New York City and hosted by Dutch comedian Hans Liberg. The award ceremony, presented by the International Academy of Television Arts and Sciences (IATAS), honors all programming produced and originally aired outside the United States. Among the presenters were John Ritter, Alan Thicke, Linda Purl and Joanne Woodward.

== Winners ==
Best Arts Documentary	Best Children & Young People Program
The War Symphonies: Shostakovich Against Stalin - (Germany) (ZDF); Reputations - (United Kingdom) (BBC/A&E); Lorca: Centenary of a Poet - (Spain) (Canal Plus)	Blabbermouth & Stickybeak - (Australia) (Channel Four); Kids Can Do It! - (Japan) (NHK); Wise Up - (United Kingdom) (Carlton Prods.)
Best Documentary	Best Drama
Exile in Sarajevo - (Australia) (Exile Prods.); Futebol - (Brazil) (GNT); Endgame: The Untold Story of the Hostage Crisis in Peru - (Japan) (NHK)	The Tattooed Widow - (Sweden) (SVT); White Lies - (Canada) (CBC); Das Urteil - (Germany) (NDR)
Best Performing Arts	Best Popular Arts Program
The Judas Tree - (United Kingdom) (Channel Four); In the Cherry-Blossom Forest - (Japan) (NHK); Kinkakuji Sound Stage - (Japan) (MB)	The Vicar of Dibley - (United Kingdom) (BBC); Goodness Gracious Me - (United Kingdom) (BBC); Happy Family Plan - (Japan) (Tokyo Broadcasting)
