= 15th International Emmy Awards =

1987 awards ceremony

- Date: November 23, 1987
- Location: New York Hilton Midtown Hotel, New York City

The 15th International Emmy Awards took place on November 23, 1987, in New York City. The award ceremony, presented by the International Academy of Television Arts and Sciences, honors all programming produced and originally aired outside the United States.

== Ceremony ==
The singer John Denver presented a special Founder's Award to Jacques-Yves Cousteau, who has produced more than 50 films for television based on his oceanographic studies. A special Directorate Award went to Jeremy Isaacs. He was founding chief executive of Channel 4 in 1981 after a long career as a program maker and executive with the BBC and ITV and as an independent producer. The winner in the children's programming category was Degrassi Junior High. The best drama award went to Porterhouse Blue, an adaptation for television by Malcolm Bradbury for Channel 4 in four episodes. The best documentary award went to The Sworld of Islam, from ITV Granada.

== Winners ==
- Best Drama: Porterhouse Blue (Channel 4)
- Best Documentary: The Sword of Islam (Granada Television)
- Best Children's Program: Degrassi Junior High: It's Late (CBC Television)
- Founders Award: Jacques-Yves Cousteau
- Directorate Award: Jeremy Isaacs
