= 27th International Emmy Awards =

1999 awards ceremony

- Date: November 22, 1999
- Location: New York Hilton Midtown; New York City

The 27th International Emmy Awards took place on November 22, 1999, in New York City. The award ceremony, presented by the International Academy of Television Arts and Sciences (IATAS), honors all programming produced and originally aired outside the United States

== Ceremony ==
21 television shows were nominated for the 27th International Emmys, seven were from the UK, led by Channel 4 with four nominations: The Phil nominated for Best Arts Documentary; Smack the Pony for Best Popular Arts and Dispatches: A Witness to Murder in the news coverage category.

Channel 4 is also one of the co-funders along with Sky Premier of the special Rodgers and Hammerstein's Oklahoma!, which was nominated for best performing arts. Sky News programming also competed for Kosovo - Liberation Day in the news category. The ITV telefilm Lost for Words was nominated for best drama; while BBC's Born in the USSR - 14 Up was nominated for best documentary.

The prestigious Directorate Award, which was bestowed by Walter Cronkite, went to entertainment veteran Ralph Baruch, a founder of media conglom Viacom and an active leader in cultural affairs and diverse media organizations. The Founders Award was bestowed on Fuji TV’s president Hisashi Hieda in recognition of his accomplishments at the helm of the Japanese broadcaster, while the UNICEF Award went to Brazil's Culture TV.

== Winners ==
=== Best Arts Documentary ===
- UK — The Phil: Part 3
- Canada — Let It Come Down: The Life of Paul Bowles

=== Best Children & Young People Program ===
- Japan — Tell Us About Your Life - Battlefield Doctor

=== Best Documentary ===
- UK — Born in the USSR - 14 UP
- Japan — Just Like Anyone Else

=== Best Drama ===
- UK — Lost for Words

=== Best News Coverage ===
- UK — Dispatches: A Witness to Murder

=== Best Performing Arts ===
- UK — Rodgers and Hammerstein's Oklahoma!

=== Best Popular Arts ===
- UK — Smack the Pony
