= 7th International Emmy Awards =

1979 awards ceremony

- Date: November 19, 1979
- Location: Sheraton New York Times Square Hotel, New York City

The 7th International Emmy Awards took place on November 19, 1979, at the Sheraton Hotel in New York City. The award ceremony, presented by the International Academy of Television Arts and Sciences (IATAS), honors all programming produced and originally aired outside the United States.

== Ceremony ==
The 7th International Emmys ceremony took place at the Sheraton New York Times Square Hotel on November 19, 1979, in New York City. The winners were announced by the International Academy of Television Arts and Sciences (IATAS). In all, 79 programs from 14 countries were entered to compete in the four categories. The United Kingdom won three of the four awards it was competing for, while the Canadian network CBC was awarded an Emmy for best popular arts program. The award for best documentary went to The Secret Hospital, broadcast on Yorkshire Television, which tells the story of abuse, cruelty and torture in British psychiatric hospitals and their effects on the patient. The TV show was produced and directed by John Wills, executive produced by John Fairley and Michael Deakin. The BBC network won the Emmy for best drama for On Giant's Shoulders.

== Winners ==
- Best Drama - On Giant's Shoulders (Granada Television)
- Best Documentary - The Secret Hospital, Part I (Yorkshire Television)
- Best Performing Arts - Elegies for the Death of Three Spanish Poets (Allegro Films)
- Best Popular Arts Program - Rich Little's Christmas Carol (CBC Television)
- Directorate Award: Frank Stanton (President of CBS)
