= 17th International Emmy Awards =

1989 awards ceremony

- Date: November 20, 1989
- Location: Sheraton New York Times Square Hotel, New York City
- Hosted by: Smothers Brothers

The 17th International Emmy Awards took place on November 20, 1989 in New York City. The award ceremony, presented by the International Academy of Television Arts and Sciences (IATAS), honors all programming produced and originally aired outside the United States.

== Ceremony ==
The International Emmy Awards are given by the International Council of the National Academy of Television Arts and Sciences. In addition, special awards were given to Ted Turner who received the International Council's Directorate Award, and Paul Fox, who was given the Founder's Award.

== Winners ==
=== Best Children & Young People ===
- My Secret Identity (Canada: CTV Television Network)

=== Best Drama ===
- Traffik (United Kingdom: Channel 4)

=== Best Documentary ===
- Four Hours in My Lai (United Kingdom: Yorkshire Television)
