= 8th International Emmy Awards =

1980 awards ceremony

- Date: November 24, 1980
- Location: Sheraton New York Times Square Hotel, New York City
- Hosted by: Peter Ustinov

The 8th International Emmy Awards took place on November 24, 1980, in New York City and was hosted by actor Peter Ustinov. The award ceremony, presented by the International Academy of Television Arts and Sciences (IATAS), honors all programming produced and originally aired outside the United States.

== Ceremony ==
The 8th International Emmys ceremony was presented by the International Academy of Television Arts and Sciences (IATAS). Twenty-one programs from seven countries competed for statuettes in four categories. England topped the list of nominees with five nominations, followed by Canada with two, and one from Belgium, France, Japan, the Netherlands and Switzerland, respectively. Producer Jim Henson was the first International Academy honoree with the Founders Award, and Lew Grade, head of England's Associate Communications, was chosen to receive the Directorate Award.

== Winners ==
=== Best Drama ===
- A Rod of Iron (Great Britain: Yorkshire Television)

=== Best Documentary ===
- Fighting Back (Canada: Canadian Broadcasting Corporation)

=== Best Performing Arts ===
- L'Oiseau de Feu (Canada: Societe Radio-Canada)

=== Best Popular Arts Program ===
- Not the Nine O'Clock News (Great Britain: British Broadcasting Corporation)
