= 23rd International Emmy Awards =

1995 awards ceremony

- Date: 20 November 1995
- Location: Hilton Hotel; New York City, New York, U.S.
- Hosted by: Peter Ustinov

Television/radio coverage
- Network: NBC Super Channel; NBC Asia
- Produced by: Jonathan Hagey

The 23rd International Emmy Awards took place on November 20, 1995 in New York City and hosted by English actor Peter Ustinov. The award ceremony, presented by the International Academy of Television Arts and Sciences (IATAS), honors all programming produced and originally aired outside the United States.

== Ceremony ==
The nominees for the 23rd International Emmy Awards were announced on November 1, 1995, by the International Academy of Television Arts and Sciences. The awards honor programs produced and initially aired outside the United States, as well as independent productions. The award ceremony took place on November 20, 1995 in New York City.

Don Hewitt, executive producer of CBS News' 60 Minutes, will receive the Founder's Emmy for recognition of work that spans geographic and cultural boundaries; and John Birt, Director General of the BBC, was honored with the Board's Directorate Emmy.

== Broadcast ==
The awards ceremony was seen overseas via NBC SuperChannel and NBC Asia.

== Winners ==
Best Arts Documentary	Best Children & Young People Program
Kenzaburo Oe’s Long Road to Fatherhood - (Japan) (NHK); Bookmark - (United Kingdom) (BBC); A Short Film About Loving - (United Kingdom) (Channel Four/WDR)	Wise Up - (United Kingdom) (Channel Four); Confissões de Adolescente - (Brazil) (TV Cultura); Little Lord Fauntleroy - (United Kingdom) (BBC)
Best Documentary	Best Drama
Contre l'oubli - (France) (France 2); Anne Frank Remembered - (United Kingdom) (BBC); Igor: Child of Chernobyl - (United Kingdom} (Carlton Television)	The Politician's Wife - (United Kingdom) (Channel Four); Cold Comfort Farm - (United Kingdom) (BBC); Smile Through Your Tears: The Tale of Seijiro Shimada - (Japan) (NHK)
Best Performing Arts	Best Popular Arts Program
The Planets - (Canada) (Rhombus Media); Carmen - (Sweden) (Sveriges Television); Toreador Ohe Bullfighter - (Spain) (TVE)	Don't Forget Your Toothbrush - (United Kingdom) (Channel Four); Frontline - (Australia) (ABC); This Hour Has 22 Minutes - (Canada) (CBC Television)
