= 10th International Emmy Awards =

1982 awards ceremony

- Date: November 22, 1982

The 10th International Emmy Awards took place on November 22, 1982, in New York City. The award ceremony, presented by the International Academy of Television Arts and Sciences (IATAS), honors all programming produced and originally aired outside the United States.

== Ceremony ==
Television programs representing 50 television networks from 19 countries competed for the 1982 International Emmys. The ceremony was presented by the International Academy of Television Arts and Sciences (IATAS). In addition to the programming awards, the International Academy awarded Japan's Akio Morita the Emmy Directorate Award, and Michael Landon the Emmy Founders Award.

== Winners ==
=== Best Drama ===
- A Voyage Round My Father (United Kingdom: Thames Television)

=== Best Documentary ===
- Is There One Who Understands Me?: The World of James Joyce (Ireland: Raidió Teilifís Éireann)

=== Best Performing Arts ===
- Morte e Vida Severina (Brazil: TV Globo)

=== Best Popular Arts Program ===
- Alexei Sayle's Stuff (United Kingdom: BBC)
