= 9th International Emmy Awards =

1981 awards ceremony

- Date: November 23, 1981
- Location: Sheraton New York Times Square Hotel, New York City

The 9th International Emmy Awards took place on November 23, 1981, in New York City. The award ceremony, presented by the International Academy of Television Arts and Sciences (IATAS), honored all programming produced and originally aired outside the United States.

== Ceremony ==
The 9th International Emmys ceremony took place at the Sheraton New York Times Square Hotel in New York City. 110 programs from 51 television networks from 22 countries competed for the awards. Australian TV show A Town Like Alice won best drama, beating out Yorkshire Television's The Reason of Things and Granada TV's The Good Soldier. ABC News President Roone Arledge was honored with a Founders Award for his work on ABC's Wide World of Sports. Sir Huw Wheldon, chief executive of the BBC, received the board's Director Award.

== Winners ==
=== Best Drama ===
- A Town Like Alice (Australia: Mariner Films-Channel Seven)

=== Best Documentary ===
- Charters Pour L'Enfer (France: Societe Nationale de Television I)

=== Best Performing Arts ===
- Sweeney Todd: Scenes from the Making of a Musical (Great Britain: London Weekend Television)

=== Best Popular Arts Program ===
- Vinicius para Crianças - Arca de Noé (Brazil: Globo TV Network)
