= 24th International Emmy Awards =

1996 awards ceremony

- Date: November 25, 1996
- Location: New York Hilton Midtown; New York City
- Hosted by: Jamie Luner; Dick Cavett; Kenny Rogers

The 24th International Emmy Awards took place on November 25, 1996 in New York City and hosted by Jamie Luner, Dick Cavett and Kenny Rogers. The award ceremony, presented by the International Academy of Television Arts and Sciences (IATAS), honors all programming produced and originally aired outside the United States.

== Winners ==
=== Best Arts Documentary ===
- The House (United Kingdom: BBC)

=== Best Children and Young People Program ===
- Newsround Extra: War Child (United Kingdom: BBC)

=== Best Documentary ===
- The Pelican of Ramzan the Red (France: Canal +)
- People's Century: for episode 1933: Master Race (United Kingdom: BBC)
- The Saga of Life: The Unknown World (Sweden: WGBH/ZDF/Arte/Channel 4)

=== Best Drama Series ===
- La Colline aux Mille Enfants (France: France Télévisions

=== Best Popular Arts ===
- Wallace & Gromit: A Close Shave (United Kingdom: BBC)

=== Founders Award ===
- Reg Grundy (Grundy Productions)

=== Directorate Award ===
- Herbert A. Granath (ABC)
