= 13th International Emmy Awards =

1985 awards ceremony

- Date: November 25, 1985
- Location: Sheraton Center; New York City, New York

The 13th Annual International Emmy Awards took place on November 25, 1985, in New York City, New York. The awards were presented by the International Council of the National Academy of Television Arts and Sciences.

== Ceremony ==
The Renowned producer David Attenborough and ABC Board Chairman Leonard Goldenson received special awards, while programs from the UK won four of the five categories at the 13th Annual International Emmy Awards.

Only Das Boot, the German program which was nominated for six Oscars, broke the British dominations of the awards. Das Boot won as Outstanding drama series.

Attenborough was presented the Founder's Award. The award has been presented only five times in 13 years. Goldenson received the Directorate "for lifetime of dedication to the pursuit of excellence in broadcasting."

This edition featured the memorable participation of the Venezuelan artist Mirla Castellanos, performing a medley of emblematic songs from Venezuela, along with a professional dance troupe of typical Venezuelan folklore and the Venezuelan dancer Yolanda Moreno.

In addition to Das Boot, the winners in documentary category was 28 Up, and Omnibus: The Treble, in category performing arts. The winners were selected from 166 entries from 22 countries.

== Winners ==
=== Children & Young People ===
- Supergran (Great Britain: Tyne Tees Television)

=== Documentary ===
- 28 Up (Great Britain: Granada Television)

=== Drama Series ===
- Das Boot (Germany)

=== Performing Arts ===
- Omnibus: The Treble (Great Britain: British Broadcasting Corporation)

=== Popular Arts ===
- Spitting Image (Great Britain: Central Independent TV)
