= Kapo (2000 film) =

2000 documentary film

Kapo (2000) is an Israeli documentary film about the Jewish kapos who collaborated with the Nazis in concentration camps during World War II. The film was written, directed and produced by Dan Setton, with Tor Ben Mayor and Danny Paran in conjunction with Spiegel TV of Germany and Rai 3 of Italy. It was the first Israeli film to win an International Emmy Award, which it received in the category of "Best Documentary".

== Production ==
Paran and Setton had collaborated in the past on a number of Holocaust-themed films, including The Hunt for Adolf Eichmann (1994), Mengele: The Final Account (1995), Revenge (1996) and In the Fuehrer's Shadow (1997) about Martin Bormann. Setton later said that they were looking for a topic for one last film about the Holocaust before they moved on to different subject matter when they came across an article by Amos Nevo in the newspaper Yedioth Ahronoth Paran was shocked to learn that in the early days of Israel, Holocaust survivors persecuted the kapos that they identified, and that dozens of trials were held against the kapos. In one instance, a kapo was even sentenced to death under the same law that would later be used to prosecute Adolf Eichmann, but he died in prison before the sentence could be carried out.

Though Paran was the child of Holocaust survivors, he had always regarded the kapos as victims and found the effort to judge them to be "a total distortion of reality." He and Setton did not intend to judge them in their film. Paran said, "In our view, the people guilty for this horror are, of course, the Germans and not the Jews." Israeli journalist Ilana Dayan, on whose show the film was first screened, later said, "This is not a film that judges or analyzes the phenomenon. This is a film that introduces the phenomenon." Nevertheless, the stories often shocked the film's creators. Setton says that he suffered from insomnia long after finishing the film.

The plan was to combine eyewitness testimonies and interviews with legal documents describing the prosecution of kapos for collaboration with the Nazis. Paran and Setton also interviewed Haim Cohn, a justice of the Supreme Court of Israel, who had tried a former kapo in the 1960s. In their search for interviews, the filmmakers traveled around the world looking for people who were prepared to admit that they were kapos in the concentration camps. Many of the prospective interviewees refused to take their calls.

Others were more willing to tell their side of the story. In Australia, the filmmakers met with Magda, who headed a subcamp of 30,000 Jewish women in Auschwitz. She claimed that she only did good to the prisoners, and that if she beat them or punished them, it was only to save their lives—"not to exterminate them."

== Reception ==
Response to the film was mixed among both Jewish and non-Jewish audiences. Setton said that at a screening before a Jewish audience in Munich, the younger members of the audience were pleased that someone had dared to broach the subject, while older audience members were outraged. Only a censored version of the film was aired on German television in fear of a hostile reaction by the viewing audience. In France, opposition to the film was so severe that La 25^{e} Heure, the show on which it was screened, was taken off the air.

Nevertheless, the film received the International Emmy Award for Best Documentary Film in 2000. It was the highest honor ever received by an Israeli film at the time.
