= International Academy of Television Arts and Sciences =

American nonprofit organization

- Abbreviation: IATAS
- Founded: 1969; 57 years ago
- Location: 25 W 52nd Street, New York, NY 10019 USA
- Region served: International television industry
- Product: International Emmy Award; International Emmy Awards Current Affairs & News; International Emmy Kids Award
- President: Bruce L. Paisner (CEO and President)
- Website: iemmys.tv

The International Academy of Television Arts & Sciences (IATAS) is an American nonprofit membership organization, based in New York City, composed of leading media and entertainment executives across all sectors of the television industry, from over fifty countries. Founded in 1969, the International Academy recognize excellence in television production produced outside the United States and it presents the International Emmy Awards in seventeen categories.

In addition to the International Emmys, the Academy's annual schedule includes the prestigious International Emmy Awards Current Affairs & News and the International Emmy Kids Awards, and a series of events such as International Academy Day, the International World Emmy Festival and Panels on substantive industry topics.

IATAS was originally founded in 1969 as the International Council of the National Academy of Television Arts and Sciences (NATAS) by TV executives Ralph Baruch and Ted Cott. While the NATAS and sister organization Academy of Television Arts & Sciences (ATAS) primarily focus on U.S. domestic television programming, including the specific Emmy Award ceremonies those two bodies present, the IATAS was established to expose the importance of television as a global concept. Bruce Paisner is IATAS' current president and CEO.

== History ==
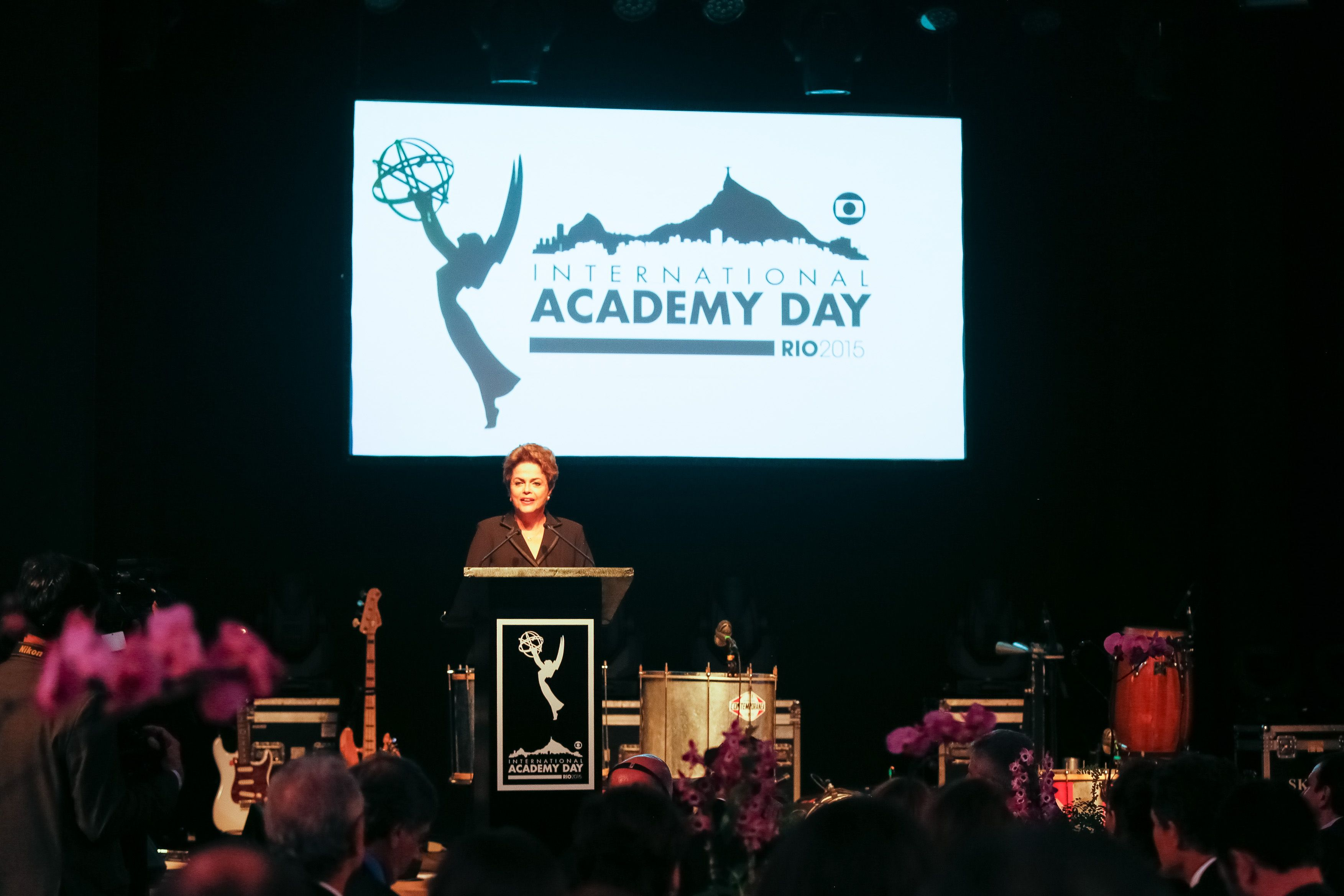
Brazilian President Dilma Rousseff speaks during the opening of the International Academy Day, in the city of Rio de Janeiro.

Early in its history, the International Academy of Television Arts and Sciences was part of the National Academy of Television Arts and Sciences; however, operating with its own board with a global focus. Founded in 1969, IATAS is an organization of leading media and entertainment figures from over 500 companies from 60 countries across all television sectors, including internet, mobile and technology. Its mission is to recognize the excellence of content produced exclusively for TV outside the United States, as well as non-English language primetime programming made for American TV. The awards are presented at the International Emmy Awards Gala, held each year in November at the Hilton Hotel and Resort in Midtown Manhattan, attracting over 1,200 television professionals annually.

The first International Emmy Awards, as we know them today, were carried out in 1973. As well as the Gala, the International Academy also produces the International Emmy World Television Festival. The Television Festival screens the current year's International Emmy-nominated programs and features producers and directors who speak about their work. In 1999, the Academy went on to recognize excellence in international news coverage with the Emmy Awards for Current Affairs & News. The International Emmy Kids Awards were launched in 2013 and is held annually in February in New York City.

International Academy Day

The Academy hosts "International Academy Day," a high-level global initiative designed to foster collaboration between the Academy and key regional media markets. The event serves as a forum for examining regional business models and cultural institutions within the global media ecosystem.

In 2025, the International Academy Day was held in Rio de Janeiro, hosted by Globo. The event featured keynotes and panel discussions on the "Third Pivot" of media—the shift from global standardization toward regional sovereignty and data-driven measurement. The summit's opening panel, which addressed the future of television architecture in Brazil, was moderated by strategist and media executive Antonio Wanderley (CEO of IBOPE), alongside senior leadership from Globo and regional broadcasters.

== Categories ==
- Best Arts Programming
- Best Performance by an Actor
- Best Performance by an Actress
- Best Comedy
- Best Documentary
- Best Sports Documentary
- Best Drama Series
- Best Short-Form Series
- Best Non-English Language U.S. Primetime Program
- Best Non-Scripted Entertainment
- Best Telenovela
- Best TV Movie/Mini-Series
- Current Affairs
- News
- Kids: Animation
- Kids: Factual & Entertainment
- Kids: Live-Action

The Academy's Foundation also presents the annual Sir Peter Ustinov Television Scriptwriting Award for young television writers. In 2013, J. J. Abrams was presented with an International Emmy Founders Award, and Anke Schäferkordt was presented with an International Emmy Directorate Award.

== Notable winners ==
Other notable winners include Sir David Frost and Steven Spielberg.

== See also ==
- Academy of Television Arts & Sciences
- National Academy of Television Arts and Sciences
- International Emmy Award
- List of International Emmy Award winners
- Academy of Interactive Arts & Sciences
