= Vera (given name) =

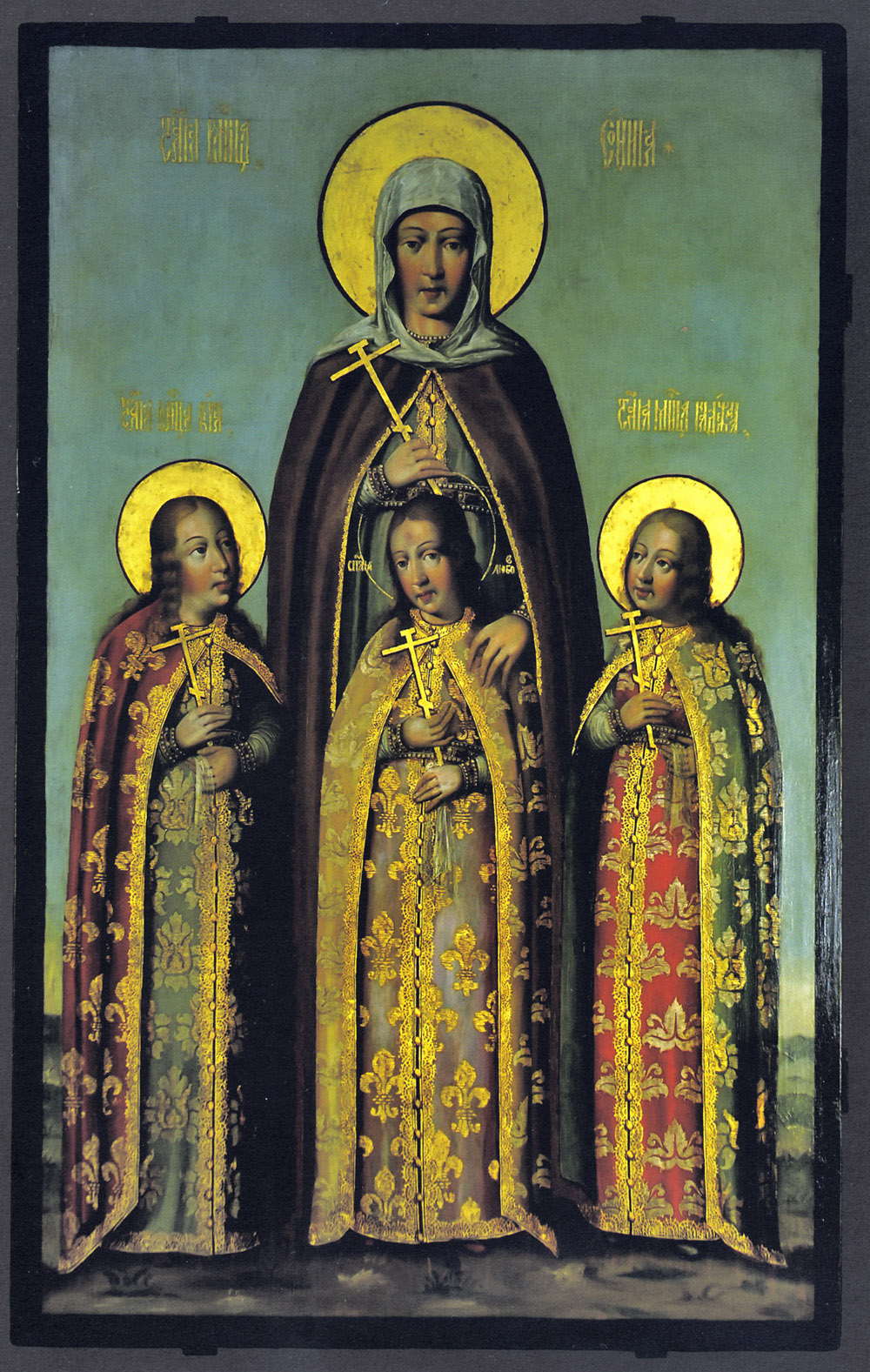
- Pronunciation: /ˈvɪərə, ˈvɛrə/
- Gender: Female

Origin
- Origin: Slavic
- Meaning: "Faith"
- Region of origin: Europe

Other names
- Nicknames: Věrka, Věrča, Věruška
- Popularity: see popular names

Vera (Cyrillic: Вера: Véra) is a female given name of Slavic origin, the translation of old Christian name with Latin form Fides (Faith, Foy) and Greek Πίστις (Pistis).

The name Vera has been used in the English speaking world since the 19th century and was popular in the early 20th century.

Cyrillic script: Вера (Russian, Bulgarian, Serbian, Macedonian)

Diminutives: Verica (Serbian and Croatian), Verka or Vierka (Slovak), Verka, Verochka, Verunya, Verushka (Russian), Veer or Veertje (Dutch).

Other languages: Véra (French), Věra (Czech), Veera (Finnish), Wiera, Wiara (Polish), Ukrainian: Віра, romanized: Vira, Viera (Slovak), فيرا (Arabic)

In Turkish Vera means piety. It is usually a feminine name.

== Origin ==
In the Ancient Greek Christian faith, Saint Fides (Faith or Vera), her sisters Spes (Hope) and Caritas (Love) (saints Faith, Hope and Charity) and their mother Sophia (Wisdom), died as martyrs in the second century AD during the persecution of Christians in the Roman Empire under the emperor Hadrian. The names are also the words designating the three key Christian virtues mentioned in Apostle Paul's First Epistle to the Corinthians (1 Corinthians 13:13).

Thus the name Vera entered the Russian culture as part of the trio: Vera, Nadezhda, and Lyubov as a calque from Greek of the names of saints. In the 9th century, when liturgical books were translated into Church Slavonic, the sisters' names were also translated. In the Russian tradition, these four saints are now very popular, with their feast day on September 30th.

In the Russian naming tradition, the names Vera, Nadezhda, and Lyubov were not used for a very long time—until the beginning of the 18th century. The French saint with this name is little known in Orthodox countries.

== A ==
- Vera Albreht (1895–1971), Slovene poet, writer, publicist and translator
- Vera Aleksandrova (1895–1966), Russian literary critic, historian, and editor
- Vera Alentova (1942–2025), Soviet and Russian actress
- Vera Allison (1902–1993), American Modernist jeweler, painter
- Vera Altayskaya (1919–1978), Soviet actress
- Vera Eugenia Andrus (1895–1979), American artist and printmaker
- Vera Anisimova (born 1952), Soviet athlete
- Vera Anstey (1889–1976), British economist
- Vera Atkins (1908–2000), Romanian-born British intelligence officer during World War II

== B ==
- Vera Baboun (born 1964), Palestinian politician
- Vera Baeva (1930–2017), Bulgarian writer and composer
- Vera Baird (born 1950), British Labour Party activist, barrister, author and lecturer
- Vera Baklanova (born 1947), Soviet Olympic diver
- Vera Baranovskaya (1885–1935), Russian actress
- Vera Barbosa (born 1989), Portuguese track and field athlete
- Vera Barclay (1893–1989), British novelist and leading female pioneer Scouter
- Vera Bazarova (born 1993), Russian pair skater
- Vera Begić (born 1982), Croatian athlete
- Véra Belmont (born 1938), French film producer, director and screenwriter
- Vera Berdich (1915–2003), American printmaker
- Vera Bergkamp (born 1971), Dutch politician
- Věra Bílá (1954–2019), Romani musician and singer of Romani folk and pop songs
- Vera Bjelik (1921–1944), Soviet World War II aircraft navigator
- Vera Blagojević (1920–1942), Yugoslav political activist
- Vera von Blumenthal, American potter and educator
- Vera Bogetti (1902–1985), British stage and film actress
- Vera Borea, French fashion designer
- Vera de Bosset (1888–1982), Russian-born American dancer and artist
- Vera Bradford (1904–2004), Australian classical pianist and teacher
- Vera Brezhneva (born 1982), Ukrainian pop-singer and television presenter
- Vera Brittain (1893–1970), English writer
- Vera Broido (1907–2004), Russian-born British writer
- Vera Brosgol (born 1984), Russian-born American cartoonist and animator
- Vera Scantlebury Brown (1889–1946), Australian medical practitioner and pediatrician
- Vera Brühne (1910–2001), German victim of miscarriage of justice
- Vera Bryndzei (born 1952), Ukrainian speed skater
- Vera Buch (1895–1987), American political activist and union organizer
- Vera Buchanan (1902–1955), American Democratic politician
- Vera Burt (1927–2017), New Zealand cricketer and field hockey player
- Vera C. Bushfield (1889–1976), American politician

== C ==
- Vera Alexandrovna Tiscenko Calder (1902–1983), Russian actress
- Vera Carmi (1914–1969), Italian film actress
- Vera Carrara (born 1980), Italian professional racing cyclist
- Vera Cáslavská (1942–2016), Czech gymnast
- Vera Caspary (1899–1987), American writer
- Vera Celis (born 1959), Belgian politician
- Věra Černá (born 1963), Czech artistic gymnast
- Vera Chapman (1898–1996), English author and founder of the first Tolkien Society
- Vera Chino (born 1943), Native American potter
- Vera Chirwa (born 1932), Malawian-born lawyer and human and civil rights activist
- Vera Chytilová (1929–2014), Czech film director
- Vera Cleto (born 1950), Brazilian former professional tennis player
- Véra Clouzot (1913–1960), Brazilian-born French film actress and screenwriter
- Vera Coking, American eminent domain litigant
- Vera Conlon (1906–1994), British archaeological photographer
- Grand Duchess Vera Constantinovna of Russia (1854–1912), daughter of Grand Duke Konstantine Nicholaievich of Russia
- Princess Vera Constantinovna of Russia (1906–2001), youngest child of Grand Duke Konstantine Konstantinovich of Russia
- Vera Cordeiro (born 1950), Brazilian social entrepreneur and physician
- Vera Cornish, British stage and film actress
- Vera Čukić, Serbian stage and film actress
- Vera Cudjoe (born 1928), Trinidadian-Canadian actress, producer, and educator

== D ==
- Vera Dajht-Kralj (1928–2014), Croatian Jewish sculptor
- Vera Day (born 1935), British film and television actress
- Vera Micheles Dean (1903–1972), Russian-American political scientist
- Vera Djatel (born 1984), Ukrainian footballer
- Vera Douie (1894–1979), Scottish librarian and activist
- Vera Drew, American filmmaker
- Vera Dua (born 1952), Belgian politician
- Vera Duarte (born 1952), Cape Verdean human rights activist and politician
- Vera Ducas (1912–1948), Czechoslovak Jewish woman murdered in Israel reportedly for spying
- Vera Dulova (1909–2000), Russian harpist
- Vera Ðurašković (born 1949), Yugoslav basketball player
- Vera Dushevina (born 1986), Russian tennis player
- Vera Duss (1910–2005), American-born French medical doctor and Roman Catholic nun

== E ==
- Vera Elkan (1908–2008), South African photographer
- Vera Etches (born 1975), Canadian physician
- Vera Evison (1918–2018), British archaeologist and academic

== F ==
- Vera Farmiga (born 1973), American actress of Ukrainian origin
- Vera King Farris (1938–2009), American zoologist and academic
- Věra Ferbasová (1913–1976), Czechoslovak film actress
- Vera Figner (1852–1942), Russian revolutionary
- Vera Filatova (born 1982), Ukrainian-born British actress
- Vera Fischer (mathematician), Austrian mathematician
- Vera Fischer (sculptor) (1925–2009), Croatian sculptor
- Vera Fischer (actress) (born 1951), Brazilian actress
- Vera Flasarová (born 1952), Czech politician
- Vera Fogwill (born 1972), Argentine film and television actress, film director, and screenplay writer
- Vera Chandler Foster (1915–2001), American social worker
- Vera Frances (born 1930), British actress
- Vera Francis, Native American writer and activist
- Vera Freeman (1865–1896), American stage actress
- Vera Friedländer (1928–2019), German writer and Holocaust survivor
- Vera Furness (1921–2002), English chemist and industrial manager

== G ==
- Vera Galushka-Duyunova (1945–2012), Russian volleyball player
- Vera Gebuhr (1916–2014), Danish film actress
- Vera Gedroitz (1870–1932), Lithuanian princess, doctor of medicine and writer
- Vera Georgiyevna Orlova (1894–1977), Russian actress
- Vera Gissing (1928–2022), Czech-British writer, translator, and one of "Winton's children"
- Vera Glaser (1916–2008), American journalist and feminist
- Vera Gornostayeva (1929–2015), Russian pianist
- Vera Grabe (born 1951), Colombian anthropologist and politician
- Vera Mae Green (1928–1982), African American anthropologist, scholar, educator, author
- Vera Griner (1890–1992), Russian music teacher
- Viera Gašparíková (1928–2023), Slovak writer, folklorist and Slavist

== H ==
- Vera Hacken (1912–1988), American writer, director, translator
- Věra Hainzová (1930–2018), Czech academic painter and animator of cartoons
- Vera Hall (1902–1964), American folk singer
- Vera Harsányi (born 1919, date of death unknown), Hungarian freestyle swimmer
- Vera Hayward (1902–1999), New Zealand teacher
- Vera Henriksen (1927–2016), Norwegian writer
- Vera Hilger (born 1971), German painter
- Vera Holland (1949–1996), English woman who was murdered
- Vera Holme (1881–1969), also known as Jack Holme, British actress and a suffragette.
- Vera Louise Holmøy (born 1931), Norwegian judge
- Vera Holtz (born 1953), Brazilian television and cinema actress
- Vera Huckel (1908–1999), American mathematician and aerospace engineer

== I ==
- Vera Ilyina (born 1974), Russian diver
- Vera Inber (1890–1972), Russian-Soviet poet and writer
- Vera Int-Veen (born 1967), German journalist and television presenter
- Vera Isaku (born 1955), Albanian journalist

== J ==
- Vera James (1892–1980), New Zealand-born theatre and film actor
- Věra Janoušková (1922–2010), Czech sculptor, painter and graphic artist
- Vera Jeftimijades (born 1937), Yugoslav fencer
- Vera Jocić (1923–1944), Yugoslav partisan
- Vera Johnson (1920–2007), Canadian folk singer
- Vera Jordanova (born 1975), Bulgarian-Finnish model and actress
- Věra Jourová (born 1964), Czech politician and lawyer

== K ==
- Vera Kamsha (born 1962), Russian author of high fantasy and journalist
- Vera Karalli (1889–1972), Russian ballet dancer, choreographer and silent film actress
- Vera Karmishina-Ganeeva (born 1988), Russian athlete
- Vera Katz (1933–2017), American Democratic politician
- Vera Kharuzhaya (1903–1942), Belarusian Communist writer and activist
- Vera Kholodnaya (1893–1919), Russian silent film actress
- Vera Kingston (1917–1996), English swimmer
- Vera Klement (1929–2023), Polish-born American artist
- Věra Klimková (born 1957), Czechoslovak cross country skier
- Vera Kobalia (born 1981), Georgian politician
- Vera Koedooder (born 1983), Dutch professional racing cyclist
- Věra Kohnová (1929–1942), Czech Jewish diarist and concentration camp victim
- Vera Kolodzig (born 1985), German-Portuguese actress
- Vera Komarkova (1942–2005), Czech-born American mountaineer and botanist
- Vera Komisova (born 1953), Russian hurdler
- Vera Komissarzhevskaya (1864–1910), Russian actress
- Véra Korène (1901–1996), Russian-born French actress and singer
- Vera Koval (born 1983), Russian judoka
- Vera Krasnova (born 1950), Russian speed skater
- Vera Krasova (born 1987), Russian model and beauty queen
- Vera Krepkina (1933–2023), Russian athlete
- Vera Kublanovskaya (1920–2012), Russian mathematician
- Věra Kůrková (born 1948), Czech computer scientist

== L ==
- Vera Lantratova (1947–2021), Russian volleyball player
- Vera Leigh (1903–1944), British spy during World War II
- Vera Lengsfeld (born 1952), German politician
- Vera Leth (born 1958), Greenlandic Ombudsman
- Vera Lewis (1873–1956), American film and stage actress
- Vera Lindsay (1911–1992), British Shakespearean actress
- Vera Lischka (born 1977), Austrian breaststroke swimmer
- Vera G. List (1908–2002), American art collector and philanthropist
- Vera Liubatovich (1855–1907), Russian revolutionary
- Vera Bate Lombardi (1885–1948), English-born socialite
- Vera Looser (born 1993), Namibian road cyclist and mountain biker
- Vera Lutter (born 1960), German-born American artist
- Vera Lynn (1917–2020), English singer
- Vera Lysklætt (born 1954), Norwegian politician

== M ==
- Vera Mackey, Irish camogie player
- Vera MacLeavy (1919–2008), English librarian and Moravian Church archivist
- Vera Malinovskaya (1900–1988), Russian silent film actress
- Vera Malycheff (1886–1964), Russian-born French geologist, soil scientist
- Vera Manuel (1949–2010), Canadian First Nations writer
- Vera Maretskaya (1906–1978), Russian actress
- Vera Laughton Mathews (1888–1959), English Women's Royal Naval Service officer
- Vera Nikolaevna Maslennikova (1926–2000), Russian mathematician
- Vera Matović (born 1946), Serbian folk singer
- Vera Maxwell (1901–1995), American sportswear and fashion designer
- Vera McKechnie (born 1927), British children's television presenter
- Vera Menchik (1906–1944), British chess player
- Vera Michalski (born 1954), Swiss publisher
- Vera Mikhailova (1907–1985), Soviet children's writer and journalist
- Vera Miles (born 1930), American actress
- Vera Mischenko, Russian attorney and environmentalist
- Vera Misevich (1945–1995), Ukrainian equestrian
- Vera Molnár (1924–2023), Hungarian media artist who lived and worked in Paris, France
- Vera Moskalyuk (born 1981), Ukrainian-born Russian judoka
- Vera Mossa (born 1964), retired Brazilian volleyball player
- Vera Mukhina (1889–1953), Russian sculptor
- Vera Mutafchieva (1929–2009), Bulgarian writer and historian
- Vera Myller (1880–1970), Russian mathematician who became the first female professor in Romania

== N ==
- Véra Nabokov (1902–1991), wife, editor, and translator of Vladimir Nabokov
- Vera Nazarian (born 1966), Russian-born American fantasy and science fiction writer
- Vera Nazina (born 1931), Russian painter
- Vera Nebolsina (born 1989), Russian chess player
- Vera Neumann (1907–1993), American fashion designer
- Vera Nikolić (1948–2021), Serbian track and field athlete
- Vera Nikolić Podrinska (1886–1972), Croatian painter and baroness

== O ==
- Vera Olcott (1893–19?), American dancer
- Vera Olsson (born 1974), Finnish television producer and television host
- Vera Georgiyevna Orlova (1894–1977), Russian Soviet actress
- Vera Markovna Orlova (1918–1993), Soviet Russian actress
- Vera Osoianu, Moldovan librarian, activist and writer

== P ==
- Vera Page (1921–1931), British murder victim
- Vera Jayne Palmer (1933–1967), birth name of Jayne Mansfield, American actress
- Vera Panova (1905–1973), Soviet novelist, playwright, and journalist
- Vera Pauw (born 1963), Dutch football coach and former player
- Vera Pavlova (born 1963), Russian poet
- Vera Pearce (1895–1966), Australian stage and film actress
- Vera Perlin (1902–1974), Canadian humanitarian
- Vera Pezer (born 1939), Canadian curler and academic
- Vera Pigee (1924–2007), American civil rights worker in Clarksdale, Mississippi
- Vera Pless (1931–2020), American mathematician
- Vera Popkova (1943–2011), Soviet track and field athlete
- Vera Popova (1867–1896), Russian chemist
- Vera Pospíšilová-Cechlová (born 1978), Czech athlete
- Vera Putina (1926–2023), Georgian woman who claimed that Vladimir Putin was her lost son

== R ==
- Vera Hruba Ralston (1919–2003), Czech-American skater and actress
- Vera Ramaciotti (1891–1982), Australian philanthropist
- Vera Renczi (1903–19??), Romanian serial killer
- Vera Reynolds (1899–1962), American film actress
- Vera Rich (1936–2009), British poet, journalist, historian, and translator
- Vera Ellen Westmeier Rohe (known as Vera-Ellen, 1921–1981), American actress
- Vera Rózsa (1917–2010), Hungarian singer
- Vera Rubin (1928–2016), American astronomer
- Věra Růžičková (1928–2018), Czech gymnast

== S ==
- Vera Beaudin Saeedpour (1930–2010), American researcher and scholar
- Vera Salvequart (1919–1947), Czech-born German concentration camp nurse executed for war crimes
- Vera Sandberg (1895–1979), Swedish engineer
- Vera Santos (born 1981), Portuguese race walker
- Alina Vera Savin (born 1988), Romanian bobsledder
- Vera Scarth-Johnson (1912–1999), British-born Australian botanist and botanical illustrator
- Vera Schmidt (born 1982), Hungarian singer-songwriter
- Vera Fedorovna Schmidt (1889–1937), Russian educationist and psychoanalyst
- Vera Schmiterlöw (1904–1987), Swedish actress
- Vera Schwarcz (born 1947), Romanian-born American sinologist and academic
- Vera Sennyei (1915–1962), Hungarian actress
- Vera Sessina (born 1986), Russian gymnast
- Vera Sheehan, Irish camogie player
- Vera Shimanskaya (born 1981), Russian rhythmic gymnast
- Vera Brady Shipman (1889–1932), American composer, journalist, and writer
- Vera Shitjeni (born 1974), Albanian politician
- Vera Shtelbaums (born 1937), Russian rhythmic gymnastics coach
- Vera Shvetsova (born 1929), Russian ballet teacher and balletmaster
- Eleonora Vera Sipos (1900–1988), New Zealand businesswoman, humanitarian and welfare worker
- Vera Sisson (1891–1954), American film actress of the silent era
- Vera Slutskaya (1874–1917), Russian revolutionary
- Vera Šnajder (1904–1976), Bosnian mathematician
- Vera Sobetova (born 1992), Russian sprint canoeist
- Vera Sokolova (born 1987), Russian race walker
- Vera T. Sós (1930–2023), Hungarian mathematician
- Vera Sotnikova (born 1960), Soviet (Russian) theatre, television and movie actress
- Věra Soukupová (born 1932), Czech mezzo-soprano
- Vera Stanley Alder (1898–1984), English portrait painter and mystic
- Vera Steadman (1900–1966), American film actress of the silent era
- Vera Storozheva (born 1958), Russian actress and film director
- Vera Strodl Dowling (1918–2015), Danish pilot and flying instructor who was only Scandinavian woman to fly for the Air Transport Auxiliary.
- Vera Stroyeva (1903–1991), Soviet film director and screenwriter
- Vera Suchánková (1932–2004), Czechoslovak pair skater
- Věra Suková (1931–1982), Czech tennis player
- Vera Summers (1899–????), Australian high school teacher and principal
- Vera Szemere (1923–1995), Hungarian actress

== T ==
- Vera Telenius (1912–1991), Finnish singer
- Vera Thomas (1921–1995), English table tennis player
- Vera Thulin (1893–1974), Swedish freestyle swimmer
- Vera Timanova (1855–1942), Russian pianist
- Vera Trefilova (1875–1943), Russian dancer and teacher
- Vera Tschechowa (1940–2024), German film actress

== U ==
- Vera Ulyakina (born 1986), Russian volleyball player

== V ==
- Vera Vague (1906–1974), American actress, also known by Barbara Jo Allen
- Vera Valdez (1936–2026), Brazilian model
- Věra Vančurová (1932–2018), Czech gymnast
- Vera VanGuard (born 1986), Russian-American filmmaker, cosplay, musician, puppeteer and actress
- Vera Vasilchikova (1780–1814), Russian minor aristocrat
- Vera Velichkina (1868–1918), Russian physician, revolutionary and writer
- Vera Veljkov-Medaković (1923–2011), Serbian pianist and piano teacher
- Vera Venczel (1946–2021), Hungarian actress
- Vera Viczián (born 1972), Hungarian cross country skier
- Vera Volkova (1905–1975), Russian ballet dancer and dance teacher
- Vera Voronina (1905–?), Russian actress
- Věra Votrubcová (1911–1981), Czechoslovak table tennis player
- Věra Vovsová (1912–1998), Czech painter

== W ==
- Vera Wang (born 1949), American fashion designer
- Vera Weizmann (1881–1966), Russian-born Israeli medical doctor and a Zionist activist
- Vera White (1893–1949), American silent film actress
- Vera Williams (1927–2015), American children's writer and illustrator
- Vera Woodhouse, Lady Terrington (1889–1973), British Liberal Party politician

== Y ==
- Vera Yurasova (1928–2023), Russian physicist

== Z ==
- Vera Zakharova (1920–2010), Soviet military pilot
- Vera Zasulich (1849–1919), Russian Marxist writer and revolutionary
- Vera Zavitsianou (1927–2008), Greek theatre actress
- Vera Zhelikhovsky (1835–1896), Russian writer
- Vera Zimmermann, Brazilian actress
- Vera Zorina (1917–2003), American actress
- Vera Zorina (singer) (1853–1903), Russian operetta singer
- Vera Zozulya (born 1956), Latvian-born Soviet luger
- Vera Zvonareva (born 1984), Russian tennis player

== Fictional characters ==
- Vera Douka, fictional character in the ANT1 television series Erotas
- Vera Drake, title character of a 2004 British Mike Leigh film
- Vera Duckworth, a character from the British soap opera, Coronation Street
- Vera Juarez, character from the British television soap opera Torchwood: Miracle Day
- Vera Peterson, an unseen character on the television show Cheers
- Verka Serduchka, a Ukrainian drag comedian played by Andriy Danylko
- Vera Stanhope, character in a series of detective novels by Ann Cleeves and the television series Vera based on these novels
- Vera Sweet, a character from DC Comics

== See also ==
- Vera (surname)
- Vera (disambiguation)
