= Moominvalley (TV series) =

2019 Finnish-British TV drama series

- Genre: Animated family drama
- Based on: Moomin by Tove Jansson and Lars Jansson
- Developed by: Marika Makaroff; Steve Box
- Written by: Mark Huckerby; Nick Ostler; Steve Box
- Directed by: Steve Box (S1–2); Sara Barbas (S3–4); Nigel Davies (S3–4); Jay Grace (S3); Darren Robbie (S3)
- Voices of: Taron Egerton (S1–2); Jack Rowan (S3–4); Rosamund Pike; Matt Berry; Edvin Endre; Bel Powley; Richard Ayoade; Akiya Henry; Will Self; Warwick Davis; Kate Winslet (S1–2); Teresa Gallagher (S3–4); Jennifer Saunders; Chance Perdomo
- Composers: Samuli Kosminen; Jarmo Saari (S2–3); Pekka Kuusisto
- Countries of origin: Finland; United Kingdom
- Original languages: English; Finnish; Swedish; Sami
- No. of seasons: 4
- No. of episodes: 52

Production
- Executive producer: Marika Makaroff
- Producers: John Woolley (S1); Marion Edwards; Louise Holmes; Steve Dorrance
- Running time: 22 minutes
- Production companies: Gutsy Animations; Yle; Sky Group

Original release
- Network: Yle TV2
- Release: 25 February 2019 – 6 January 2025
- Network: Sky One
- Release: 19 April 2019 – 13 April 2020
- Network: Sky Showcase
- Release: 1 April 2022 – 13 November 2024

Moominvalley (Finnish: Muumilaakso, Swedish: Mumindalen, also known as just Moomin) is a Finnish-British animated family drama television series. An adaptation of the Moomin books and comics by Finnish writer-illustrator Tove Jansson and her brother Lars Jansson, it is created using new techniques in 3D CGI.

Finnish production company Gutsy Animations ran a crowdfunding campaign on Indiegogo from 8 March to 21 April 2017. The campaign was organised in order to raise funds towards visual development of the series. Animation company Anima Vitae was appointed as the lead animation company for the first two seasons of the series. The series is Finland's most expensive television show with a €20 million budget.

In 2019, the series' first episode was the most watched program on Finnish national broadcaster Yle's streaming service Yle Areena. The series became the most watched show ever on Yle Areena and the most watched television series of 2019 in the whole of Finland. The series has 16 million streams on Yle Areena.

== Synopsis ==
The protagonist of the series is Moomintroll, who is curious, kind, sensitive, and idealistic. He is a typical hero in a coming-of-age story: he tries to tackle the puzzle of growing up to his true, individualistic self while remaining a beloved part of the family. He lives with his caring Moominmamma and nostalgic Moominpappa. Moomintroll is joined in his adventures by his best friend the free-spirited wanderer Snufkin, the chaotic Little My, daydreamer Snorkmaiden, cowardly Sniff, and many other friends.

== Cast and characters ==
Character	English actor	Finnish actor	Finland Swedish actor	Japanese actor	Northern-Sami actor	Inari Sami Actor	Skolt Sami actor
Moomintroll	Taron Egerton (S1–2); Jack Rowan (S3–4)	Joonas Nordman	Christoffer Strandberg	Junta Terashima	Áilu Valle	Mikkâl Morottaja	Teemu Titola
Moominmamma	Rosamund Pike	Satu Silvo	Maria Sid	Kikuko Inoue	Siri Broch Johansen	Anna Morottaja	Tiina Sanila-Aikio
Moominpappa	Matt Berry	Ville Haapasalo	Carl-Kristian Rundman	Yasunori Matsumoto	Mikkel Gaup	Aimo Aikio	Tauno Ljetoff
Snufkin	Edvin Endre	Olavi Uusivirta	Paavo Kerosuo	Issey Takahashi	Niko Valkeapää	Tomi Koivunen	Tuomas Kiprianoff
Little My	Bel Powley	Kiti Kokkonen (S1–3) Aksa Korttila (S4)	Saga Sarkola	Ikue Otani	Irene Länsman	Auri Ahola	Neeta Jääskö
Snorkmaiden	Akiya Henry	Alina Tomnikov	Edith Holmström	Minami Tsuda	Linda Tammela	Heli Huovinen	Heidi Gauriloff
Sniff	Warwick Davis	Markku Haussila	Andreas af Enehielm	Koji Ochiai	Aslak Paltto	Marko Tervaniemi	Pavlo Heikkinen
Muskrat	Will Self	Heikki Harma	Max Bremer (S1, S2 eps 1–5, 13); Sixten Lundberg (S2 eps 6–9)	Nobuaki Kanemitsu	Pentti Pieski	Yrjö Musta	Erkki Lumisalmi
Hemulens (male)	Joe Wilkinson	Taisto Oksanen	Pekka Strang	Tetsuharu Ōta	Tuomas Huusko	Tuomas Huusko	Jouko Moshnikoff
Hemulens (female)	Susie Brann	Ella Pyhältö	Cecilia Paul	Yoko Matsuoka	Inger-Mari Aikio	N/A	N/A
Fillyjonk	Kate Winslet (S1–2) Teresa Gallagher (S3–4)	Kristiina Halttu	Nina Hukkinen	Shiho Hisajima	Anna Näkkäläjärvi-Länsman	Suvi King	Tiina Sanila-Aikio
Mymble	Jennifer Saunders	Lotta Lindroos	Hellen Willberg	Yuriko Ishigane	Annukka Hirvasvuopio-Laiti	Marke Laaksonen	Heini Wesslin
Too-ticky	Katie Leung (S1–2) Teresa Gallagher (S3–4)	Elina Knihtilä	Nina Palmgren	Momoko Yamafuji	Anne Olli	N/A	N/A
Emma The Stage Rat	Alison Steadman	Arja Saijonmaa	Arja Saijonmaa	Yuko Kobayashi	Suvi West	N/A	N/A
Misabel	Rebecca Root	Miiko Toiviainen	Kaj Korkea-Aho	Kozue Harashima	Aslak Paltto	N/A	N/A
Ninny	Mayumi Kawai	Yasmine Yamajako	Jenna Hukkinen	Yui Fukuo	Iŋgá Ravna-Pieski	N/A	N/A
Teety-Woo	Matt Lucas	Lauri Ketonen	Olli Liljeström	Kunihiro Kawamoto	Pekka Aikio	N/A	N/A
The Ghost	Richard Ayoade	Ali Jahangiri	André Wickström	Kyousei Tsukui	Pekka Aikio	N/A	N/A
Mr Brisk	Julian Barratt	Riku Nieminen	Kristofer Gummerus	Yukito Soma	N/A	N/A	Juha Feodoroff
The Hobgoblin	Adewale Akinnuoye-Agbaje	Jorma Uotinen	Nicke Lignell	Hidenari Ugaki	N/A	Veikko Aikio	N/A
Thingumy	Jon Monie	Anna Puu	Iida Kuningas	Kōsuke Echigoya	N/A	Niina Aikio-Siltala	N/A
Bob	Susie Brann	Paula Vesala	Sara Soulié	Mitsuhiro Inose	N/A	Sari Sarre	N/A
The Fisherman	Rhys Darby	Kari Ketonen	Oskar Pöysti	Hiroyuki Shibamoto	N/A	N/A	Markus Juutinen
Seahorse 1	Miriam-Teak Lee	Saara Aalto	Emma Klingenberg	Mariko Munakata	N/A	N/A	Anna Lumikivi
Seahorse 2	Shalom Brune-Franklin	Anna-Maija Tuokko	Jennie Storbacka	Sayaka Narita	N/A	N/A	Sonja Hovslagare
Toffle	Iina Kuustonen	Iina Kuustonen	Nina Palmgren	Sachiko Honma	N/A	N/A	Mariann Bernhardt
The Groke	Susie Brann	Susie Brann	Susie Brann	Susie Brann	Susie Brann	Susie Brann	Susie Brann
Snork	Chance Perdomo	Deogracias Masomi	Tom Rejstörm				
Stinky	Mike Wilmot	Santeri Kinnunen	Elmer Bäck				
Aunt Jane	Ellen Thomas	Kaisla Löyttyjärvi	Jonna Järnefelt				
Joxter	Joonas Saartamo	Joonas Saartamo	Joonas Saartamo				
Artist							

== Music ==
=== Original music score ===
The original music score for the series is composed by Finnish musicians, classical violinist Pekka Kuusisto and percussionist Samuli Kosminen, with Jarmo Saari joining them in season 2. The music supervisor for the series is Virpi Immonen. Kuusisto's father, Ilkka Kuusisto, had previously composed an opera for the Moomins with Tove Jansson in 1974.

=== Official soundtrack ===
==== Season 1 ====
The Moominvalley TV series also includes episodic songs which are produced in collaboration with Columbia Records and Sony Music Entertainment. The official soundtrack for the series was released on 19 April 2019. It includes 16 original recordings from a line-up of artists including Tom Odell, First Aid Kit, Alma, dodie, Delilah Montagu, Declan McKenna, MØ, SOAK and many more.

A limited edition 12" picture disc on clear vinyl was made available in four colourways, each featuring a different Moomin character. It was also released on 19 April 2019.

==== Season 2 ====
The second season includes nine original songs from artists such as Cavetown, girl in red, Jesse Markin and jens. The official soundtrack album, created in collaboration with Sony Music Finland, was released on 10 April 2020 globally on the major streaming platforms (Spotify, Deezer, Apple Music, Google Play and Tidal).

== Episodes ==
=== Series overview ===
Series	Episodes	Originally released	
Series	Episodes	First released	Last released
Pilot	1	25 February 2019; 19 April 2019	
1	13	25 February 2019; 19 April 2019	28 April 2019; 20 May 2019
2	13	21 December 2019; 2 March 2020	13 April 2020; 27 April 2020
3	13	1 April 2022; 3 October 2022	
4	13	26 October 2024; 6 January 2025	

=== Pilot (2014) ===
English title	Finnish title	Original release date
"Moomins on the Riviera"	"Muumit Rivieralla"	10 October 2014; 4 February 2015

=== Season 1 (2019) ===
No. overall	No. in season	English title	Finnish title	Swedish title	Original release date
1	1	"Little My Moves In"	"Pikku Myy tuli taloon"	"Lilla My flyttar in"	25 February 2019; 19 April 2019
2	2	"The Spring Tune"	"Kevätlaulu"	"Vårvisan"	4 March 2019; 19 April 2019
3	3	"The Last Dragon In The World"	"Maailman viimeinen lohikäärme"	"Den sista draken i världen"	11 March 2019; 19 April 2019
4	4	"Moominsummer Madness"	"Kelluva teatteri"	"Den flytande teatern"	18 March 2019; 19 April 2019
5	5	"The Golden Tale"	"Kultainen häntä"	"Den gyllene svansen"	25 March 2019; 19 April 2019
6	6	"The Secret Of The Hattifatteners"	"Hattivattien saari"	"Hattifnattarnas ö"	1 April 2019; 19 April 2019
7	7	"Snufkin And The Park Keeper"	"Nuuskamuikkunen ja puistonvartija"	"Snusmumriken och parkvakten"	8 April 2019; 19 April 2019
8	8	"Monster Fish"	"Muumipapan kalajuttu"	"Monsterfisken"	15 April 2019; 19 April 2019
9	9	"Night Of The Groke"	"Yksin kotona"	"Ensam hemma"	22 April 2019; 27 April 2019
10	10	"Moominmamma's Maid"	"Muumimamman apulainen"	"Muminmammans hembiträde"	27 April 2019; 29 April 2019
11	11	"Ghost Story"	"Kummitustarina"	"Spökhistorien"	27 April 2019; 6 May 2019
12	12	"The Invisible Child"	"Näkymätön lapsi"	"Det osynliga barnet"	28 April 2019; 13 May 2019
13	13	"Midwinter Ancestor"	"Taikatalvi"	"Trollvinter"	28 April 2019; 20 May 2019

=== Season 2 (2019–2020) ===
The first two episodes of season two were screened at Finnkino cinemas in Finland on 2 February 2020, exactly a month before these episodes premiered on Yle TV2 and Yle Areena on 2 March 2020.

No. overall	No. in season	English title	Finnish title	Finland Swedish title	Original release date
14	1	"Moomin's Winter Follies"	"Latua, herra Virkkunen!"	"Vintervansinne"	21 December 2019; 2 March 2020
15	2	"The Fire Spirit"	"Nuuskamuikkunen ja tulenhenki"	"Snusmumriken och eldanden"	21 December 2019; 2 March 2020
16	3	"Moominpappa & Son"	"Muumipapan uusi yritys"	"Muminpappan och plikten"	21 December 2019; 2 March 2020
17	4	"Little My Moves Out"	"Kohtalokas pulloposti"	"Hjärta rimmar med smärta"	21 December 2019; 2 March 2020
18	5	"The Strange Case Of Mrs Fillyjonk"	"Rouva Vilijonkan katoamismysteeri"	"Fru Filifjonks mystiska försvinnande"	21 December 2019; 30 March 2020
19	6	"The Hobgoblin's Hat"	"Taikahattu"	"Den magiska hatten"	30 March 2020; 10 April 2020
20	7	"Thingumy and Bob"	"Tiuhti ja Viuhti"	"Tofslan och Vifslan"	30 March 2020; 10 April 2020
21	8	"The Trial"	"Omituinen oikeudenkäynti"	"Den rysande rättegången"	30 March 2020; 11 April 2020
22	9	"Farewell, Snorkmaiden"	"Jäähyväiset Niiskuneidille"	"Farväl Snorkfröken"	11 April 2020; 27 April 2020
23	10	"Moominpappa's Island"	"Muumipapan saari"	"Muminpappans ö"	12 April 2020; 27 April 2020
24	11	"Moominmamma's Mural"	"Muumimamman muraali"	"Muminmamman längtar hem"	12 April 2020; 27 April 2020
25	12	"Moomintroll and the Seahorses"	"Muumipeikko ja merihevoset"	"Mumintrollet och sjöhästarna"	13 April 2020; 27 April 2020
26	13	"November"	"Muumilaakson marraskuu"	"November"	13 April 2020; 27 April 2020

=== Season 3 (2022) ===
No. overall	No. in season	English title	Finnish title	Finland Swedish title	Original release date
27	1	"Homecoming"	"Kotona jälleen!"	"Hemkomsten"	1 April 2022; 3 October 2022
28	2	"Moomintroll's Grand Adventure"	"Muumipeikon suuri seikkailu"	"Mumintrollets stora äventyr"	1 April 2022; 3 October 2022
29	3	"Brisk and Breezy"	"Leirinjohtaja Virkkunen"	"Herr Brisk sätts på prov"	1 April 2022; 3 October 2022
30	4	"Inventing Snork"	"Niisku löytää ystävän"	"Snorken får en vän"	1 April 2022; 3 October 2022
31	5	"The Stinky Caper"	"Haisulin kopla"	"Stinky och Muminligan"	1 April 2022; 3 October 2022
32	6	"Toffle's Tall Tales"	"Tuhton hurjat tarinat"	"Tofts hisnande historiet"	1 April 2022; 3 October 2022
33	7	"Winter Secrets"	"Talvisia salaisuuksia"	"Vinterhemligheter"	1 April 2022; 3 October 2022
34	8	"Lonely Mountain"	"Yksinäisten vuorten seikkailu"	"Äventyr i Ensliga Bergen"	1 April 2022; 3 October 2022
35	9	"Mrs Fillyjonk's Last Hurrah"	"Vilijonkan viimeiset villitykset"	"Fru Filifjonk släpper loss"	1 April 2022; 3 October 2022
36	10	"Snufkin and the Fairground"	"Nuuskamuikkunen ja huvipuisto"	"Snusmumriken och nöjesfältet"	1 April 2022; 3 October 2022
37	11	"Call of the Hattifatteners"	"Hattivattien kutsu"	"På jakt efter hattifnattens gnista"	1 April 2022; 3 October 2022
38	12	"Moominmamma's Flying Dream"	"Muumimamman lentävä unelma"	"Muminmammans flygande dröm"	1 April 2022; 3 October 2022
39	13	"Midsummer Magic"	"Juhannuksen taikaa"	"Midsommarmagi"	1 April 2022; 3 October 2022

=== Season 4 (2024) ===
Gutsy Animations announced in early 2023 that anchor broadcasters Sky (UK) and Yle (Finland) have recommissioned the Moominvalley series for a fourth season. For Season 4 the Viaplay Group has partnered as co-producer and will air all four seasons on its streaming platform in multiple territories including Sweden, Norway, Denmark, Poland, and the Netherlands. Season 4 had 12 22-minute episodes, along with a 45-minute series finale.

No. overall	No. in season	English title	Finnish title	Finland Swedish title	Original release date
40	1	"Ringmaster Brisk"	"Sirkustirehtööri Virkkunen"	"Cirkusdirektör Brisk"	26 October 2024; 6 January 2025
41	2	"Moomins and the Railway"	"Muumit ja rautatie"	"Mumin och järnvägen"	29 October 2024; 6 January 2025
42	3	"Sniff's Cave"	"Nipsun luola"	"Sniff och skatterna"	30 October 2024; 6 January 2025
43	4	"Seamaiden"	"Merineito"	"Sjöfröken"	31 October 2024; 6 January 2025
44	5	"Inspector Stinky"	"Poliisimestari Haisuli"	"Polismästare Stinky"	1 November 2024; 6 January 2025
45	6	"Midsummer Meddling"	"Kesäyön kommelluksia"	"Midsommarsvärmeri"	4 November 2024; 6 January 2025
46	7	"Moominmamma the Artist"	"Taiteilija Muumimamma"	"Muminmamman och konsten"	5 November 2024; 6 January 2025
47	8	"The Great Cold"	"Hyytävä kylmyys"	"Den stora kölden"	6 November 2024; 6 January 2025
48	9	"Moominpappa the Great Explorer"	"Muumipappa, suuri seikkailija"	"Muminpappan och hjältedåden"	7 November 2024; 6 January 2025
49	10	"Song of the Groke"	"Mörön laulu"	"Mårrans sång"	8 November 2024; 6 January 2025
50	11	"Moominpappa and Aunt Jane"	"Muumipappa ja Hemulitäti"	"Muminpappan och Tant Hemulen"	11 November 2024; 6 January 2025
51	12	"Starstruck"	"Lumoava tähti"	"Skrivet i stjärnorna"	12 November 2024; 6 January 2025
52	13	"The Comet"	"Pyrstötähti"	"Kometen"	13 November 2024; 6 January 2025

== International broadcast ==
Moominvalley has been sold to more than 60 countries. Moominvalley first aired on Yle TV2 in Finland on 25 February 2019, and a day after in Swedish on Yle Teema & Fem. It began airing in the United Kingdom on Sky One, Sky Kids and NOW TV on 19 April 2019. The first eight episodes aired overnight between 2:00 and 6:00 am, and were then repeated in pairs between 5:30 and 6:30 pm over the Easter weekend from 19 to 22 April. Episodes 9–11 followed on the afternoon of 27 April, and 12–13 on 28 April. The first five episodes of season 2 aired over the weekend before Christmas 2019, with the remainder broadcast over the following Easter weekend, 10–13 April 2020. Japan's national broadcaster NHK premiered Moominvalley on its BS4K channel on 4 April 2019. The series has also been sold to China. On 9 August 2019 it launched on WildBrain's YouTube channel. In November 2020 it was announced that Moominvalley had been recommissioned for a third season by anchor broadcasters Yle in Finland and Sky in the UK. The first eight episodes aired on Sky Showcase in pairs from Good Friday 2022 (15 April) until Easter Monday (18 April), with the remainder scheduled, also in pairs until the final episode, for subsequent Sundays.

On 1 May 2019 PGS Entertainment acquired the distribution rights to Moominvalley. On 5 October 2023, it was announced that Zodiak Kids & Family Distribution had acquired the distribution rights to Moominvalley.

In the United Kingdom, the series also airs on BBC Alba and S4C as part of their CBBC Alba and Stwnsh blocks, where it is dubbed in Scottish Gaelic and Welsh respectively.

== Reception ==
=== Ratings ===
The series has been extremely successful in its reviews and ratings worldwide. The first episode of Moominvalley was viewed by 600,000 viewers when it premiered on Finland's Yle TV2 in February 2019. It also became the most watched television series episode of all time on Yle's streaming service, Yle Areena, bringing the total viewership of the first episode in Finland to over two million. Moominvalley was the most watched TV series and the fourth most watched TV programme in Finland in 2019, across all channels.

=== Awards ===
Year	Award	Category	Result
2019	Shanghai TV Festival Magnolia Awards	Best Animation & Best Storytelling	Nominated
2019	TBI Content Innovation Awards	Best animated kids programme	Won
2019	Golden Venla	Best Children and Youth Programme	Won
2020	British Animation Awards	Best Children's Series	Won
2020	BANFF Rockie Awards	Children and Youth: Animation	Nominated
2020	9th International Emmy Kids Awards	Kids: Animation	Nominated
2020	Cyber Sousa -Xiamen International Animation Festival	Best Animated Series	Nominated
2020	JIFF	Animation Short	Nominated
2020	Golden Venla	Best Children and Youth Programme	Won
2021	Annecy	TV Films in Competition	Nominated
2022	British Animation Awards	Best voice performance (Bel Powley)	Nominated
2022	New York International Children's Film Festival	Audience Episodic Award	Won
2022	RTS West of England Awards	Best Sound	Won
2022	TBI Content Innovation Awards	Best Children's Programme	Won
2022	Golden Venla	Best Children and Youth Programme	Nominated
2023	50th Annie Awards	Best Animated Television Production for Children	Nominated
2023	Shanghai TV Festival Magnolia Awards	Best Animation	Won
2023	Golden Panda	Best Animated Image	Won
2023	51st International Emmy Awards	Kids: Animation	Nominated
2025	53rd International Emmy Awards	Kids: Animation	Nominated

In 2019 Moominvalley was awarded the Best Animated Kid's Programme at TBI's Content Innovation Awards. The series also won a Golden Venla award in 2019 for Best Children's Program, and won Best Children's Series at the 2020 British Animation Awards. Moominvalley was nominated for Best Animation and Best Storytelling at the 2019 Shanghai Television Festival. In 2020 Moominvalley was a New York International Children's Film Festival nominee and was additionally nominated in the "Children and Youth: Animation" category of the Banff Rockie Awards. Moominvalley was shortlisted for the Broadcast Digital Awards in 2020 and selected for Encounters' Film Festival's competition programme in the same year. It was nominated for an International Emmy Kids Award. In 2020 Moominvalley was nominated for Best Children's Program in Golden Venla Awards for the second year in a row.
