= Tiensuu =

Tiensuu is a Finnish surname. Notable people with the surname include:

- Jukka Tiensuu (born 1948), Finnish composer, harpsichordist, pianist, and conductor
- Tuukka Tiensuu (born 1976), Finnish television director, writer and producer
