= Tuukka Tiensuu =

Finnish TV director, writer and producer (born 1976)

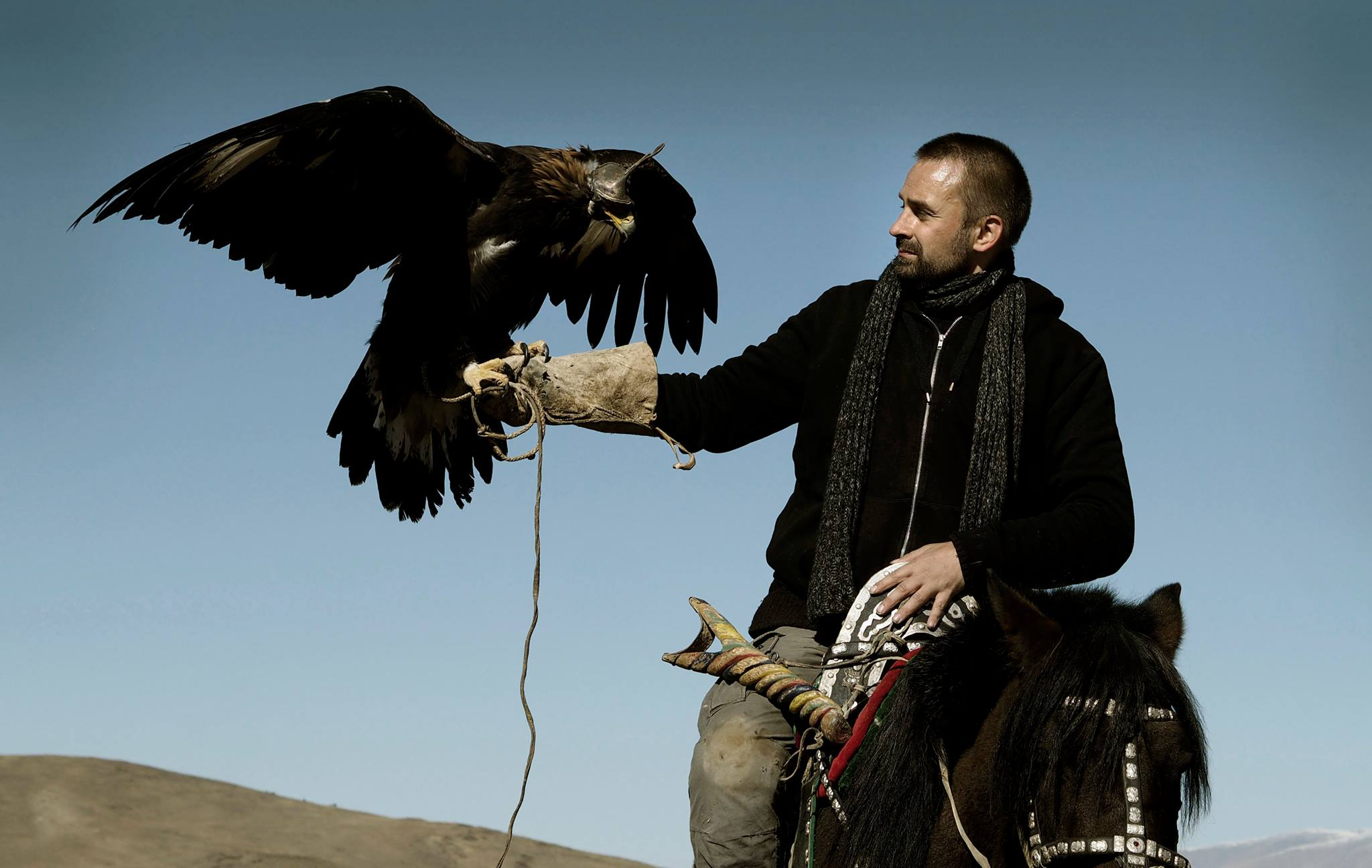
- Tiensuu in Western Mongolia (2015)
- Occupations: Director, screenwriter, producer
- Years active: 1999–present

Tuukka Tiensuu is a Finnish television director, writer and producer. He is best known for the internationally successful Finnish TV-series The Dudesons, Kill Arman,The Dudesons in America and Beyond Human Boundaries.

== Early career and MoonTV ==
Tiensuu started his directing career on MoonTV in 1999, and worked for the company until 2003. His directorial works for the channel include the fashion show Dresscode, the game shows Overdose and Play, the adult entertainment show Pornostara, and the literature show Kirjarovio.

== Rabbit Films and The Dudesons ==
In 2003 joined Rabbit Films and started working on the English-language version of the Finnish hit series Extreme Duudsonit. The name was eventually changed to The Dudesons and Tiensuu was a co-creator, writer, segment-director and editor on the show. The series was launched in 2006 and it quickly became the most internationally successful Finnish TV-series of all time, airing in over 150 countries and spawning four seasons.

In 2006 Tiensuu also worked as a co-creator, writer and a director of cinematography and editing in The Dudesons Movie, which was released theatrically in Finland. The film won the "Audience's Favorite movie award" in the Jussi-gaala 2006 (The Finnish Oscars).

In 2010 Tiensuu worked as a co-creator, producer, writer and a segment director in The Dudesons in America, an MTV USA series which was budgeted at 6 million dollars.

In 2015 Tiensuu was the main director on the 5th and final season of The Dudesons.

== Kill Arman ==
In 2008 Tiensuu created Kill Arman with Arman Alizad. This martial arts show spawned two seasons, written and directed by Tiensuu. It was distributed worldwide and it aired in over 100 countries. The series was nominated for the Best Finnish TV-show of the year in the 2010 Venla-gaala.

== Beyond Human Boundaries (Arman & Viimeinen Ristiretki) ==
in 2012 Tiensuu started directing an adventure show with Arman Alizad, Beyond Human Boundaries. The series follows Alizad as he lives in extreme conditions in the most remote places on earth. The series aired in over 50 countries around the world. It won the "best reality series of the year" at the Finnish Emmys, Venla-gala, in 2013. As of 2023, it has aired for 4 seasons, from 2013 to 2023. Tiensuu has said that it is key to the production that it is filmed with a small camera which does not look like a film camera, so people do not realise they are making a television programme.

== Other projects ==
Tiensuu has worked as a TV-commercial director for different production companies, such as Verse Productions, Rabbit Films and MoonTV. He has also directed music videos for Finnish artists such as Indica, Paleface and Petri Nygård.
