= Nikkanen =

Nikkanen is a Finnish surname. Notable people with the surname include:

- Kimmo Nikkanen, the first regular host of the free Finnish cable network channel Moon TV
- Marcus Nikkanen (1904–1985), Finnish figure skater
- Minna Nikkanen (born 1988), Finnish pole vaulter
- Yrjö Nikkanen (1914–1985), Finnish athlete
