= Jyrki (TV program) =

Finnish music television program

Jyrki (sometimes stylised as JYRK:.) is a Finnish music television program that aired on the MTV3 channel from 1995 to 2001. It was an afternoon program about popular music for youths. The idea for the program came from the Canadian MuchMusic program by the CHUM network, whose material Jyrki borrowed and cooperated with to improve the concept. Jyrki was produced by Funny-Films Oy.

== Overview ==
Jyrki began airing on 1 September 1995. It aired five days a week for one and a half hours and broadcast live from the Lasipalatsi in central Helsinki. When the Lasipalatsi was under renovation, the program was broadcast from Kalevankatu. The program consisted mostly of music videos and artist interviews. The last episode of Jyrki was on 21 December 2001. There were a total of 2901 episodes and they showed approximately four thousand music videos. The first music video shown on Jyrki was Veikko Lavi's "Löysin rantein". In the final years from 2000 to 2001, the program was also broadcast on the TVTV! channel (currently known as Sub).

Side shows of Jyrki included the dance music oriented Jyrki Electric Circus, the one-artist spotlight show Intimate & Interactive, the video list Jyrki Countdown, Jyrki Spotlight containing foreign artist interviews, Jyrki+ containing older music videos and interviews, the movie show Jyrki Goes Movies and the live music show Live@Jyrki. Also the traditional Finnish rock'n'roll championship was renamed "Jyrki Hit Challenge". The Jyrki Video Awards celebration rewarded the best music artists and music videos from 1997 to 2001.

The show brought many new faces to publicity. Hosts included Mikko Silvennoinen, Marika Makaroff, Raymond Ebanks, Vera Olsson, Jaana Pelkonen, Mikko "Peltsi" Peltola, Katja Ståhl, Micaela Metso, Veeti Kallio, Olli "Molli-Olli" Oikarinen, Minna O (Ojala/Ottavainen), Joonas Hytönen, Tiina Kylmälä, Heta Hyttinen, Tea Khalifa, Jussi Heikelä, and the editor-in-chief Antti "Pizza" Pekkarinen.

From December 2005, Pan Vision started publicising the best interviews and live performances of Jyrki on DVD under the title of Jyrki: Lost Tapes. The program was planned to consist of six episodes, but it was stopped after the third episode, which consisted of live performances from autumn 1997 to spring 1998.
