= Dresscode (TV series) =

- Genre: Fashion / documentary
- Created by: Vera Olsson; Arman Alizad; Tuukka Tiensuu
- Starring: Arman Alizad
- Country of origin: Finland
- Original language: Finnish
- No. of seasons: 3
- No. of episodes: 45

Production
- Running time: Season 1 approx. 24 min, Season 2 approx. 24 min Season 3 approx. 24 min

Original release
- Network: MoonTV
- Release: 2001

Dresscode was a Finnish fashion TV-series airing on MoonTV. It was hosted by master tailor Arman Alizad. The series run for three seasons, from 2001 to 2003.

== Synopsis ==
Dresscode took a very diverse approach to fashion, and was considered by many to be more of a lifestyle-show. It covered very varied subjects like clothing, jewelry, interior design, etiquette, food, drinks, cars, and even guns.

== Cast and characters ==
The series was hosted by Arman Alizad, a Finnish master tailor, who also developed several alter egos for the show. Alizad was sometimes co-hosted by Teresa Ackalin. Alizad later became internationally famous for the martial arts series Kill Arman.

== Production ==
The series was directed by Tuukka Tiensuu and produced by Vera Olsson. It was an in-house production for MoonTV.
