= Levyraati =

Finnish musical game show

- Levyraati in 1984
- Genre: Music
- Presented by: Jaakko Jahnukainen (1961–1980); Vesa Nuotio (1980); Jukka Virtanen (1980–1997); Raakel Lignell (2002–2003); Ruben Stiller (2003–2005); Jenni Pääskysaari (2024)
- Country of origin: Finland
- Original language: Finnish
- No. of episodes: 101

Production
- Production locations: Pasila, Helsinki, Finland
- Running time: 60 minutes

Original release
- Network: TES-TV (1961–1964); MTV (1964–1992); MTV3 (1992–1997, 2002–2005, 2024)

Levyraati ("Record Panel") is a Finnish television show which ran from the 1961–1992 originally on YLE and starting from 1992 on MTV3. It is based on the British Juke Box Jury.

The show was originally hosted by Jaakko Jahnukainen and for a brief period by Vesa Nuotio (in 1980). However, the show was most famously hosted by Jukka Virtanen from 1980 till 1997 when the show went on a five-year hiatus. For its 2002–2003 run it was hosted by Raakel Lignell and later by Ruben Stiller. The show has been on unspecified hiatus since 2005.

In the program Finnish celebrities (mostly musicians) would rate recordings and, in later years, music videos with a score from 1 to 10. With four guests in the panel the maximum score was 40 and the winning song or video would be performed during the ending credits. One of the panel members was a frequent guest placed among three weekly guests.

Today Levyraati has also become a popular game practiced amongst friends and family who form the panel and play music from personal collections. The rating-system varies.

In 2023, channel MTV3 revealed that the program would make its return in January 2024, and the version premiered on 20 January. The new presenter is Jenni Pääskysaari, with regular panelists Asko Kallonen, Lina Schiffer, Väinö Karjalainen (son of J. Karjalainen) and Mikko Kosonen.

== Similar programmes ==
- Videoraati, MoonTV's take on the popular format, hosted by Wallu Valpio.
- Runoraati was a version of the show on YLE in which a panel rates poems sent by amateur poets.
