= Jarno Sarkula =

Finnish musician (1973–2020)

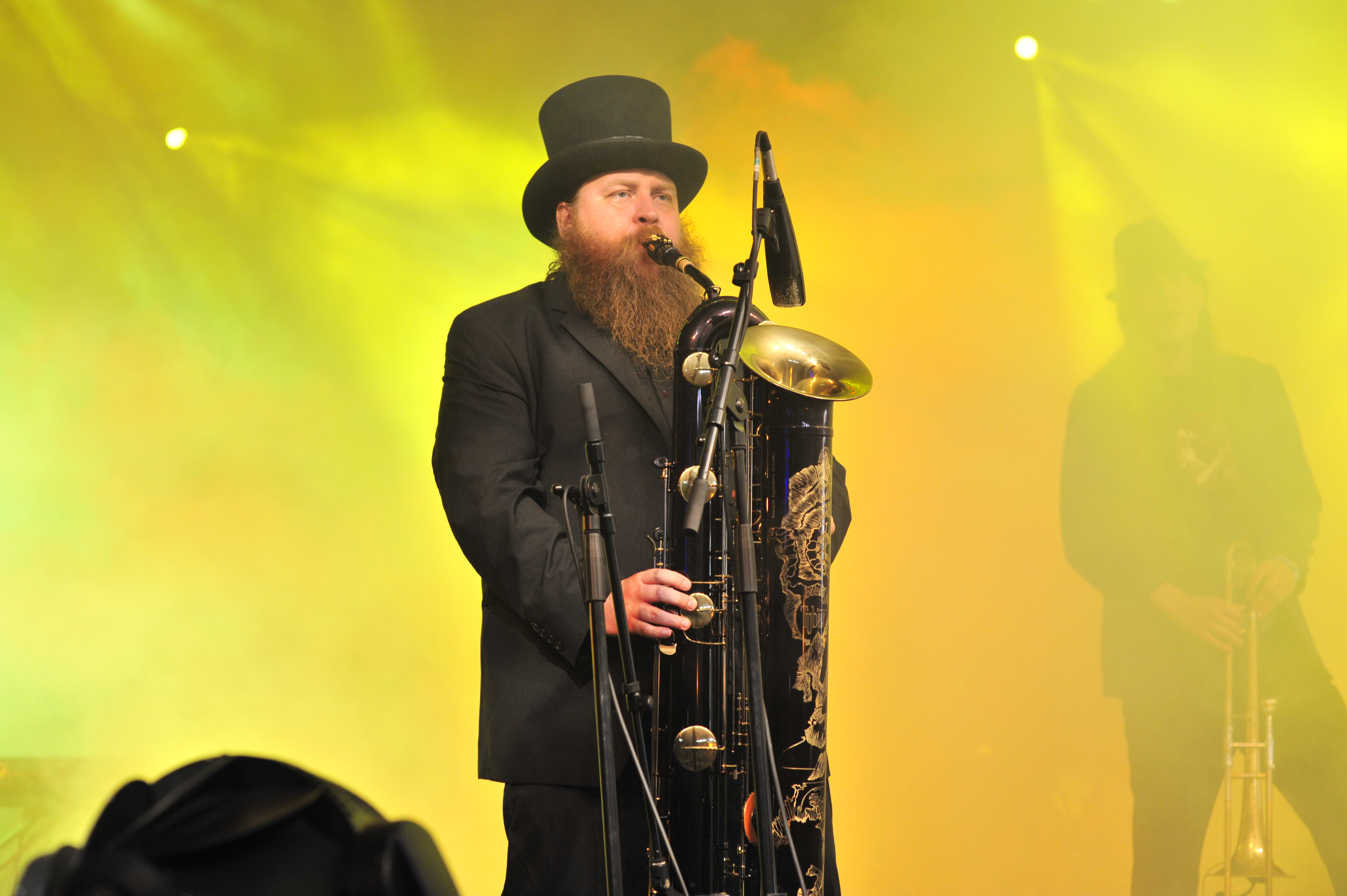
- Jarno Sarkula performing with Alamaailman Vasarat at the Roskilde Festival in 2009

Background information
- Born: 8 April 1973; Vantaa, Finland
- Origin: Helsinki, Finland
- Died: 12 July 2020 (aged 47) Coimbra, Portugal
- Occupation(s): musician, songwriter, tv personality
- Years active: 1991–2014

Jarno Sarkula (4 August 1973 – 12 July 2020) was a Finnish musician and one-time TV-personality.

Sarkula was born in Vantaa. As a musician, he first became known with the band Höyry-kone ("Steam-Engine"). Sarkula wrote music for the band and played the bass and woodwinds. The music of the band took influences from e.g. the opera. In 1997, Sarkula founded the band Alamaailman Vasarat together with Teemu Hänninen. After developing the band's music for a couple of years, they began to play in public. The band took its influences from jazz, classical music, rock and klezmer. The result can be categorized as world music, and the band said that they played music from the fictitious continent of Vasaraasia. The band played concerts in e.g. the Nordic countries, the Netherlands, France, Mexico and Japan. They achieved their greatest fame in 2005, when they recorded the album Kinaporin Kalifaatti together with the Finnish artist Tuomari Nurmio.

Sarkula also became known as a TV-persona on the free cable-channel MoonTV. Sarkula started out as the host of PC game-oriented shows such as PC-Peliluola (PC "Game Cave", a name for an arcade), his best known program, and the in-depth gaming show PC-Planeetta (PC-Planet) which was split from the show Game Planet, after it was divided into two shows.

He also hosted the show Damage which dealt with DVD-releases and was one of the last 15-minute shows on the channel.

On screen Sarkula went by the name Kreivi Stakula (Count Stakula) which went hand-in-hand with the gothic look of the show. Despite his unshakable demeanor Sarkula entertained audiences with his verbal acrobatics which often had gothic undertones and even by doing skits relating to games he was reviewing (while reviewing Serious Sam he did an imitation of the Headless Screaming creatures in the game). Sarkula quickly became one of the channel's best liked hosts.

The name Stakula was originally a goof on the part of a French stage-manager who misspelled Sarkula's name when he was touring with Alamaailman Vasarat. The name stuck and Sarkula would often go by this alias in almost all of the shows he hosted. After the end of MoonTV however Sarkula did not follow his fellow hosts by going to work on other channels (like YLE, MTV3, Nelonen or SubTV) but instead decided to concentrate on his musical career.

Stakula made several guest-appearances on the Game Review-show Play (sharing a title with a show which aired on MoonTV) on Nelonen which was hosted and maintained by his former MoonTV co-workers Thomas Puha, Miika Huttunen and Elias Poutanen.

He owned Stakula OY Audio Visual productions.

In 2014, Sarkula moved to Berlin and started working on a solo album.

Sarkula died in Coimbra, Portugal, on 12 July 2020.
