= Dimitris Kapsanis =

Greek lawyer and politician

Dimitris Kapsanis while he was mayor of Palaio Faliro

Dimitris Kapsanis is a Greek lawyer and politician who served four times as the mayor of Palaio Faliro, one of the municipalities in the greater Athens area in Greece.

Dimitris Kapsanis was born in Palaio Faliro in 1939. He studied law at the University of Athens and became a lawyer. Apart from the law, his interests were painting and local government.

In 1970, the elected mayor of Palaio Faliro, Nicholas Psarrakis, was forced to resign by the military junta then ruling Greece. After the collapse of the junta, a new acting mayor D. Bavarezos took over in September 1974, remaining until the elections, while Psarrakis returned as deputy mayor in October. Kapsanis swept the 1975 elections with 50.5% of the vote and assumed the mayoralty on 6 April 1975. He was re-elected in 1978 and 1982, with 56.3% in 1978 rising to 57.4% in 1982.

Palaio Phaliro faced multiple problems at this time as a consequence of a dramatic population increase. As mayor, he undertook projects to improve the living environment, such as new roads, schools, sports facilities, public squares, and cultural events and institutions. During his second term the Municipal Library was established and, also, the Municipal Sports Centre located in the St. George area.

After these three terms he was succeeded by George Chrysoveridis in 1987.

When George Chrysoveridis retired, he made a comeback winning the 1998 mayoral election, gaining 52.3% in the second round, at the head of the Independent Alliance "Faliro". One of the main issues remained the construction of a town hall, for which Kapsanis had announced an architectural competition in his previous term. However, this problem was not finally resolved until 2006, during the term of Hatzidakis.

In the municipal elections of 2002 he was knocked out in the first round, coming third with 21.7%, while Dionysis Hatzidakis went on to be elected in the second round with 53.6%, at the head of the alliance named "New Force for Faliro".

He continued for several years as a member of the Town Council of Palaio Faliro until 2010.
