= Palaio Faliro =

Town in the Athens urban area, Greece

Palaio Faliro Παλαιό Φάληρο
- Municipality
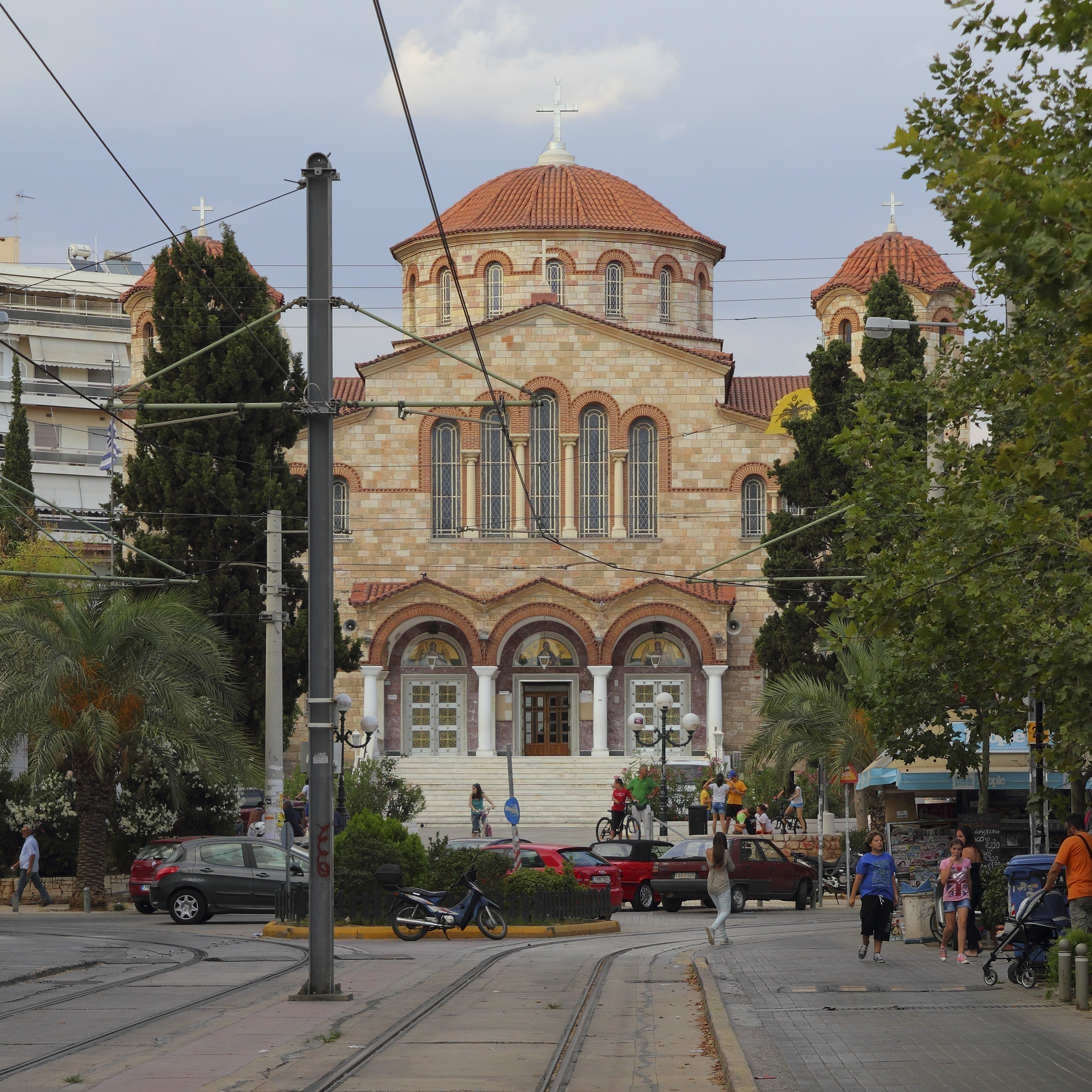
- The church of the Virgin (Panagitsa)

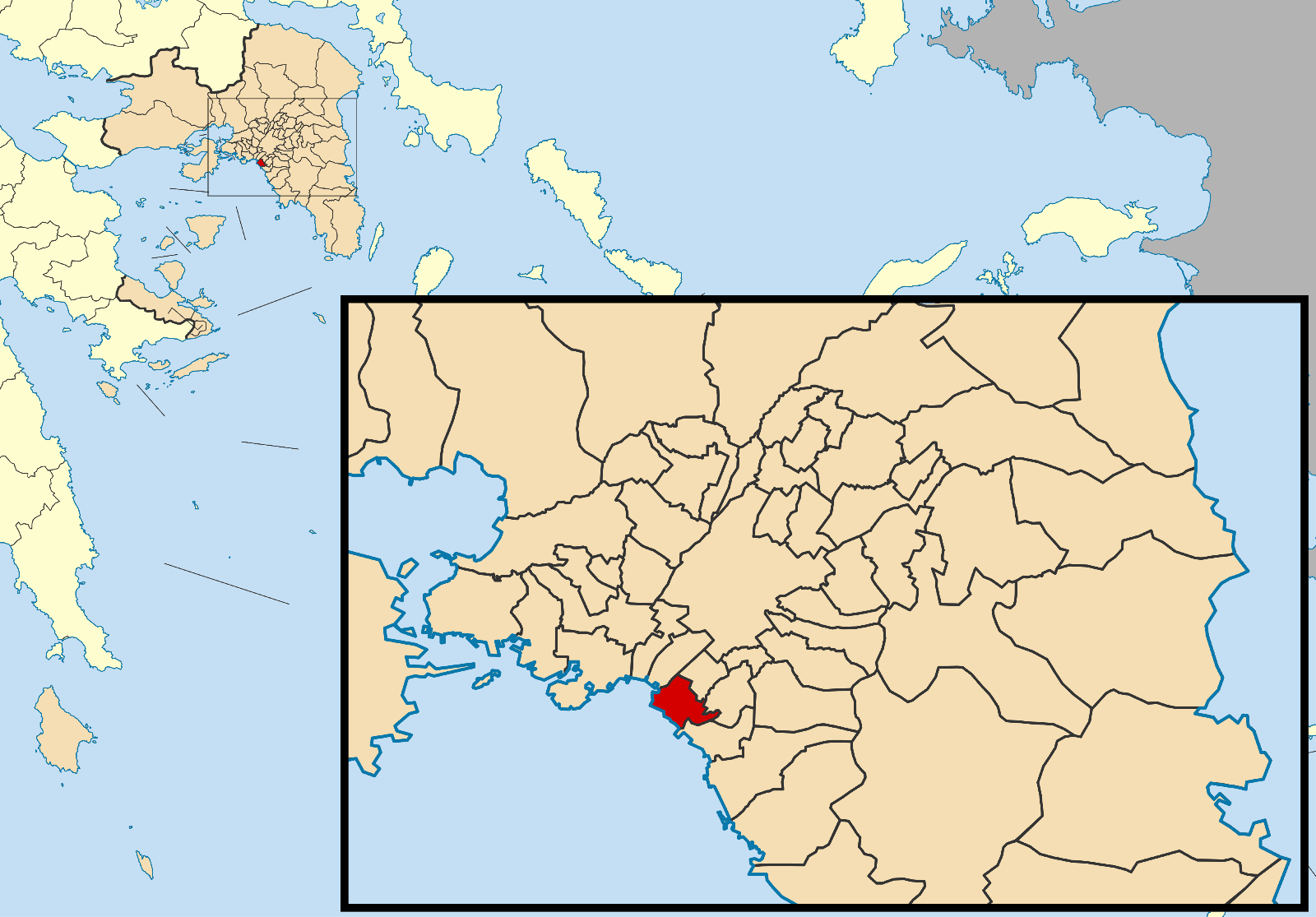

- Location within Greece
- Coordinates: 37°56′N 23°42′E
- Country: Greece
- Administrative region: Attica
- Regional unit: South Athens

Government
  - Mayor: Ioannis Fostiropoulos (since 2019)

Area
  - Municipality: 4.574 km^{2} (1.766 sq mi)
- Elevation: 5 m (16 ft)

Population (2021)
  - Municipality: 64,863
  - Density: 14,180/km^{2} (36,730/sq mi)
- Time zone: UTC+2 (EET)
  - Summer (DST): UTC+3 (EEST)
- Postal code: 175 61 - 175 64
- Area code: 210
- Vehicle registration: Z
- Website: palaiofaliro.gr

Palaio Faliro (Greek: Παλαιό Φάληρο, pronounced [paleˈo ˈfaliro]; Katharevousa: Palaion Faliron, Παλαιόν Φάληρον, meaning "Old Phalerum") is a town on the Saronic Gulf coast and a municipality in the southern part of the Athens agglomeration, Greece. At the 2021 census it had 64,863 inhabitants.

== Geography ==
Palaio Faliro is situated on the east coast of the Phalerum Bay, a bay of the Saronic Gulf, 6 km southwest of Athens city centre. The municipality has an area of 4.574 km^{2}. It is surrounded by other districts of Athens: Kallithea, Nea Smyrni, Agios Dimitrios and Alimos. The Pikrodafni stream flows into sea on the border of Palaio Faliro and Alimos. Palaio Faliro is at the northwestern end of what is referred to as the Athens Riviera.

The Faliro coast was redeveloped for the 2004 Summer Olympics, and now contains a seaside promenade, several sports venues, a marina and the Naval Tradition Park, where museum ships are exhibited.

The neighbourhoods of Palaio Faliro are Amfithea, Batis, Edem, Panagitsa, Floisvos, Palmyra, Pikrodafni, Agia Varvara and Kopsachila.

== Climate ==
Palaio Faliro located in the Athens Riviera, has a hot semi-arid climate (Köppen climate classification: BSh), closely bordering a hot-summer mediterranean (Csa) climate. It has mild winters and hot summers, with particularly warm summer nights.

Climate data for Palaio Faliro 25 m a.s.l.
Month	Jan	Feb	Mar	Apr	May	Jun	Jul	Aug	Sep	Oct	Nov	Dec	Year
Record high °C (°F)	21.4 (70.5)	22.4 (72.3)	24.7 (76.5)	30.5 (86.9)	33.6 (92.5)	38.9 (102.0)	39.3 (102.7)	42.5 (108.5)	36.4 (97.5)	31.3 (88.3)	26.2 (79.2)	22.3 (72.1)	42.5 (108.5)
Mean daily maximum °C (°F)	14.5 (58.1)	15.7 (60.3)	17.5 (63.5)	21.1 (70.0)	25.1 (77.2)	29.9 (85.8)	33.4 (92.1)	33.5 (92.3)	29.1 (84.4)	24.3 (75.7)	20.1 (68.2)	15.9 (60.6)	23.3 (74.0)
Daily mean °C (°F)	11.6 (52.9)	12.8 (55.0)	14.4 (57.9)	17.8 (64.0)	21.9 (71.4)	26.4 (79.5)	29.8 (85.6)	29.9 (85.8)	25.8 (78.4)	21.1 (70.0)	17.2 (63.0)	13.1 (55.6)	20.2 (68.3)
Mean daily minimum °C (°F)	8.7 (47.7)	9.9 (49.8)	11.3 (52.3)	14.5 (58.1)	18.6 (65.5)	22.9 (73.2)	26.2 (79.2)	26.4 (79.5)	22.5 (72.5)	17.9 (64.2)	14.3 (57.7)	10.3 (50.5)	17.0 (62.5)
Record low °C (°F)	−0.4 (31.3)	0.1 (32.2)	2.1 (35.8)	5.7 (42.3)	12.8 (55.0)	16.2 (61.2)	20.1 (68.2)	20.5 (68.9)	15.9 (60.6)	11.8 (53.2)	7.4 (45.3)	1.6 (34.9)	−0.4 (31.3)
Average rainfall mm (inches)	54.4 (2.14)	45.8 (1.80)	36.9 (1.45)	17.1 (0.67)	14.8 (0.58)	24.6 (0.97)	5.2 (0.20)	4.3 (0.17)	29.5 (1.16)	38.4 (1.51)	62.6 (2.46)	68.4 (2.69)	402 (15.8)
Source: National Observatory of Athens Monthly Bulletins (May 2012 - May 2024), World Meteorological Organization

== History ==
The conventions for writing and Romanizing Ancient Greek and Modern Greek differ markedly, which can create confusion. Thus the Greek name Φάληρον (Phaleron) can appear in various forms in English (Phalerum, Faliro, etc.), according to the historical context, disguising the fact that it is the same word.

Phaleron was an important place in antiquity, then as now one of the demes of Athens; however, a precise definition of its Classical topography is lacking, although the location of the deme is well established. Pausanias records that it was on the coast, equidistant from Athens and Cape Kolias (i.e., Ayios Kosmas) at 20 stadia. Strabo enumerates the coastal demes east of Piraeus and starts with Phaleron. The site of the ancient town appears to be the area and headland around the church of St. George, with the harbour to the west in the open roadstead. Remains of conglomerate blocks have been found crossing the heights of Old Phaleron to the sea and these are likely to be part of the Phaleric Wall recorded by Thucydides.

Before the 5th century B.C., Phaleron was the port of Athens, as it is least distant from the city. Thus the Athenians sailing to Troy would have departed from Phaleron. But Themistocles, when he became preeminent in the government of the Athenians, arranged that Piraeeus be the main port, as it was more convenient for seafarers.

Pausanias, in the Roman period, notes that Phaleron contained an altar to the unknown god (by the Temple of Zeus in Phaleron), which was referred to by St. Paul when he visited Athens. In the reign of the emperor Justinian, Stephanus of Byzantium, in his geographical dictionary Ethnica, records Phaleron as a deme and port of Attica.

Map of Phaleron, 1843, showing the sites of the ancient deme and the ancient walls, as well as contemporary features

Throughout the period of Frankish rule, which followed the Roman-Byzantine empire, Athens was confined within the late Roman walls, and the area beyond became a wasteland.

In the Ottoman period, the port was known as Porto Vecchio (old port) and its harbour was located near the church of St. George, once a chapel dedicated to St. Nicholas. The harbour also had the name Skala of St. Nicholas. In 1674 the English Consul in Athens, Jean Giraud, called this location "Three Towers" or Tripyrgi, a place-name that was retained into the 19th century. Most likely the name was created in medieval times because of the presence of ancient ruins in this area.

The Battle of Phaleron took place in May 1827 as part of an ill-fated action to relieve the Greeks besieged in the Acropolis during the Greek War of Independence. Greek troops landed around the Three Towers area and advanced on the Acropolis but the expedition ended in disaster and the fortress capitulated in June.

The area came to be known as old Phaleron in the later 19th century, following the development of the settlement of Neo Phaleron in 1850–1860, now a suburb of Piraeus. Before 1920 old Phaleron was a small seaside village where the houses were few and between which there were long stretches of wheat, barley and oats as well as many vineyards. Some of the men were fishermen, but most were farmers, shepherds and stock breeders. In 1883 the first public transport connecting old Phaleron with Athens was inaugurated, a horse-drawn tram line. In 1890 steam trams were introduced and it was later electrified.

In the western 'Delta' area a sea plane airport was started in August 1926, with the first international route Brindisi - Faliro - Istanbul. In the 20th century there was a rapid growth in population, reflected in upgrades in municipal government (see below).

Many Greeks from Istanbul (Constantinople) came to live in Palaio Faliro, especially after 1974, and now form a very active and prominent community.

In January 2005, a 1.8-meter-tall marble torso of a young man was found in the Pikrodafni streambed at the intersections of Pikrodafnis and Dimokratias Streets. The statue dates back to the 1st century A.D. and was a copy of a 4th-century B.C. classical original that may depict Apollo Lykeios. It was said the statue could have been recently discovered by builders during construction work and dumped in the streambed for fear archaeologists might stop the works if alerted to the find.

During the 2000s, especially during the Summer Olympics 2004, Palaio Faliro saw major improvements in its infrastructure, such as the establishment of the Tram Line 3 that serves the southern coastal area of Athens.

A waterfront parkland area is being created at the Faliro Delta, named Aenaon Park, with an expected completion date of 2028.

=== Historical population ===
Year	Population
1920	2,245
1928	7,110
1940	8,302
1951	12,894
1961	22,157
1971	35,066
1981	53,273
1991	61,371
2001	64,759
2011	64,069
2021	64,863

== Municipality ==
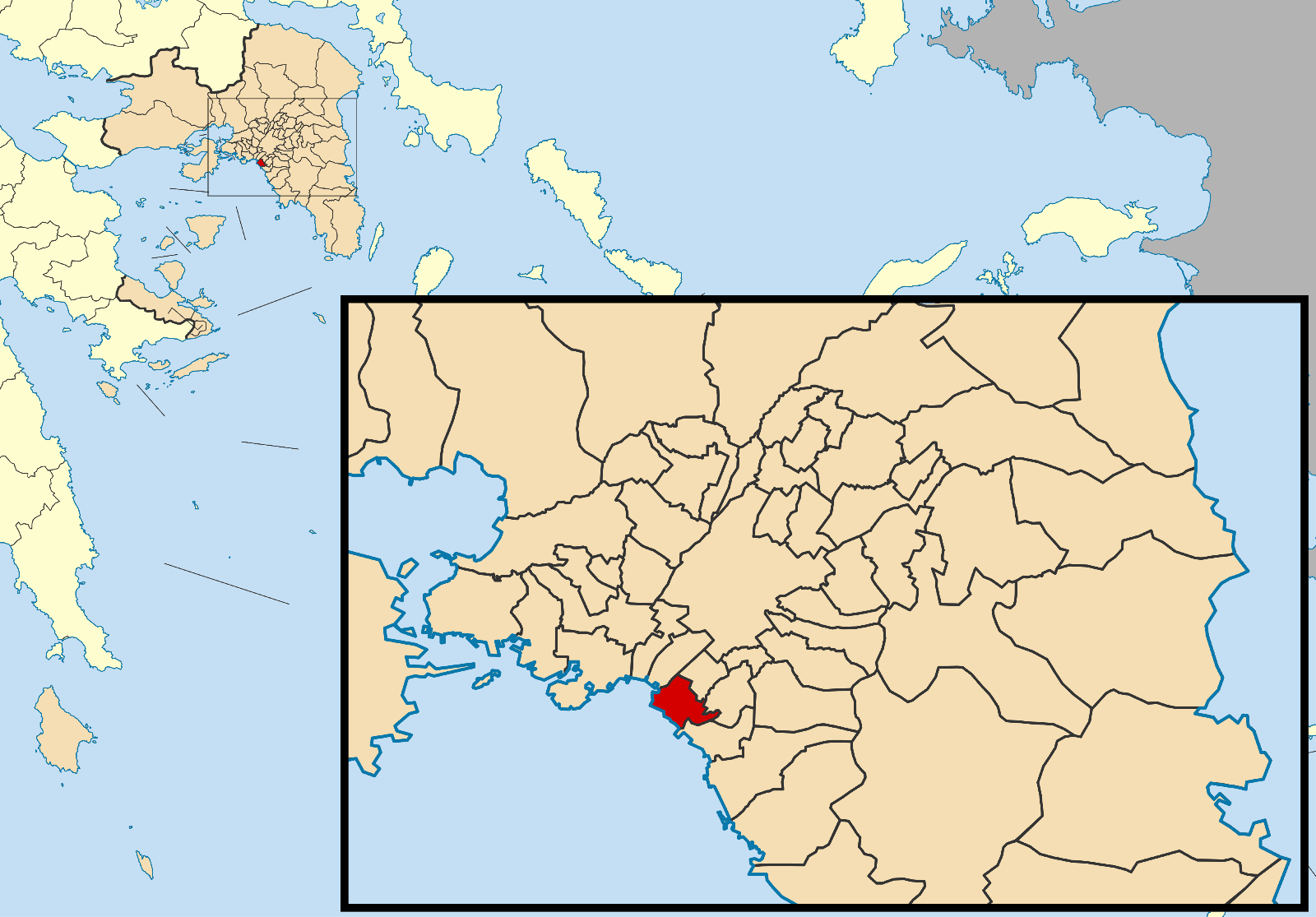
Palaio Faliro Municipality

In 1925 Palaio Faliro was established as a local government Community (i.e. civil parish or township) with the Presidential Decree 27/8/1925.

In 1942, Palaio Faliro, together with Kalamaki, became a municipality, with K. Toufexí̱s as the first mayor. Kalamaki (now in Alimos municipality) was separated in 1945.

Mayors of Palaio Faliro

- K. Toufexis (1/9/1942 - 28/1/1945)
- K. Ntaí̱s (29/1/1945 - 11/2/1946)
- A. Magriplí̱s (11/2/1946 - 11/4/1946)
- K. Ntaí̱s (11/4/1946 - 17/6/1946)
- I. Ntávari̱s (17/6/1946 - 9/8/1950)
- G Sakellaríou (17/8/1950 - 24/5/1951)
- I. Láppas (24/5/1951 - 9/6/1959)
- N. Psarráki̱s (9/6/1959 - 25/5/1970)
- E. Zi̱simopoúlou (29/5/1970 - 13/7/1970)
- S. Vlachópoulos (13/7/1970 - 17/9/1974)
- G. Chronópoulos (17/9/1974 - 24/9/1974)
- D. Bavarézos (24/9/1974 - 6/4/1975)
- D. Kapsanis (6/4/1975 - 31/12/1986)
- G. Chrysoverídis (1/1/1987 - 31/12/1998)
- D. Kapsanis (1/1/1999 - 31/12/2002)
- D. Hatzidakis (1/1/2003 - 31/8/2019)
- I. Fostiropoulos (1/9/2019 - )

The municipal council has 41 members.

In the municipal election of 2014, the seats achieved by each party were as follows:

- 27 seats - New Force for Phaleron (New Democracy), aligned with mayor Dionysis Hajidakis
- 6 seats - Radical Left (SYRIZA)
- 3 seats – Independent Municipal Force with Phaleron
- 2 seats – Democratic Rally
- 2 seats – We for Phaleron
- 2 seats – Greek Dawn

== Transport ==
The main avenues of Palaio Faliro are the seaside Poseidonos Avenue, which connects it with the port of Piraeus and the other southern suburbs, and the Andrea Syngrou Avenue respectively, which connects Palaio Faliro with the central Athens. Palaio Faliro is served by the Tram and by Buses. Palaio Faliro has a direct connection to the Athens International Airport via its express bus line X96. A new pedestrian overpass is planned to cross Poseidonos Avenue at Aphrodite Road.

== Landmarks ==
The Flisvos Public Park at Palaio Faliro, next to the Marina of Flisvos, is a common destination for cultural activities and public events in Palaio Faliro, as well as a place for relaxation for the local population and tourists. It is located just next to the sea beach and provides benches and ample space for jogging or gymnastics.

Other landmarks include:

- Cultural Centre of Palaio Faliro
- Marina of Flisvos
- Saint Mary church (Panagitsa)
- Naval Tradition Park, including the historical warships Georgios Averof, Velos and the replica of the ancient Athenian trireme Olympias.
- Phaleron Allied War Cemetery
- The Evgenidio Foundation (better known as: The Athenian Planetarium)
- Parts of the Faliro Coastal Zone Olympic Complex, such as the Faliro Sports Pavilion Arena, that were intended for the usage for the 2004 Summer Olympics
- National Historical Museum of the Hellenic Air Force
- Phylax Statue
- Aenaon Park (under construction)
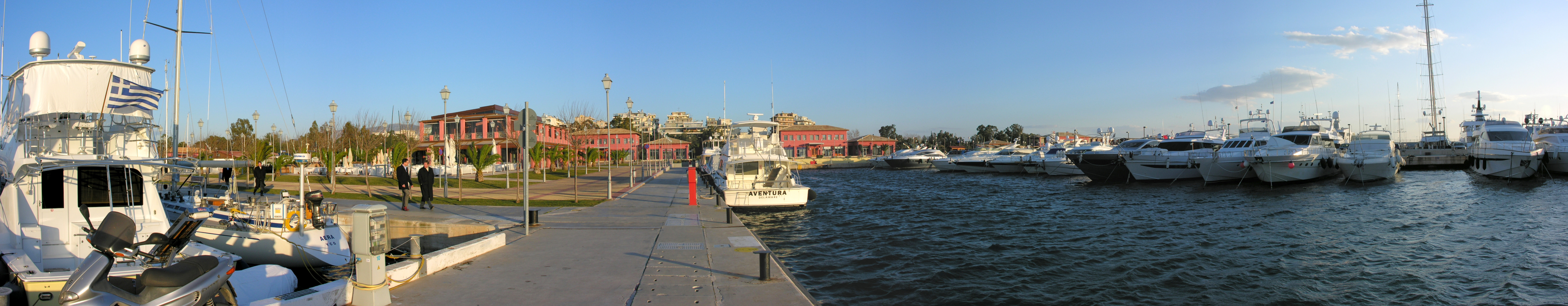
View of the Marina of Flisvos and its yachts

== Churches of Palaio Faliro ==
The oldest church of Palaio Faliro is the chapel of St. George in Xirotagaro, next to the Museum of Naval Tradition. It was built probably in the 17th century, when the area was known by the Turks as Three Towers. Restored 1985.

The large church of St. Alexander is the metropolis of Palaio Faliro and is located in St. Alexander Street, the main commercial thoroughfare, at the corner with Alcyonis Street. In order to satisfy the spiritual needs of the growing population of Palaio Faliro the church was founded at the behest of the "Urban League of Palaio Faliro" on 5 June 1916, in honour St. Alexander, Archbishop of Constantinople. The foundation stone was laid by the then prince, later king, Alexander of the Hellenes. The church was completely rebuilt on the same site in 1952.

The Church of the Assumption of Mary is in Achilles Street. It is a large and imposing building on the model of Hagia Sophia in Constantinople. The first church was built in 1930 and burned down in 1969.

The church of St. Barbara, in St. Barbara Avenue, gave its name to the district of the same name in Paleo Faliro. Initially built in 1936 as a wooden chapel, the current Byzantine style church was completed in 1965.

The church of Ayia Kyriaki, in Amfitheas Street, was founded in 1955 as a private wooden church. It became a parish church in 1957. The present stone building was built in 1964 and the site includes a separate stone tower at the corner with Palaeologos Street.

== Sports ==
The Scouts of Greece have a Sea Scout Group in Palaio Faliro. Palaio Faliro also has an A1 water polo team named AC Palaio Faliro. Palaio Faliro is also home to its professional basketball club Paleo Faliro B.C., which is currently in the Greek Second Division.

== Notable people and residents ==
- Mad Clip
- Pavlos Kountouriotis
- Christodoulos of Athens
- Dimitrios Levidis
- Kostas Rigopoulos
- Yanis Varoufakis
- Nikolaos Vokos
- Vera Zavitsianou
- Demetrius of Phalerum
