= Dionysis Hatzidakis =

Greek mayor

Dionysis Hatzidakis is the mayor of Palaio Faliro, one of the municipalities in the greater Athens area, Greece.

He was born in Chania in Crete. After graduating from the Hellenic Naval Academy in 1965, he spent 27 years in the Greek Navy, commanding three warships. From 1991 to 1994 he served as Naval Attaché of Greece in Paris where he participated in the renegotiation of the Mirage 2000 acquisition, the arrangements for the UNFICYP and the negotiations for the establishment of Exocet missiles in Cyprus.

For nine years from 1994 he was the general director of the political office of the former prime minister Konstantinos Mitsotakis. In 1998 he stood as a candidate for Mayor of Palaio Faliro, but was defeated by Dimitris Kapsanis, coming second in the second round with 47.7% of the vote.

In the municipal elections of 2002 he knocked out incumbent mayor Kapsanis in the first round and was elected in the second round with 53.6%, at the head of the alliance named “New Force for Faliro".

He was re-elected in 2006, 2010 and 2014. In 2014 he was elected in the first round with 65.8% of the vote.

He was elected to the Hellenic Parliament in the June 2023 Greek legislative election from Athens B3 from New Democracy.
