= Wallu Valpio =

Finnish media personality

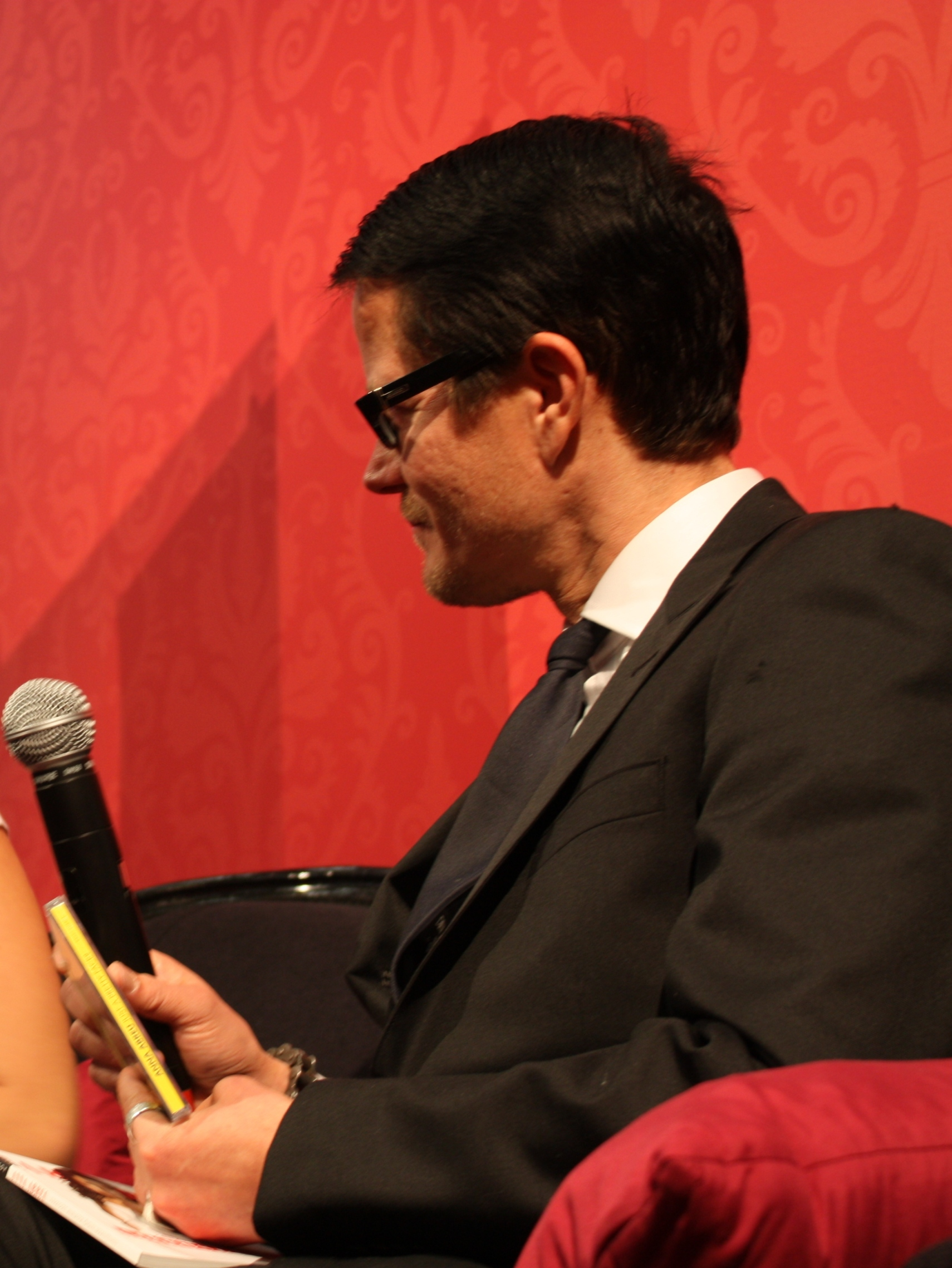
Wallu Valpio

Jani Petteri "Wallu" Valpio (born 7 September 1973 in Jyväskylä) is a Finnish media personality.

Valpio began his career as a member of the musical group Arto Muna ja Millennium Orkesteri. He then hosted the Never Trust a Hippie programme on the free cable-channel MoonTV and later other music-themed programmes, such as annual Festival Specials and Videoraati (the channel's take on Levyraati). After the cancellation of MoonTV, he appeared on the YLE show Elämä pelissä (Life on the Line).
