= Fides (name) =

Fides is a feminine given name of Latin origin, meaning "Faith" (in honor of the Christian virtue; originally Greek Πίστις). It has different forms in various European national languages: French "Foy", Spanish "Fe", Russian "Vera" (Вера).

People with the name include:

== Saints ==
- Fides (deity), goddess of trust in Roman mythology
- Saint Fides (Saint Faith), christian martyrs:
  - Saints Faith, Hope and Charity and their mother Sophie (Wisdom) (d. 137)
  - Saint Faith of Agen (d. 287 or 290)

== Other ==
- Fides Benini (1929–?), Italian former swimmer
- Fides Cuyugan-Asensio (born 1931), Filipino operatic soprano
- Fides Romanin (1934–2019), Italian cross-country skier
