= Marika Makaroff =

Finnish content creator, producer and creative director

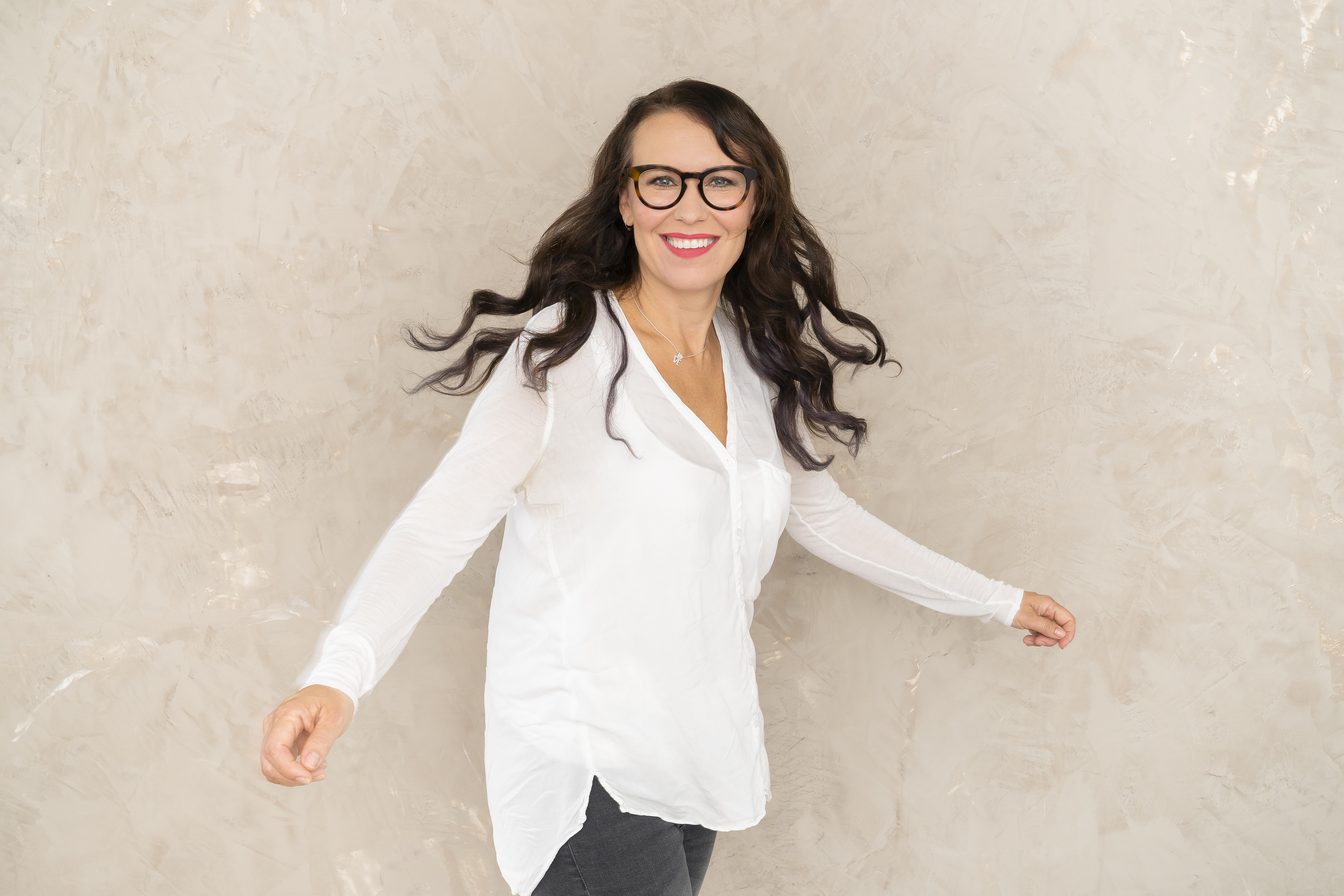
- Marika Makaroff
- Title: founder and CCO of Gutsy Animations
- Website: https://www.gutsy.fi

Katja Marika Makaroff is a content creator, producer and creative director. She is the founder and CCO of Gutsy Animations. She was the creative director in Fremantle Media and Filmlance International and the CEO in Fremantle Media Finland and Friday TV.

Makaroff produced Finnish versions of TV shows such as The Apprentice, Dragons Den, Idols, Top Model and X Factor. She has also produced drama and sold content to over 70 countries. Marika won the One Show's Silver pencil award for branded content in 2015 for her format Buy this.

Makaroff is the executive producer and creative director of the TV-series Moominvalley (2019). The series' first episode was the most watched program on Finnish national broadcaster Yle's streaming service, Yle Areena.

== Career ==
Makaroff became known for her work as a journalist in both television and radio. She worked in series such as Jyrki, Wild bunch and Under construction Finland. In 2003 she hosted a political talk show series, Makaroff & Modig, together with journalist Silvia Modig. In 2005 Marika became the CEO of Fremantle Media Finland. In 2011 she became the Creative director of the company, overseeing all creative development in the Nordics. In 2014 she moved to Stockholm to become the CEO of Friday TV. In 2015 she became the creative director of Filmlance international, that is known for creating original format of the TV-series The Bridge.

In 2016 Makaroff founded the production company Gutsy Animations.

Makaroff is the creative director and executive producer in an animated TV-series Moominvalley. The series is based on the beloved Moomin books and comics by the Finnish author and illustrator Tove Jansson and her brother Lars Jansson. The first two seasons are directed by the Oscar® winner Steve Box (2006 Best Animation feature Wallace and Gromit: Curse of the were-rabbit). The third season is directed by Nigel Davies, Sara Barbas, Darren Robbie and Jay Grace and additionally, the fourth by Nigel Davies.

Moominvalley premiered globally in spring 2019. The first episode of Moominvalley jumped up to a league of a million when it premiered in Finland's Yle TV2 in February 2019. The same episode also became the most watched television series episode of all time in Yle's streaming service, Yle Areena, bringing the total viewership of the first episode in Finland to over two million. Gutsy Animations is currently producing the series' fourth season.

In 2019 Moominvalley was awarded the Best Animated Kid's Programme at TBI's Content Innovation Awards. The series was nominated for an International Emmy Kids Awards in 2020. Moominvalley won a Golden Venla award for Best Children's Program in 2019 and again in 2020. Moominvalley was nominated for the Annie Awards in 2023 in the category of Children as well as Annecy in 2021 in the category of TV Films in Competition. In 2023 Moominvalley won the award for Best Animation at Shanghai TV Festival Magnolia Awards and the Best Animated Image at Golden Panda. Moominvalley was nominated for the Best Kids Animation at the International Emmy Kids Awards again in 2023.
