= Anna Näkkäläjärvi-Länsman =

Finnish Sámi musician and singer

Annamaret at Womex 2023

Anna Näkkäläjärvi-Länsman (born 1979) is a Sámi singer-songwriter and founder member of the Sámi music academy. Also known by her stage name Ánnámáret,. she is a Sámi yoiker known for her work with ensembles, and for combining electronic music, Karelian bowed lyre jouhikko sounds and video art, and for marrying the traditional and the avant garde in Sámi music.

== Early life and career ==
Näkkäläjärvi was born in 1979 in the village of Inari on the Finnish side of Sápmi. The village is considered by some to be the cultural capital of the Sámi people. She attended Sámi language classes with one other student an hour before most students started the normal day's classes which were held in Finnish. At school, in the fifth grade, she participated in the first Sámi youth event performing yoik with fellow students. Keen on music, but without the possibility of Sámi music lessons, she first learned the flute and then the clarinet. She attended high school in Rovaniemi. She played in a military band. She continued with the clarinet at the Tampere music institute and at the Sibelius Academy, in the Degree Programme of Music Performance, she majored in clarinet. She is now working, remotely, towards a doctorate at the University of the Arts, Helsinki Utsjoki, Finland. Her research topic is Sámi yoik. Näkkäläjärvi-Länsman combines classical music and the yoik tradition of her own family which she researched by listening to old archive recordings.

Sometimes known by her professional name of Ánnámáret, she collaborates with musicians in various ensembles. She has released several albums with the Ánnámáret Ensemble and with Ánnámáret Luohteilbmi, combining electronic music, Karelian bowed lyre jouhikko and video art.

She was a provincial artist of Sámi Culture from 2012 to 2015. In addition to performing at festivals, she is the voice of Vilijonkka in the animated series Moominvalley. Näkkäläjärvi-Länsman has worked as a tutor in the Sibelius Academy's Global Music training programme. She is involved in the EU-funded Sámi Music Academy in Utsjoki which was set up in 2015. Since 2019, the Academy has run a one-year course of professional education for Sámi music using yoik archives.

== Discography ==
Ánnámáret Ensemble:

- The Beallječiŋat (2011)
- Gollehelmmot (2016)
- Hosanna. Single. (2024)

Annamaries:

- Nieguid Duovdagat (2021)
- Bálvvosbáiki (2024)

The Angels of the Sun:

- The Guns (2025)
- Psalm Duomis. Single. (2025)

== Awards ==
In 2023, Ánnámáret and her group were selected as official WOMEX showcase artists. In 2024, Bálvvosbáiki was Folk music Album of the year in Finland.

== Private life ==
Näkkäläjärvi married reindeer herder and Sámi politician Asko Länsman in 2011. They live near Nuorgam in the municipality of Utsjoki, with their two children.
