= Kill Arman =

Finnish television series

- Genre: Travel / documentary
- Created by: Tuukka Tiensuu; Arman Alizad
- Starring: Arman Alizad
- Country of origin: Finland
- Original languages: Finnish; English
- No. of seasons: 2
- No. of episodes: 20

Production
- Running time: 24 minutes

Original release
- Network: Jim; BBC Knowledge; Extreme Sports Channel
- Release: 2009 – 2010

Kill Arman is a reality/documentary TV series about martial arts, created by Tuukka Tiensuu and Arman Alizad, and hosted by Alizad. The series was first broadcast in Finland in 2009. Currently, two seasons have been filmed and the series is airing in over 100 countries worldwide.

== Synopsis ==
Arman Alizad is a tailor and a fashion reporter, who has not engaged in physical activity in over 20 years. But in Kill Arman, he has to travel to exotic locations around the world, train a different martial art in every episode, and finally fight a master of that martial art. The physical and mental challenges make Alizad question his own belief systems, and he finds whole new sides to himself.

== Cast and characters ==
Along with the host, Arman Alizad, the episodes have many famous martial arts masters mentoring Alizad. These masters include for example Leung Ting, Leo Gaje, Martin Kampmann, Ray Sefo and Amin Asikainen.

== Production ==
Kill Arman is a co-production between Rabbit Films, Armanin Maailma and Jim. The series was created by Arman Alizad and Tuukka Tiensuu. Tiensuu is also the director of the series.

== Awards and nominations ==
In 2010, Kill Arman was nominated for the Best Finnish TV show of the year in Venla-gaala.

== Distribution ==
Kill Arman is distributed in Finland by Jim. Internationally it is distributed by DRG. It airs in several dozen TV networks around the world, including the BBC.
