= Alamaailman Vasarat =

Finnish musical group

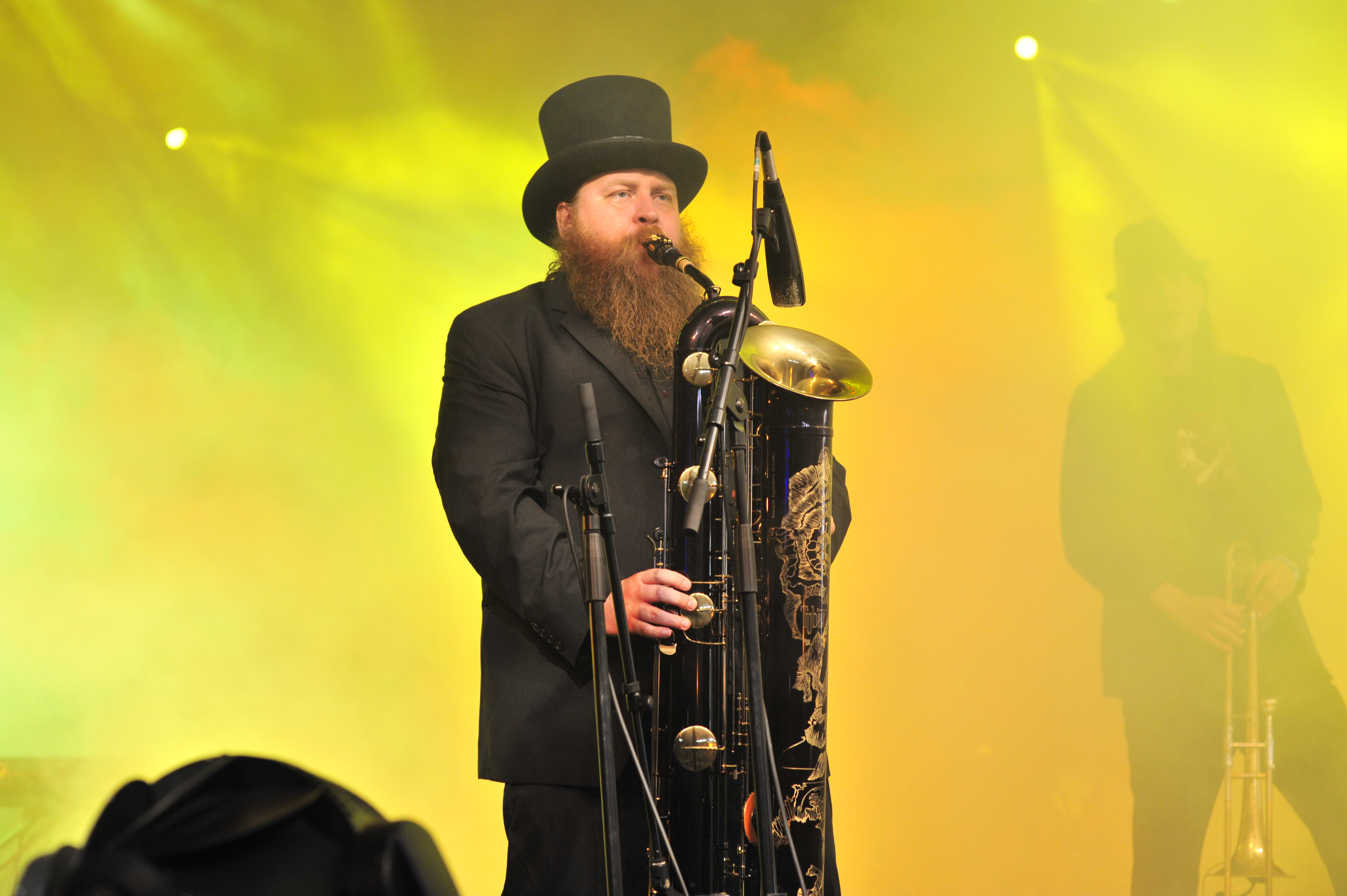
- Jarno Sarkula of Alamaailman Vasarat at Roskilde Festival 2009

Background information
- Origin: Finland
- Genres: World music, avant-garde, progressive metal, klezmer
- Years active: 1997–present
- Labels: Laskeuma Records, Nordic Notes, Wolfgang Records, Johanna Kustannus Oy
- Members: Jarno Sarkula; Jarkko Niemelä; Miikka Huttunen; Tuukka Helminen; Marko Manninen; Santeri Saksala
- Past members: Teemu Hänninen; Erno Haukkala

Alamaailman Vasarat (translated: "The Hammers of the Underworld") is an avant-garde Finnish musical group formed in 1997. Their music is influenced by European folk, klezmer, jazz and metal. Though not officially disbanded the group has been inactive since 2014. The band's founder Jarno Sarkula died on 12 July 2020 in Portugal.

== Band members ==
The names of the band members are taken from various sources.

- Jarno Sarkula (sopranino, soprano, alto, tenor, bass and contrabass saxophones, clarinet, contrabass clarinet, various woodwind instruments)
- Teemu Hänninen (drums, percussion)
- Erno Haukkala (brass instruments)
- Miikka Huttunen (pump organ, grand piano, keyboards, melodica)
- Tuukka Helminen (cello)
- Marko Manninen (cello, theremin)
- Jarkko Niemelä (trumpet, alto horn)
- Santeri Saksala (drums, percussion)

Teemu, Jarno and Marko were also both part of the band Höyry-Kone, which released two albums in 1995 and 1997. Erno also played with the band from 1997 to 2001 although he is not featured on either of the albums.

== Discography ==
The info for the following discography is taken from various sources.

- Vasaraasia (2000)
- Käärmelautakunta (2003)
- Kinaporin Kalifaatti (with Tuomari Nurmio) (2005)
- Palataan Aasiaan (2005, DVD)
- Maahan (2007)
- Huuro Kolkko (2009)
- Haudasta lomilla, DVD (2010)
- Valta (2012)
