= Vera Hacken =

American writer (1912 – 1988)

- Born: Vera Yakovlevna Altman; May 18, 1912; Odessa, Russian Empire
- Died: November 2, 1988 (aged 76); Cliffside Park, New Jersey, US
- Other names: Vera Haken, Вера Хакен, װעראַ האַקען
- Occupations: Writer, translator, poet, playwright, director

Vera Hacken (Russian: Вера Хакен, Yiddish: װעראַ האַקען; May 18, 1912 – November 2, 1988) was an American writer, translator, playwright, and theatrical director, born in Odessa.

== Early life ==
Vera Yakovlevna Altman was born in Odessa, Russian Empire, the daughter of Yakov Altman and Mani Altman. Her family was Jewish; her father was a doctor. She was raised in Chernivtsi. She studied with director Max Reinhardt in Vienna, and with writer Eliezer Steinbarg.

== Career ==
Altman taught school, worked as an editor, directed plays, and wrote in Yiddish and German while living in Chernivtsi, Alma-Ata, Tashkent, Bucharest, and Munich. She moved to the United States in 1951. In New York, she was a director for the Folksbine Jewish Theater. Her plays were also produced in Latin America. Her stories appeared in Tsukunft and Afn Shvel. Her poetry was collected in Dine Roitkop (1978), and her memoirs were published in Der Meteor (1980). She also translated Yiddish stories into German in Die Bücher der goldenen Pawe (6 volumes, 1980s). She also wrote for television with Peter Goode. "My great desire is to be discovered by my new home land, America," she told an interviewer in 1957. "I think I can work many years as a playwright and a stage director." She was a mentor to young Jewish writers.

== Publications ==
- Ḳinder-yorn: yugnṭ yorn miṭ Eliezer Shṭaynbarg (1969), also known as Kinder- und Jugendjahre mit Elieser Steinbarg
- Die Bücher der goldenen Pawe (6 volumes, 1980s)
- Sṭantsye Grafsḳaya: dertseylungen, eseyen, lider (1990, posthumous collection)

== Personal life ==
Altman married psychiatrist and composer Emanuel Hacken. They had a son, George. In the United States, the Hackens lived on the grounds of the Rockland State Hospital while her husband was the hospital's deputy director. Hacken and her husband became United States citizens by naturalization in 1956. She died in Cliffside Park, New Jersey in 1988, aged 76 years. Several books of her poetry and other writings were published posthumously.
