= Vera Olsson =

Finnish TV producer and host

- Born: 4 April 1974 (age 51); Helsinki, Finland
- Occupation: TV-producer
- Years active: 1999–present

Vera Olsson is a Finnish TV producer and TV host. She has worked as a producer for MoonTV, FremantleMedia and The Voice TV Finland. Her works include "Venäjän halki 30 päivässä" for YLE network, "Loman Tarpeessa" and "Arman Reilaa" for Nelonen, and "Dresscode (TV series)" for MoonTV.
