= Vera Zavitsianou =

Greek actress

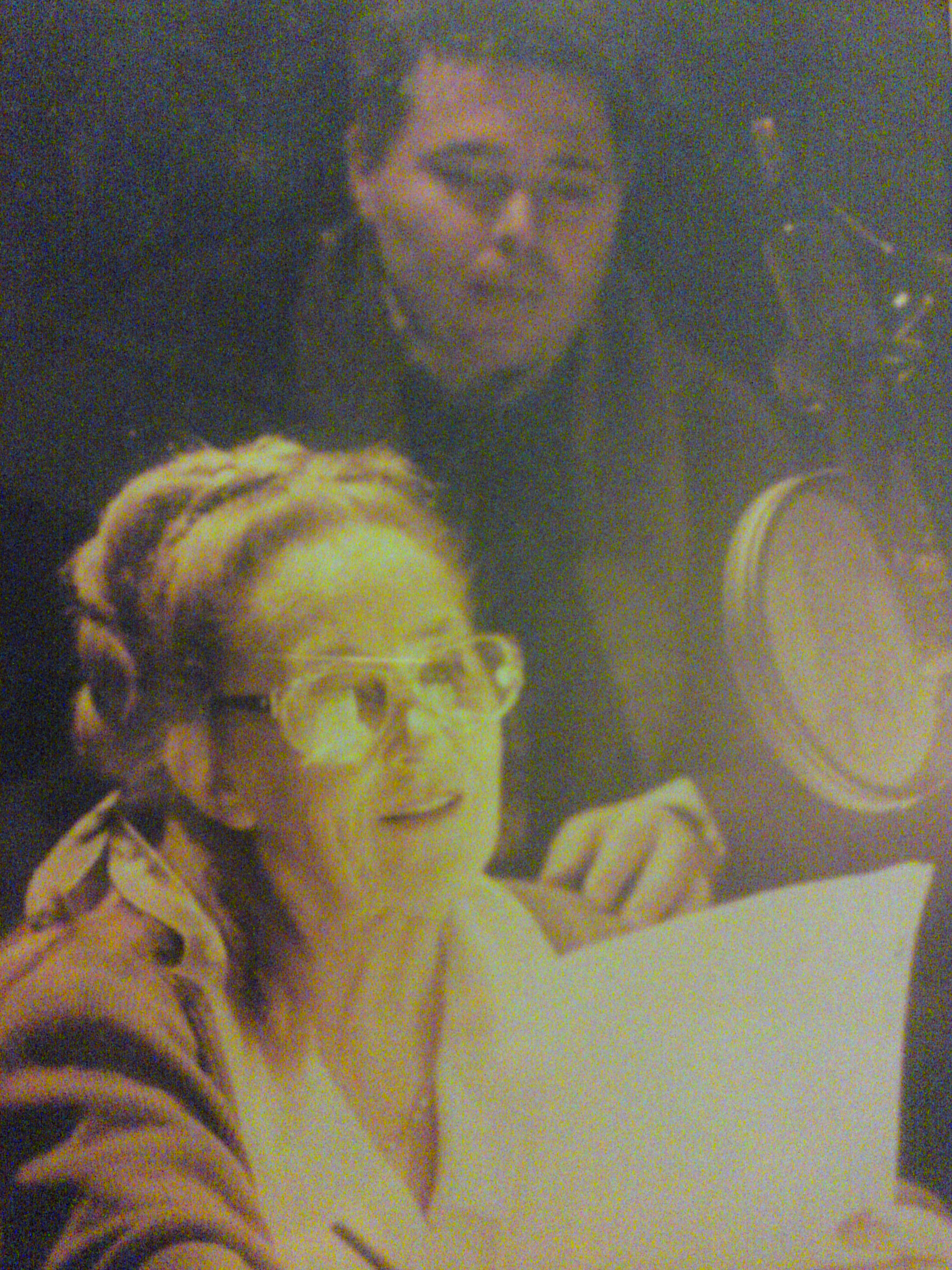

Vera Zavitsianou (Greek: Βέρα Ζαβιτσιάνου; 1927–2008) was a famous actress of Greek theatre. She was born in 1927 in Palaio Faliro. She started as a singer. She sang with her sister, Mary Lo in Greek boites. She studied at the Dramatic School of Theatre of Art in Athens and in 1954 she appeared in her first role in the play of Thornton Wilder With Teeth.

- In 1958 she started playing in the Theater of Art a series of roles in major plays, many of them played for the first time in Greece: Camera, Blood Wedding and Perlimplin and Belissa by Federico García Lorca The Bear, Day and The Cherry Orchard by Anton Chekhov, Hello from Bertha, The Rose Tattoo and Summer and Smoke by Tennessee Williams, The Wild Duck by Henrik Ibsen, Twelfth Night by William Shakespeare, Bus Stop, Living room, Court of Miracles of Iakovos Kambanellis, The Good Person of Szechwan of Bertolt Brecht.
- She was an impresario with Alekos Alexandrakis and Angelos Antonopoulos, and starred for many years in the Greek Popular Theatre of Manos Katrakis.
- On the TV was presented only once the title role of "Madame Koula" series based on the novel by M. Menis Koumandareas.
- She died on September 11, 2008.
