= Vera Shitjeni =

Albanian judge

Member of Albanian Election Commission
- In office 2 February 2009 – 2013
- Nominated by: Democratic Party
- Appointed by: Assembly of the Republic of Albania

Personal details
- Born: 21 March 1974 (age 52) Shkodër, Albania

Vera Shitjeni (born 21 March 1974) is member of the Central Election Commission of Albania for the Democratic Party of Albania.
