= Fillyjonk =

Fillyjonks
- Moomins character
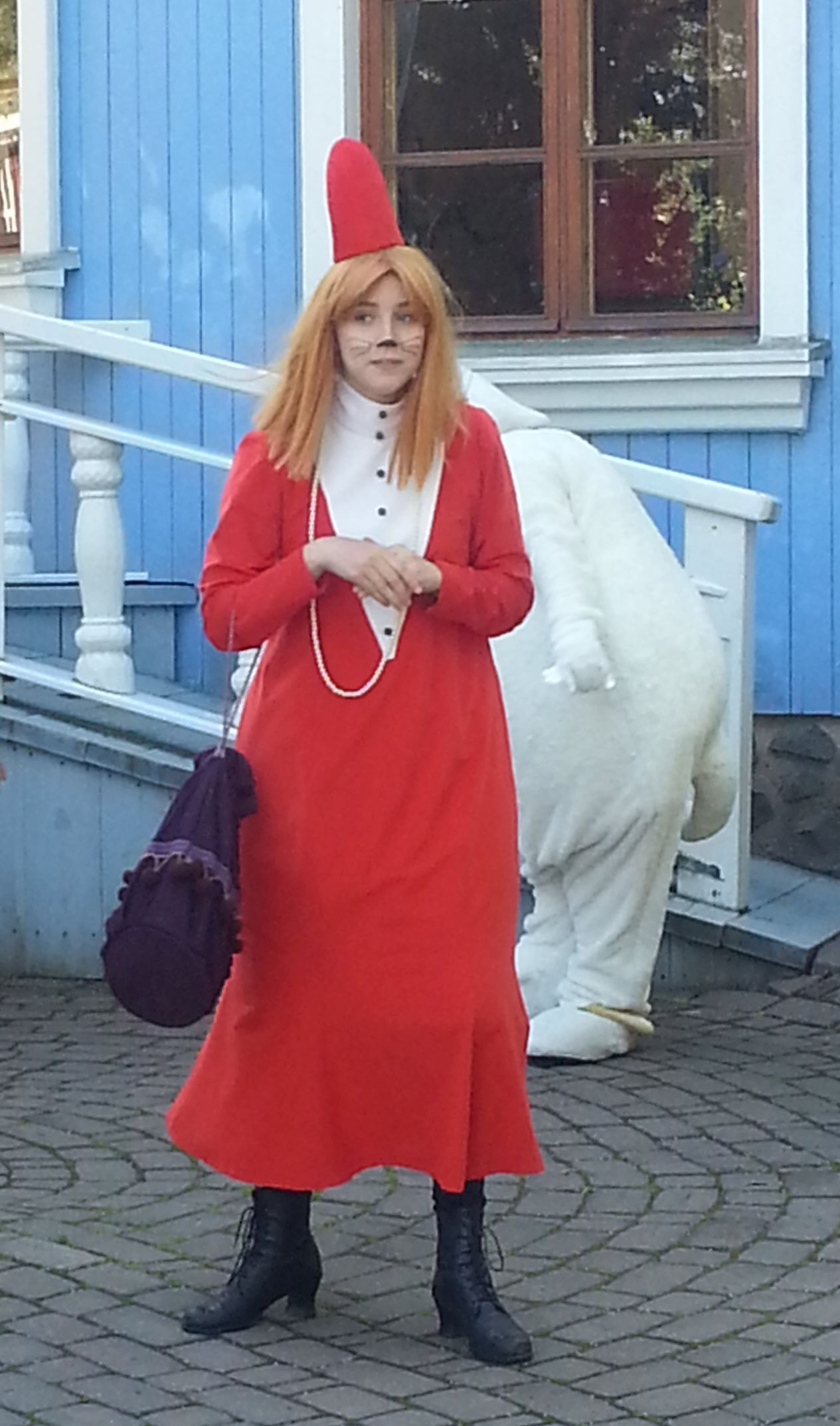
- Fillyjonk, Moominworld
- First appearance: "The Book about Moomin, Mymble and Little My"; 1951
- Last appearance: "Mrs. Fillyjonk's Last Hurrah"; 2022
- Created by: Tove Jansson

In-universe information
- Species: Humanoid rodent
- Nationality: Swedish

Fillyjonks (Swedish: Filifjonkan) are fictional characters from the Moomins book series by Swedish-speaking Finnish writer Tove Jansson. They are one of the species living in the Moomin Valley.

== Etymology ==
The word has no semantic meaning, but with the first element compare filibuffare "joker", filidera, "make bad noise", and with the second, fjompa/fjanta/fjolla + -an = "silly/foolish/fussy woman").

== Plot ==
The first Fillyjonks mentioned are the late theatre director in Moominsummer Madness (the Rat is his widow) and the young Fillyjonk who joins the Snork Maiden in the late night jaunt to the wishing well. Later there is a psychological study of the "Fillyjonk Who Believed In Disasters" in Tales from Moominvalley. She has not a single moment of fantasy or joy, only duties and discipline; she is an extremely methodical person tied down with principles and has a deep rooted belief in prestige and tradition. Nevertheless, after a catastrophe, the Fillyjonk can be freed from the trammels of social expectation and can discover the joys of freedom, irrationality and self-expression. Deep inside she has a wish to live freely as the Moomin family does, without any worries.

Fillyjonks resemble humanoid rodents; they are tall and thin, with long muzzles and raccoon-like rings around their eyes.

== Analysis ==
Analyzing the stereotypes in the Moomins series, Hanna Dymel-Trzebiatowska wrote that the Fillyjonks are an example of a stereotypical woman who is obsessed with "cleaning and raising well-behaved children. She is also neurotic and feels oppressed by her own mental constraints".

Dan Zahavi described Fillyjonks as a "striking" type of character whose "joyless life" revolves around "maintaining empty rituals and formal customs."
