= Vera Nikolaevna Maslennikova =

Russian mathematician (1926–2000)

- Born: 29 April 1926; Priluki, Russia
- Died: 14 August 2000 (aged 74)
- Known for: Hydrodynamics; Functional analysis
- Awards: State Prize of the USSR; Bertrand Bolzano Gold Medal
- Scientific career
- Fields: Partial differential equations
- Workplaces: Russian Peoples’ Friendship University; Mathematical Institute of the Academy of Sciences; Steklov Mathematical Institute
- Doctoral advisor: Sergei Sobolev

Vera Nikolaevna Maslennikova (Russian: Вера Николаевна Масленникова; 29 April 1926 – 14 August 2000) was a Russian mathematician known for her contributions to the theory of partial differential equations.

== Early life and war service ==
Maslennikova was born on 29 April 1926 in the village of Priluki near Vologda in the former USSR. Little is known about her childhood except that she lost her parents when she was only eleven years old. In 1941 she entered the Moscow Textile Engineering School. Maslennikova served in the Great Patriotic War for Russia during the early 1940s in the 413th Independent Antiaircraft Artillery Division in the front-line army. For her service she was awarded the Order of the Patriotic War.

== Mathematical career ==
After the war she enrolled in the Faculty of Mechanics and Mathematics at the University of Moscow. She graduated with distinction in 1951, having studied under Alexander Gelfond. Maslennikova then enrolled as a graduate student at the Steklov Institute of Mathematics, advised by Sergei Sobolev. She obtained her doctorate in 1954 on the topic of "fundamental solutions of initial boundary-value problems for systems of hydrodynamics of rotating fluids with regard to compressibility." She then continued research at the Steklov Institute, working there for twenty two years. In 1975 she became the chair of differential equations and functional analysis at the Patrice Lumumba University and continued working there until her death in 2000.

== Research ==
She worked in the field of partial differential equations, the mathematical hydrodynamics of rotating fluids, and in function spaces, having published more than one hundred and forty research papers.
