= MoonTV =

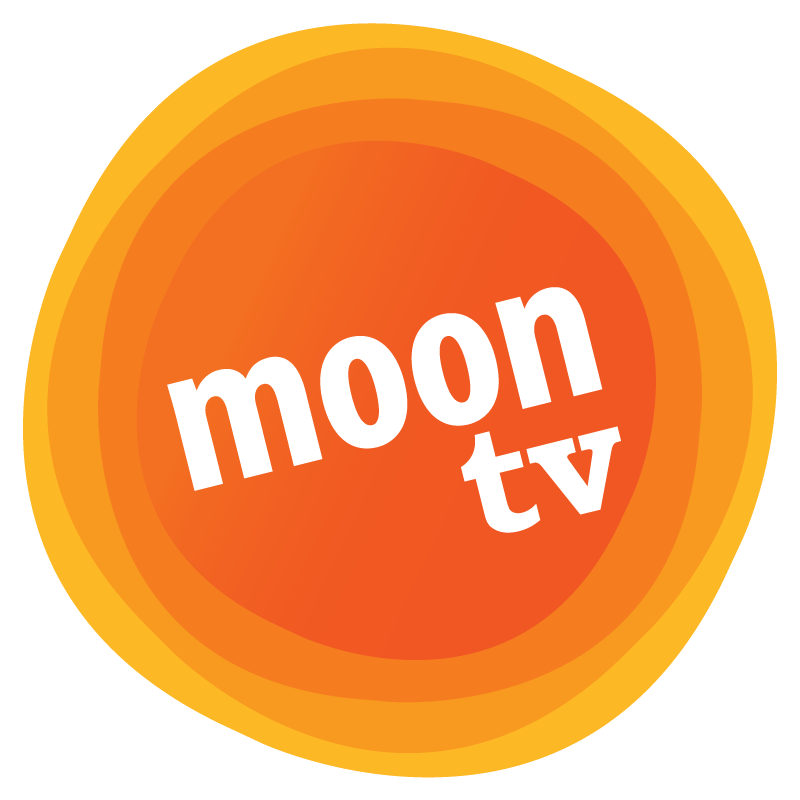
- Country: Finland
- Broadcast area: In Finland's largest cities, currently online

Programming
- Language: Finnish

History
- Launched: 1997 (cable); 23 March 2010 (Internet)
- Closed: 1 July 2003 (cable)

Links
- Website: moontv.fi

MoonTV was a free Finnish cable network channel. It started off as a channel for programmes about computer and video games but later grew into a channel covering several areas of youth culture. In its prime it was the first interactive TV channel in the world. At its best MoonTV could reach 1.3 million potential viewers in the 12 biggest cities across Finland. In 2003 the channel was shut down after the company that owned it filed for bankruptcy.

MoonTV was relaunched in 2010 online with new hosts and a new program line-up.

== People ==
Mika Koivula and Hannu and Pekka Kossila were the founding members of MoonTV. Koivula came up with the name "MoonTV" back in 1996. Pekka Kossila was in charge of creating economical interactive TV formats which were the core of the channel when it started its test broadcasts in November 1996. Hannu Kossila, CEO, took care of the marketing and expansion of the channel.

MoonTV is noted for bringing forth youth-icon and political representative Wallu Valpio former member of the music group "Arto Muna ja Millennium Orkesteri".

== Programming and production style ==
The programs were shot primarily around the city of Helsinki, with occasional programming such as concert events and E3 shot elsewhere. If shows were not hosted at MoonTV's studios they were usually shot at public locales. MoonTV employees were notorious for relying heavily on guerilla shoots (shooting without permits). This was poked fun at in the early airings in commercials which showed candid footage of a police-car chasing the film crew. For these reasons certain inserts were usually hosted at playgrounds or inside clubs or restaurants. As MoonTV became better recognised such problems with shooting became less of an issue.

MoonTV gathered the support of several Finnish musical artists who would regularly shoot inserts and commercials for the show. Most noticeably Jimi Pääkallo's "Se on ihmisten tekemä" (It's made by humans) insert became extremely popular amongst viewers. Pääkallo was also a regular guest and even shot a commercial for the channel's cooking show Musta Pippuri.

MoonTV's initial purpose was to be, according to channel's co-founder Pekka Kossila, a 24/7 video game-oriented channel. Originally channel's programs were very short, sometimes only 15 minutes, but with the introduction of more youth-oriented programs the average show-length became 30 minutes (with commercials). MoonTV's programming was updated weekly (originally on Mondays, later on Thursdays) and this meant that reruns of any show could be seen several times daily like in today's movie or music channels. However, there were several programmes like the entertainment and sport news that were updated on a daily basis via the Web. Aivoradio (Brain Radio), a 15-minute news and current events programme was the only show to be updated daily, but appeared only for a brief time very late into MoonTV's existence.

Being a completely computer-run channel MoonTV was prone to various technical malfunctions. During its run the channel "went dark" several times. The periods of darkness could last anywhere from a few minutes to a whole week. Additionally, the fact that the channel was not supported by a bigger, better established channel (such as SubTV which is a part of MTV3) undoubtedly had effects in the overall production values of the channel's programmes. Unlike other commercial channels, MoonTV did not feature subtitling for programmes, regardless of their language.

Despite having minimal impact in Finnish television culture MoonTV sustained a steady fan-base and helped launch the careers of several of their employees and associates such as Jarno Sarkula of the band Alamaailman Vasarat, Miika Huttunen and Thomas Puha, the main editors of the game magazine Pelaaja and the Finnish equivalent of Jackass, the Extreme Duudsonit.

== Internet relaunch ==
In 2010, MoonTV was revived with its programmes now hosted online. Some of the technical and production crew is the same as the original MoonTV's, however, its shows and hosts are entirely new.

== Original Hosts ==
=== Game related shows ===
- Kimmo Nikkanen was the first regular host (along with the co-founder of MoonTV, Pekka Kossila) of Moon TV. He has written many books about games. Because he was living four hours away from Helsinki (in Jyväskylä), he would come and work a continuous 20-hour shift to get games tested, texts written and hosted for the programmes just to get back to his family. These programmes were then later divided among new Moon TV hosts.
- Pekka Kossila was the co-founder of MoonTV. He was the original host of PSX-Peliluola, PPPS-Peliluola and TOP TEN Peliluola game shows.
- Jarno Sarkula (alias Kreivi Stakula), one of the best loved hosts who occasionally traveled outside the borders of his own show. Best remembered for his gothically themed introductions and wordplay. He hosted the PC game shows PC-Peliluola (one of the longest-running shows on MoonTV) and PC-Planet (broken in to its own show from Game Planet and later fused with the first one) and also Damage which rated DVD releases and was also one of the last 15-minute shows on the channel.
- Thomas "Everlast" Puha hosted several console-related shows included PSX-Peliluola, N64-Peliluola and Play which later changed its name to Player after Puha left the show in his own words "To seek out Natalie Portman". Thomas also hosted URL with Miika Huttunen. Puha is one of the best recognised figures from MoonTV, known for his laid-back gamer image.
- Miika "druidi" Huttunen hosted Peliuutiset (Game News) before it was fused with the main game-related programs PC-Peliluola and Play. He also hosted URL in which he and Thomas Puha visited websites submitted by audiences. URL was infamously one of the last 15-minute shows aired on MoonTV. Huttunen is recognised for his very calm (criticized as apathetic) narrative style.
- Elias "Olmoor" Poutanen took over the hosting duties of Play (renamed Player) after Puha left the show. Best remembered for his youthful energy.

Miika Huttunen, Thomas Puha and Elias Poutanen were later reunited on the show Play (intentionally or unintentionally named after a program on MoonTV) which aired on Nelonen from 2004 to 2005. Jarno Sarkula also made two guest appearances on the show.

=== Others ===
- Wallu Valpio, a member former of the musical group Arto Muna ja Millennium Orkester who rose to fame on MoonTV's various musically themed shows.
- Sacha, hosted the show REC which showed skateboarding and snowboarding videos made by fans and rated by the studio guests. Also hosted a cooking-show Musta Pippuri. He was responsible for bringing in many of the hosts to MoonTV such as Arman Alizad and Aleksi Litovaara. He currently runs and is a part-owner of Helsinki's popular We Got Beef bar and the Bali-hai restaurant.
- Johanna Kiiski, host of the metal music show 666 Sekuntia (renamed later to 667 Sekuntia).
- Tumppi hosted Word!, a show for rap and hip-hop interviews and music videos.
- Arman Alizad, one of the most controversial hosts in MoonTV's history, both loved and hated by the viewers, Arman was introduced with the lifestyle-oriented show Dresscode. In one of the most bizarre moves in the channel's history he also ended up hosting the online multiplayer themed game-show Over Dose (endorsed by the Finnish Dose chain of gaming stores).

== Original shows ==
- PC-Peliluola, as mentioned above, hosted by Kreivi Stakula was the longest-running program as it was part of the original programming schedule when MoonTV first went on air. Kimmo Nikkanen hosted the early airings of the show.
- Bubblegum, later renamed Purkka (meaning chewing gum) was the first music-oriented program on the channel and mainly concentrated on pop music. After a change in name and image the show was eventually cancelled (most likely due to a lack of interest).
- Movie File was another show that was cancelled before 2003. The programme included film reviews, news and Top-10s. It aired for a while alongside Movie File + which was supposed to have more in-depth footage about the makings of specific movies, but was cancelled after only a handful of episodes were made.
- Never Trust a Hippie, originally starting as a rock-oriented show; it quickly moved to cover many genres of music becoming a more general magazine-type program. The longest-running music program on MoonTV, originally hosted by Wallu Valpio.
- Festival Specials, annual long-form reports of various music festivals in Finland and elsewhere were also well regarded by the fans of MoonTV.
- E3 Specials, also became a tradition for the channel.
- Boxi was a 15-minute programme with info on the weekly programming and where hosts of various shows would answer feedback from viewers.
- URL was a program about two geeks checking out websites submitted by watchers. The programme managed to attain a small but active following with its often humorous attitude combined with quotations from Star Wars. The same programme was often aired many times a night because of its short length (some have counted over 10!). The show was hosted by Thomas Puha and Druidi Huttunen
- Dresscode (TV series), was a fashion show hosted by Arman Alizad.
