= Pelaaja =

Finnish video games magazine and website

Cover of issue 100 of Pelaaja-magazine

Pelaaja ("Gamer", "Player") was a Finnish video games magazine published 11 times a year by H-Town. Pelaaja turned 15 years old in 2017. Pelaaja covered both PCs and consoles, although between 2003 and 2007 the publication focused only on consoles. During that time the PC coverage was in a separate magazine named PCPelaaja, now defunct – its editor-in-chief being Miika Huttunen, a former executive editor of Pelaaja (in 2002 and again between 2011 and 2019).

== History and profile ==
Pelaaja was started by 2002. The longest running editor-in-chief of Pelaaja was Thomas Puha. Its current editor-in-chief is Miika Huttunen, a veteran of the Finnish electronic gaming scene and among the permanent staff is Janne Pyykkönen, who is also the editor-in-chief of H-Town's Pelaa! magazine. The art director is Lasse Erkola and some of the frequent collaborators include Miikka Lehtonen, Tero Lehtiniemi and Jukka O. Kauppinen.

The magazine is more akin to European and American videogames magazines than Finnish ones with its focus on exclusive coverage on the latest games and extensive interviews with members of the development community. Game reviews are also a big part of the magazine. The magazine's tagline is "for the love of gaming" as the magazine's staff are hardcore gaming enthusiasts, which is evident in the passionate writing of the magazine features. The magazine was started because the people working on the magazine felt there was no high quality games magazine available in Finland which would focus on console games rather than the PC. Another feature is the international vibe of the magazine via Japan- and US- based writers contributing to the magazine.

Pelaaja focuses heavily on its art direction, which is handled by Lasse Erkola, with additional design during the years from Thomas Puha. The magazine was redesigned in summer of 2005 and re-launched in October 2005. Another redesign coincided with the magazine's 10th anniversary issue #121 in October 2012. PC games also made a return to the magazine during this redesign.

Puha and Huttunen are known to cable television and public broadcasting channel viewing audiences for both their games related program appearances and their program featuring neat webpages.

The print magazine was shut down in 2025. The website is still active.

== See also ==
- List of magazines in Finland
