= Arman Alizad =

Iranian-Finnish tailor

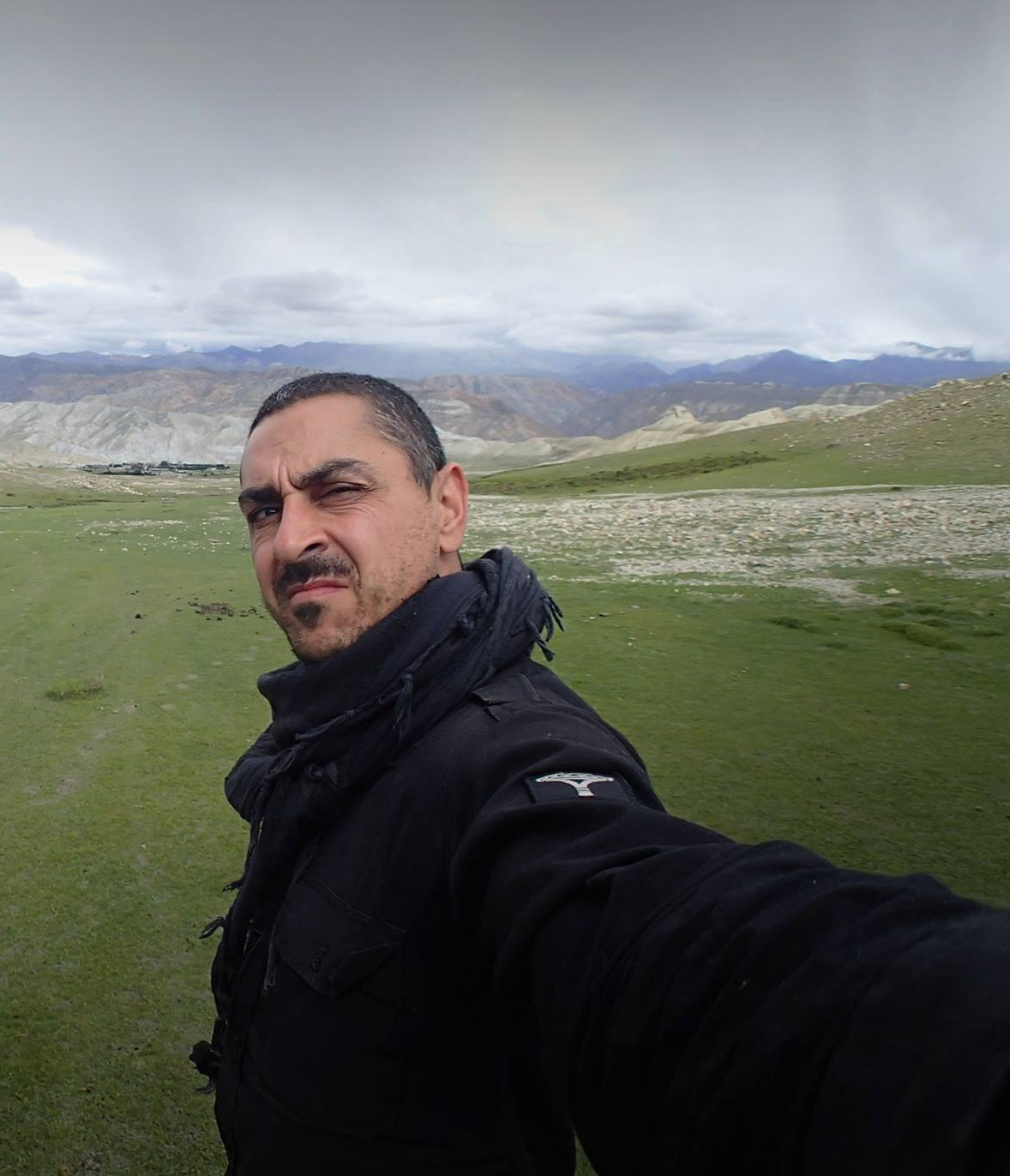
- Alizad in 2014
- Born: 12 January 1971 (age 55); Tehran, Iran
- Occupations: TV host, TV producer, tailor
- Years active: 2001–present

Arman Alizad (born 12 January 1971) is an Iranian-Finnish master tailor, fashion columnist, keynote speaker and TV personality. He is best known for the martial arts series Kill Arman, which has aired in over 100 countries around the world. Alizad has also hosted several other Finnish TV series, such as Dresscode, Unisex, Loman Tarpeessa and Arman Reilaa.

== Early life ==
Alizad was born in Tehran, Iran, in 1971. At the start of the 1979 Islamic revolution, his family first relocated to the United States and eventually Finland, where his grandparents had been living. He has lived there ever since. As a child he enjoyed skateboarding and football.

== Tailoring career ==
Alizad graduated from a basic tailoring school in 1992, and became an apprentice to master tailor Jouni Korhonen. Alizad passed the master tailor's test in 1997.

He co-owns the Finnish Pukustudio clothing company with Sonja Raassina, one of the last remaining master tailors in Finland.

== TV career ==
Alizad started his television career with the fashion show Dresscode in 2001. Since then he has done another fashion show (Unisex), two travel shows (Loman Tarpeessa, Arman Reilaa), and one martial arts TV series, Kill Arman. His more recent series are Arman ja viimeinen ristiretki (Beyond Human Boundaries), 2013–) and Arman pohjantähden alla (Arman under the North Star, 2016–).

In Viimeinen ristiretki, he visits people and places that are completely outside "western culture". The show won the 2014 Golden Venla for best TV reality series and for Alizad as best performer.

In Pohjantähden alla he travels inside Finland to show things that others close their eyes to. This show won the Golden Venla for best documentary in 2017. Alizad won for best performer again in 2016 and 2017.

=== International fame ===
In 2009, Kill Arman made a distribution deal with the British TV distribution company DRG. Between 2009 and 2011, the series was sold to over 100 countries, making Alizad an internationally known TV personality. The series airs, for example, on BBC Knowledge, Extreme Sports Channel and Jim.

== Personal life ==
Alizad has three daughters. He is divorced, having been married twice.
