= FC Nerds =

Reality sports television franchise

- Created by: Palle Strøm; Keld Reinicke
- Original work: FC Zulu
- Owner: Nordisk Film
- Years: 2004–2008

Films and television
- Television series: FC Nerds (independent international versions, see below)

Miscellaneous
- Genre: Reality; Sports entertainment

FC Nerds is a reality television sports franchise developed by Nordisk Film that originated in Denmark in 2004 from the television program FC Zulu. The show follows a number of nerdy young men with no experience in playing association football being trained by a famous football player in order to face a football club in the country's highest national league after a few months.

The format has been nominated for the Rose d'Or and, in 2005, an International Emmy Award in the Non-Scripted Entertainment category.

Several international versions of the show spawned, including in Australia, Belgium, Finland, Germany, Iceland, the Netherlands, Norway, Spain and Sweden. Teams from these international versions would sometimes compete against the Danish FC Zulu team.

== International versions ==
Currently in production
No longer in production

| Country/Region | Local title | Network(s) | Coach(es) | Original run |
|---|---|---|---|---|
| Australia | Nerds FC | SBS TV | Andy Harper (series 1); Craig Foster (series 2) | 14 April 2006 – 4 August 2007 |
| Belgium | FC Nerds | VT4 | Johan Boskamp | 2 April – 21 May 2008 |
| Denmark | FC Zulu | TV 2 Zulu | Mark Strudal; TNT | 13 September 2004 – 30 October 2006 |
| Finland | FC Nörtit | Subtv | Atik Ismail | 2006 |
| Germany | Borussia Banana – Helden im Strafraum | RTL II | Lothar Matthäus | 6 September – 25 October 2005 |
| Iceland | Knattspyrnufélagið Nörd | Sýn | Logi Ólafsson; Ásmundur Haraldsson | 2006 |
| Netherlands | Atletico Ananas | Nederland 2 (BNN) | Peter van Vossen | 2005 |
| Norway | Tufte IL (part of Heia Tufte!) | TVNorge | Erik Thorstvedt; Klaus Pettersen | 2005 – 2006 |
| Norway | FK Zebra | TV 2 Zebra | Egil Olsen | 1 October – 19 November 2008 |
| Spain | Paketes FC | Unknown | Unknown | Unknown |
| Sweden | FC Z | ZTV; TV6 | Glenn Hysén; Richard Lidberg | 2005 – 2007 |
