= 51st International Emmy Awards =

2023 awards ceremony

- Promotional poster
- Date: November 20, 2023
- Location: New York Hilton Midtown; New York City, NY
- Presented by: International Academy of Television Arts and Sciences
- Hosted by: Rhys Darby

The 51st International Emmy Awards ceremony, presented by the International Academy of Television Arts and Sciences (IATAS), took place on November 20, 2023, at the New York Hilton Midtown in New York City, in recognition to the best television programs initially produced and aired outside the United States in 2022. Nominations were announced on September 26, 2023.

== Eligibility ==
The 51st International Emmy Awards Competition was opened for all categories December 7, 2022, and closed February 16, 2023.

== Ceremony information ==
Nominations for the 51st International Emmy Awards were announced on September 26, 2023, by the International Academy of Television Arts & Sciences (IATAS). There are 56 nominees across 14 categories and 20 countries. Nominees come from: Argentina, Australia, Brazil, Canada, Denmark, Finland, France, Germany, India, Israel, Japan, Mexico, Portugal, Qatar, South Africa, South Korea, Spain, Sweden, Turkey and the United Kingdom. All these programs were broadcast between January 1 and December 31, 2022; in accordance with the competition's eligibility period.

In addition to the presentation of the International Emmys for programming and performances, the International Academy presented two special awards. Succession creator and showrunner Jesse Armstrong received the 2023 Founders Award in honor of his life’s work. Ekta Kapoor, co-founder of Indian TV production powerhouse Balaji Telefilms, was honored with the 2023 International Emmy Directorate Award.

== Winners and nominees ==
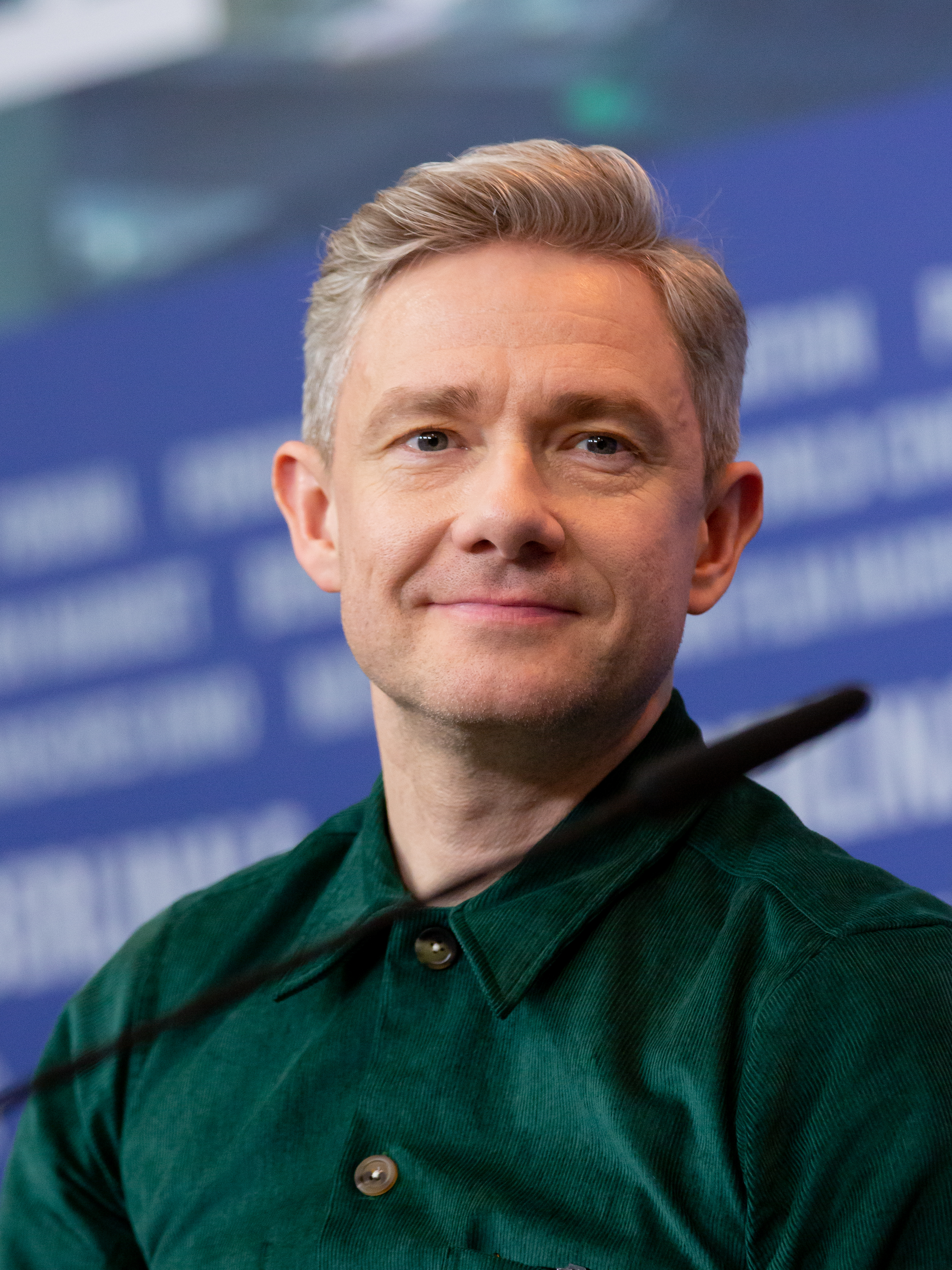
Martin Freeman, Best Actor winner

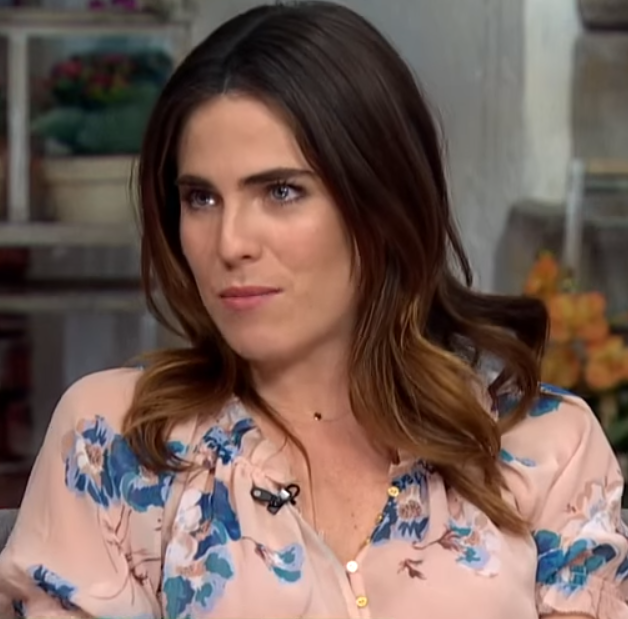
Karla Souza, Best Actress winner

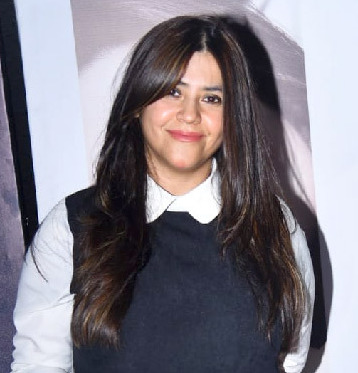
Ekta Kapoor, International Emmy Directorate Award recipient

The winners are listed first and in bold.

Best Drama Series	Best Comedy Series
**The Empress (Germany) (Sommerhaus Serien)**; Extraordinary Attorney Woo (Republic of Korea) (AStory/KT Studio Genie); Yosi, the Regretful Spy (Argentina) (Oficina Burman/Amazon); The Devil's Hour (United Kingdom) (Hartswood Films/Amazon)	**Derry Girls (United Kingdom) (Hat Trick Productions)**; **Vir Das: Landing (India) (Weirdass Comedy/Rotten Science)**; The Boss (Argentina) (Star+/Pegsa); Le Flambeau (France) (Entre 2 & 4/Making Prod)
Best Performance by an Actor	Best Performance by an Actress
**Martin Freeman as Chris Carson in The Responder (United Kingdom) (Dancing Ledge Productions)**; Gustavo Bassani as José Pérez / Yosi in Yosi, the Regretful Spy (Argentina) (Oficina Burman/Amazon); Jonas Karlsson as Tommy in Riding in Darkness (Sweden) (Jarowskij); Jim Sarbh as Dr. Homi J. Bhabha in Rocket Boys (India) (Culver Max Entertainment/Emmay Entertainment/Roy Kapur Films)	**Karla Souza as Mariel in Dive (Mexico) (Madam/Filmadora/Infity Hill/Amazon)**; Connie Nielsen as Karen Blixen in The Dreamer – Becoming Karen Blixen (Denmark) (Zentropa Episodes ApS/Viaplay/Belga/Stage 5); Billie Piper as Suzie Pickles in I Hate Suzie Too (United Kingdom) (Bad Wolf); Shefali Shah as DCP Vartika Chaturvedi in Delhi Crime (India) (SK Global Ent./Golden Karavan/Film Karavan)
Best TV Movie/Mini-Series	Best Telenovela
**Dive (Mexico) (Madam/Filmadora/Infity Hill/Amazon)**; Reborn Rich (Republic of Korea) (Raemongraein/SLL/ChaebolSPC/VIU); Infiniti (France) (Empreinte Digitale/Federation Ent. Belgique); Life and Death in the Warehouse (United Kingdom) (BBC Studios)	**Family Secrets (Turkey) (Ay Yapım)**; Cara e Coragem (Brazil) (TV Globo); Pantanal (Brazil) (TV Globo); Forever (Portugal) (Plural Entertainment)
Best Arts Programming	Best Documentary
**Buffy Sainte-Marie (Canada) (Eagle Vision/White Pine Pictures)**; Art Is Our Voice (Japan) (NHK); Los Tigres Del Norte: Historias Que Contar (Mexico) (Prime Video/Filmadora); Music Under the Swastika‚ The Maestro and the Cellist of Auschwitz (Germany) (3B-Produktion/Deutsche Welle)	**Mariupol: The People’s Story (United Kingdom) (Top Hat Productions/Hayloft Productions/BBC)**; Dossiê Chapecó – O Jogo Por Trás Da Tragédia (Brazil) (Warner Bros. Discovery/Pacha Films); Nazi Hunter – Journey into Darkness (Germany) (Spiegel TV); Witness: Serigne vs. The EU (Qatar) (Zungu/Al Jazeera English)
Best Short-Form Series	Best Non-Scripted Entertainment
**A Very Ordinary World (France) (Magneto Prod/Canal+)**; Lynchings (Brazil) (RecordTV); Man vs. Bee (United Kingdom) (RedRum Films); The Mandela Project (South Africa) (Paramount)	**A Ponte – The Bridge Brasil (Brazil) (Warner Bros. Discovery/Endemol Shine)**; The Time Hotel: Dalida (France) (Mediawan/Ardimages); Love by A.I. (Japan) (TBS Television/Smart Dog Media); The Great British Bake Off (United Kingdom) (Love Productions)
Best Sports Documentary	Kids: Animation
**Harley & Katya (Australia) (Stranger Than Fiction Films)**; 30 Dias Para Ganar (Mexico) (North Films/N+Docs/ViX+); Alexia: Labor Omnia Vincit (Spain) (You First Originals); Two Sides (South Africa) (T+W/Whisper Cymru)	**The Smeds and the Smoos (United Kingdom) (Magic Light Pictures)**; The Nutty Boy (Brazil) (Chatrone); Moominvalley (Finland) (Gutsy Animations); Rilakkuma's Theme Park Adventure (Japan) (Warf Studios/Field Management Expand)
Kids: Factual	Kids: Live-Action
**Built To Survive (Australia) (Butter Media/ABC/ACTF)**; Yard TV (Brazil) (Canal Futura); Takalani Sesame (South Africa) (Sesame Workshop/Pulp Films); Meet... Anne Frank (Germany) (Cross Media/IFAGE)	**Heartbreak High (Australia) (Fremantle/Newbe)**; Gudetama: An Eggscellent Adventure (Japan) (OLM, Inc.); Memory Forest (Israel) (TTV Production/Kan Educational/GPG/GMFF/Avi Chai Foundation/Maimonides Fund); Tierra Incognita (Argentina) (Disney+/Non Stop)

== Multiple nominations ==
Multiple nominations by country
Nominations	Country
9	United Kingdom
7	Brazil
4	Germany
4	Argentina
4	France
4	Mexico
4	Japan
3	India
3	South Africa
3	Australia
2	South Korea

== Multiple wins ==
Multiple wins by country
Wins	Country
4	United Kingdom
3	Australia
2	Mexico
