= 54th International Emmy Awards =

2026 awards ceremony

- Promotional poster
- Date: November 23, 2026
- Location: New York City, NY
- Presented by: International Academy of Television Arts and Sciences

The 54th International Emmy Awards ceremony, presented by the International Academy of Television Arts & Sciences (IATAS), will honor the best in international television programming from 2025. The awards ceremony is scheduled to take place on November 23, 2026, in New York City.

== Ceremony information ==
The nominations were announced on September 23, 2026, by the International Academy of Television Arts and Sciences. The United Kingdom led the nominations for the seventh year in a row, with fourteen, followed by Brazil with nine and Spain with five.

There are 64 nominees across 16 categories coming from 22 countries, these being: Argentina, Belgium, Brazil, Canada, Chile, China, France, Germany, India, Japan, Mexico, Netherlands, Norway, Philippines, Portugal, Qatar, Singapore, South Africa, South Korea, Spain, Türkiye, and the United Kingdom.

British-American businesswoman and Netflix's chief content officer Bela Bajaria will receive the International Emmy Founders Award, while Austrian businesswoman and Warner Bros. Discovery International's current president Gerhard Zeiler will be honored with the International Emmy Directorate Award.

== Categories presented ==
Best Drama Series	Best Comedy Series
(United Kingdom) A Thousand Blows (The Story Collective / Matriarch Productions / Water & Power Productions / Disney+); (France) Carême (Vvz / Shine Fiction / Apple TV); (Argentina) Menem (Claxson / Amazon MGM Studios); (India) Real Kashmir Football Club (Sony Liv / Jaya Entertainment / Oshun Entertainment)	(Argentina) Community Squad (K&S Films / Netflix); (United Kingdom) Man vs Baby (Housesitter Productions / Netflix); (Spain) Old Dog, New Tricks (Alea / Netflix); (India) Vir Das: Fool Volume (Zazu Production Inc / Netflix)
Best Performance by an Actor	Best Performance by an Actress
(Spain) Javier Cámara as Joserra in Jakarta (Buendía Estudios Canarias / Mediapro Canarias Slu / Movistar Plus+); (Argentina) Ricardo Darín as Juan Salvo in The Eternaut (K&S Films / Netflix); (South Africa) Ian Roberts as Dan Hart in A Kind of Madness (Wolflight); (United Kingdom) Bobby Schofield as Joe Mitchell in Unforgivable (La Productions)	(Belgium) Mona Mina Leon as Yasmine De Laet in Holy Sh!t (Fobic Films / Streamz); (Mexico) Bárbara Mori as Bárbara Anderson in Lucca's World (Woo Films / Netflix); (South Korea) Park Ji-hyun as Cheon Sang-yeon in You and Everything Else (Kakao Entertainment / Netflix); (United Kingdom) Sheridan Smith as Ann Ming in I Fought the Law (Hera Pictures / ITV1)
Best TV Movie/Mini-Series	Best Telenovela
(Spain) The Anatomy of a Moment (Movistar Plus+ / Dlo Producciones); (South Korea) Hyper Knife (The Walt Disney Company Korea / CJ ENM Studios / Blaad); (Brazil) Oxygen Masks Will Not Drop Down Automatically (Morena Filmes / Warner Bros. Discovery); (United Kingdom) Prisoner 951 (Dancing Ledge Productions Ltd for the BBC)	(Brazil) Garota do Momento (Globo); (Turkey) Leyla (Ay Yapım); (Turkey) Far Away (Ay Yapım); (Spain) Wild Valley (Studio Canal)
Best Arts Programming	Best Documentary
(Singapore) Copy + Paste + Steal (The Moving Visuals Co.); (Germany) The Talented Mr. F. (Neue Flimmer Gmbh / mdr / BR / Ard Kultur / Rbb / HR); (United Kingdom) Live Aid: When Rock 'n' Roll Took on the World (Brook Lapping, A Zinc Media Label); (Brazil) Uncredited – The Story of Passinho (Red Bull Media House / Capuri)	(United Kingdom) Louis Theroux: The Settlers (Mindhouse Productions); (Mexico) Marcial Maciel: The Wolf of God (Warner Bros. Discovery / Anima Films); (Singapore) One "Orphan" Every Hour (Mediacorp Pte Ltd); Addiction Criminals (Premières Lignes / France Télévisions)
Best Short-Form Series	Best Non-Scripted Entertainment
(Belgium) The Class of 2000 (De Mensen / DPG Media); (Brazil) Jornada da Vida: Rio Mekong (Globo); (Canada) PeopleWatching (Lapaire Productions / Cutting Class Media / Lakeside Animation); (Japan) Tatsuki Fujimoto 17-26 (Avex Pictures)	(China) Ed Stafford's Rite of Passage (Bilibili / Warner Bros. Discovery / Arrow Media / Beach House Pictures); (United Kingdom) Educating Yorkshire 2 (Twofour); (Mexico) The Worst Trip Around the World (Non Stop México / Disney+); (France) Werewolves (Jaad Productions / Presque Prod)
Best News	Best Current Affairs
(Brazil) Fantástico: "Isolated in the Amazon" (Globo); (Portugal) Remember Me (TVI); (Qatar) Missing In Gaza (Al Jazeera Arabic Channel); (United Kingdom) Sky News: "The World: 24 Hours in the Kill Zone" (Sky News)	(Qatar) Al Jazeera Investigates: "Hasina: 36 Days in July" (Al Jazeera English & Journalist Zulkarnain Saer Khan); (France) Arte Reportage: "My Father's Hair" (Keyi Productions / Arte G.E.I.E.); (United Kingdom) Exposure: "Breaking Ranks: Inside Israel's War" (Zandland / ITV1); (Brazil) Profissão Repórter: "Feminice" (Globo)
Best Sports Documentary	Kids: Animation
(Brazil) Baila, Vini (Conspiração / Netflix); (Spain) Time-Out (3cat (TV3) / El Terrat (The Mediapro Studio)); (South Africa) The Philipstown Wirecar Grand Prix (Giant Films); (United Kingdom) Tom Daley: 1.6 Seconds (Olympic Channel / Warner Bros. Discovery / Western Edge Pictures)	(Brazil) Jorel's Brother (Copa Studio / Cartoon Network Latin America); (Germany) Lena's Farm (Studio Film Bilder Gmbh / Minya Film & Animation / ZDF); (Japan) My Melody & Kuromi (Toruku From Wit Studio / Netflix); (United Kingdom) The Scarecrows' Wedding (Magic Light Pictures)
Kids: Factual	Kids: Live-Action
(United Kingdom) Horrible Science (Lion Television); (Japan) Mitateru-Phose: Let’s Change Perspectives! (NHK / NHK Educational Corporation); (Norway) Adventurous Noah (Fabeleaktiv); (Brazil) Senior_Szn (Globo)	(Chile) 31 Minutos: Calurosa Navidad (Amazon MGM Studios / Aplaplac); (Netherlands) Those Left Behind (Dark Alley Pictures / Bnn Vara / Black Bee Productions); (United Kingdom) Dexter Procter the Ten Year Old Doctor (Various Artists Limited / Terrible Productions); (Philippines) Love at First Spike (ABS-CBN Studios / iWant)
Directorate Award	Founders Award
Gerhard Zeiler	Bela Bajaria

== Multiple nominations ==
Multiple nominations by country
Nominations	Country
14	United Kingdom
9	Brazil
5	Spain
4	France
3	Argentina
3	Japan
3	Mexico
2	India
2	Singapore
2	Germany
2	Qatar
2	Belgium
2	South Africa
2	Turkey
2	South Korea
