= Knattspyrnufélagið Nörd =

- Created by: Bjarni Haukur Þórsson; Anna Katrín Guðmundsdóttir
- Starring: Logi Ólafsson; Ásmundur Haraldsson
- Country of origin: Iceland
- No. of episodes: 15

Production
- Running time: 38 Minutes

Original release
- Network: Sýn
- Release: 31 August 2006 – present

KF Nörd (lit. 'FC Nerd'; KF stands for Knattspyrnufélagið [ˈkʰnahtˌspɪ(r)tnʏˌfjɛːˌlaijɪð], which means "the football club") is an Icelandic television program on Sýn of the FC Nerds format. It is a television show about 16 Icelandic nerds—selected out of the nerds of Iceland, and trained to their physical peaks—who compete with the winners of Landsbankadeildin (Icelandic Premier League in Football, won most recently by Fimleikafélag Hafnarfjarðar). It first aired on 31 August 2006.

== 2006 Squad ==
- 1. Ragnar Elías Ólafsson
- 2. Björn Elíeser Jónsson
- 3. Davíð Fannar Gunnarsson
- 4. Ingþór Guðmundsson
- 5. Hilmar Kristjánsson
- 6. Einar Örn Ólafsson
- 7. Guðni G. Kristjánsson
- 8. Ágúst Hlynur Hólmgeirsson
- 9. Þórarinn Gunnarsson
- 10. Vilhjálmur Andri Kjartansson
- 11. G. S. Ólafsson
- 12. Ívan Þór Ólafsson
- 13. Tandri Waage
- 14. Kári Gunnarsson
- 15. Hermann Fannar Gíslason
- 16. Kristján Helgi Benjamínsson
