= International Emmy Award for Best Short-Form Series =

Television award category

- Country: United States
- Presented by: International Academy of Television Arts and Sciences
- First award: 2017
- Currently held by: The Mediator; Canada (2025)
- Website: www.iemmys.tv

The International Emmy Award for Best Short-Form Series is presented by the International Academy of Television Arts & Sciences (IATAS) to the best short-form series (also known as web series) produced and initially aired outside of the United States. The award was first announced in 2016, and introduced at the 45th International Emmy Awards in 2017.

== Rules and regulations ==
According to the rules of the International Academy, a short-form series is "an original fiction or non-fiction episodic program, with episodes under a half-hour TV time slot".

In order to quality for the category, the program must be less than 20 minutes in length. If episodes are between 10 and 19 minutes long, two episodes must be submitted, while if the episodes are under 10 minutes long, three episodes are needed for submission. Standalone shorts are not eligible for the award.

== Winners and nominees ==
=== 2010s ===
Year	English title	Original title	Production company/Network	Country
2017	The Braun Family	Familie Braun	Polyphon / ZDF	Germany
2017	Ahí Afuera		Studio + / Iconoclast	Argentina
2017	The Amazing Gayl Pile		LaRue Entertainment	Canada
2017	Crime Time	Crime Time - Hora de Perigo	Studio + / John Doe Productions/22H22	Brazil
2018	The Suspended Mourning	Una Historia Necesaria	Tridi Films / CNTV / Escuela de Cine de Chile	Chile
2018	How to Buy a Baby		LoCo Motion Pictures	Canada
2018	Adulthood	L'âge adulte	Productions Pixcom	Canada
2018	Sensible Life of Director Shin	신감독의 슬기로운 사생활	72Seconds	South Korea
2019	Hack the City		Fox Lab Brazil / Yourmama	Brazil
2019	dxyz		72Seconds	South Korea
2019	wingman	Luottomies	Yle	Finland
2019	Wrong Kind of Black		Princess Pictures	Australia

=== 2020s ===
Year	English title	Original title	Production company/Network	Country
2020	#martyisdead		Bionaut / MALL.TV / cz.nic	Czech Republic
2020	Content		Ludo Studio	Australia
2020	One Thousand Hands for Argentina	Mil manos por Argentina	Storylab / Atomic Lab / Flow	Argentina
2020	People Like Us		Cheo Pictures / Pilgrim Pictures	Singapore
2021	INSiDE		Luminous Beast	New Zealand
2021	Beirut 6:07		Shahid / Imagic	Lebanon
2021	Diário de Um Confinado		Globoplay	Brazil
2021	People Talking	Gente hablando	Set Màgic Audiovisual / Atresmedia	Spain
2022	Rūrangi		Autonomouse / The Yellow Affair	New Zealand
2022	Pioneer Spirit	Espíritu pionero	TV Pública	Argentina
2022	Fly on the Wall		Al Jazeera	Qatar
2022	Santas in the Hay	Nissene i bingen	Seefood TV	Norway
2023	A Very Ordinary World	Des Gens Bien Ordinaires	Magneto Prod / Canal+	France
2023	Lynchings		RecordTV	Brazil
2023	Man vs. Bee		RedRum Films	United Kingdom
2023	The Mandela Project		Paramount	South Africa
2024	Point of No Return	Punt de no Retorn	TV3 Catalonia	Spain
2024	Our Lives	La vida de nosotras	BTF Media / CNTV / TVN	Chile
2024	Kweens of the Queer Underground		Sydney Production Company / ABC / Create NSW	Australia
2024	Say Hello to Kenshiro	犬白 に よろしく	DMM.com / So-ket	Japan
2025	The Mediator	La médiatrice	KOTV	Canada
2025	Beyond Dancing		Radio Television Hong Kong	Hong Kong
2025	My Dead Mom		LoCo Motion Pictures	Canada
2025	Change is Everything	Todo se transforma	Warner Bros. Discovery / Buffalo Producciones	Argentina
2026	The Class of 2000	De Klass van 2000	De Mensen / DPG Media	Belgium
2026	Jornada da Vida: Rio Mekong		Globo	Brazil
2026	PeopleWatching		Lapaire Productions / Cutting Class Media / Lakeside Animation	Canada
2026	Tatsuki Fujimoto 17-26	藤本タツキ 17–26	Avex Pictures	Japan

== See also ==
- List of International Emmy Award winners
