= Nerds FC =

- Nerds FC program logo
- Starring: Series 1 Cast; Series 2 Cast
- Country of origin: Australia
- No. of episodes: 17 (list of episodes)

Production
- Running time: 25 minutes approx.
- Production company: Grundy Television (2006) Fremantle Media (2007)

Original release
- Network: SBS
- Release: 14 April 2006 – 4 August 2007

Nerds FC is an Australian television documentary featuring football. The first series of the show was aired as a lead-in for the 2006 FIFA World Cup on the Special Broadcasting Service network that featured coverage of the Australian national soccer team.

The show follows a football team of 14 nerds who were trained over 3 months, climaxing with a match against a professional team. Nerds FC is produced by SBS independent and Grundy Television (which has now merged with Crackerjack to become FremantleMedia Australia).

Nerds FC's format, FC Nerds, is based on the Danish reality TV hit FC Zulu.

The first series aired on Australian TV from 14 April 2006, encored from 8 June 2006, and encored again from 21 April 2007. The DVD for the first series was released on 6 June 2007.

The second series aired from 9 June 2007. The DVD for the second series was released on 16 August 2007.

== Cast ==
The team was specifically selected to have little to no knowledge of football, and also little physical ability or aptitude for the game. To find such individuals, ads were placed in local university newspapers and internet chat rooms seeking 18- to 25-year-old men, Could you be described as an intelligent geek? Do you bore your friends with technical, scientific or obsessional details? Grundy Television wants you!

The aim of the program is to build a group of nerds into a side, able to play with reasonable ability against (semi) professional teams, give some nerds a physical challenge, and to make a TV program.

Unlike other reality television series, the team was meant to bond and produce a cohesive group that was capable of excellent results. There is no 'voting off' or winner, or strategic plotting against fellow participants, the team participates as a whole.

== Vodcasts ==
Released shortly after each episode is aired the vodcasts include commentary and extra information from some of the nerds. They can be downloaded from the Australian iTunes Music Store.

== Series 1 ==
Nerds FC
- Full name: Nerds FC Season 1
- Founded: 2006
- Ground: Wentworth Park
- Capacity: Unknown
- Coach: Andy Harper
Home colours

=== Squad ===
Name	Position	Nerd Interest(s)
Timothy Weston	Left wing	a 'performer', collects Warhammer Fantasy models Member of the Sutekh society at Sydney Uni
Joseph Gentle	Right wing	computing, especially Artificial Intelligence and gaming (World of Warcraft)
John Truong	Right wing	Mechatronics Space engineer, physicist and mathematician; astronomy; Dragon Ball Z
Jack Mackey	Centre midfield	Knows 'Things', Solipsist, science
David Smith	Centre midfield(Captain)	Computers; restoring classic cars, notably a 1969 MG-B; preparing a Mitsubishi Lancer for car rallying.
Robin Chow ('Nature')	Left back	computer gaming (Warcraft III, Game Boy Advance, Diablo 2).
Nick Sifniotis	Left back	Arcane branches of mathematics, ability to do arithmetic in base 17. Accounting. Composing music.
Marika Deku	Centre back	Linguistics (ancient languages and their forms of writing), music (plays flute and piccolo)
Daniel Jones	Centre back	Politics and Philosophy. Anti-VSU activist, reporter for Honi Soit
Phillip Massaad ('Mono')	Right back	A bookworm, especially about historical ships and just about anything that floats, floated or sank. Other interests include airships, aeroplanes, locomotives and architecture.
Som Guan	Striker	computers (gaming), music (playing piano and guitar), theatre (performing), public speaking. Computer Systems Engineering student.
Phillip Lathourakis	Striker	ten pin bowling, playing the piano and GameCube
Tim Kirk ('Captain')	Striker	History, notably "the influence of nostalgia, historical kitsch, the theatre and pageantry of political expression and historical political satire and commentary"; Linguist; intern for The Cato Institute, 2004
Trent Apted	Goalkeeper	Computer Science PhD student, mainly involving "a toolkit for learning and adapting personalised gestures for ubiquitous computing interfaces." Trent's academic home page
Andy Harper	Coach	Spawning Salmon
Milan Blagojevic	Assistant Coach	none disclosed (nor likely)

=== Strip ===
The Nerds FC Season 1 strip was Royal Blue with white piping at the sleeves and neck, with matching shorts and socks.

=== Training Ground ===
The Nerds FC training ground is Wentworth Playing Grounds between Glebe and Pyrmont in Sydney.

=== Song and Video ===
The third episode saw the Nerds FC team in the 301 recording studio to make its team song, led by professional vocal trainer Erana Clark of Australian Idol fame.

The chorus of the song (and promotional video) is (in rhyme):

"We will enter history,
Failure to victory,
This team is proud to be
Nerds FC."

Watch the Promotional Video.

=== Games ===
The first game played by Nerds FC was against the "Young Matildas", the Australia women's national football (soccer) team under 21s football team. The score was 11:0 to the Young Matildas.

The fourth episode had the Nerds FC playing a game against a team of inmates in a prison. The score was 8:0.

The seventh episode featured a rematch against the Young Matildas. The score was 5:0.

The final 'professional' outing was against Melbourne Victory in front of 25,000 people as post-match entertainment for the 2006 A-League Semi-final between Adelaide United and Sydney FC. The score was 12:2.

=== Cameo appearances ===
- Episode 1: One of the Wiggles gives a "Go Nerds FC" cheer during the credits
- Episode 2: Anthony LaPaglia gives a "Go Nerds FC" cheer during the credits
- Episode 6: Blue Wiggle, Anthony Field, reveals his same-colour blue Nerds FC jumper underneath his Wiggles shirt and declares himself a fan.

== Series 2.0 – Nerds Upgraded ==
Nerds FC
- Full name: Nerds FC Season 2
- Nicknames: Nerds FC version 2.0; Nerds FC 2.0: Upgraded
- Founded: 2007
- Ground: Sydney Academy of Sports
- Capacity: Unknown
- Coach: Craig Foster
Home colours

=== Squad ===
Name	Nickname	Player No	Position	Nerd Interest(s)
Adam Pemberton	Goalie, Octopus, Silver Surfer, Thac0	1	Goal keeper	AD&D2, Soft drink can tab chainmail, Computer gaming
David Collien	Flash, Snake	4	Centre back	Building robots, playing the ukulele
Matt Chen	Chi Qui	2	Striker	Culture of Asia, Film, Computer Vision
Patrick Neumann	Paddy, Goon Warrior, Gooner	15	Defender	Aerospace engineering, The Society for Creative Anachronism and History
Matthew Rochford	Rochy (usually pronounced 'Rocky')	14	Midfielder	Cross dressing, social theory, Star Trek, text messaging, television static, poetry, installation art
Michael Lake		6	Midfielder/substitute	Apple fanatic, 3D Puzzles, RoboCup (rUNSWift 2006)
Ben Smith	βΣπ $mith	11	Left back/substitute	Memorised Pi to 486 decimal places, Aims to be a maths teacher, Anime
Rahul Prasad	Poodle	9	Right back	Collects stamps, butterflies and coins, popular culture
Glenn Leong	Strafe	7	Striker	Performing in UNSW Revues, Gaming (particularly PC oriented) and Anime Cosplay
Thomas Cunningham	Scout	12	Midfielder	MUD, Scouting – and he has a girlfriend, which he claims is an un-nerdy thing to do.
Gareth White	Ruby	8	Central midfield or 'number ten'	Rubik's Cube, mathematics, represented Australia at the 2002 International Mathematics Olympiad
Chris Anderson	-	13	Defender	Software Development, Piano, Magic, Poker, Art, Hypnotherapy
Felix Lawrence		3	Centre back	Coffee connoisseur, physics
Richard Merzian	Richie	10	Holding midfielder (Captain)	activism, environmentalism
Craig Foster	Fozzie		Coach	SBS Chief Football Analyst, football expert
Francis Awaritefe			Assistant Coach	Computer programmer

=== Strip ===
The Nerds FC Season 2 strip was yellow with black shoulder and collar stripe, black shorts, socks and shoes. The goalie wore a grey shirt, grey shorts, socks and shoes. In a radio interview on station 2SSR however, Adam (the Goalie) commented that the grey shoes were due to his large feet, not the goalie strip; and that he would have been wearing those shoes regardless of the position he was given.

=== Training ground ===
The training ground for season 2 is the Sydney Academy of Sport in Sydney.

=== Song and video ===
The team song for series 2 is a rock version of the previous season's song. The song features Australian Idol finalist Chris Murphy playing guitar and singing some solos and an orchestral backing in the final section of the piece. In addition to this, the rap in the middle is changed to fit with the interests of the series 2 nerds.

=== Games ===
In the first episode, the Nerds were taken to the Marconi Stallions ground to play the New South Wales Under 11's Elite Squad. The televised score was 6:0 to the Under 11's, however the final goal was disallowed to an offside penalty that was removed from the edit.

In episode three the Nerds played the Nerds FC team from Season 1. The original Nerds team won 3:0.

In episode four, the team was taken to Bluetongue Stadium to face a team of celebrities. The celebrities won 5:2.

In the fifth episode, the Nerds faced off against a team of military servicemen. The score was 2:0 to the military.

==== Final match ====
The final match was played on 27 February 2007 with the nerds playing an "International All-Star Team". The venue was Pittwater Park, Warriewood.

The curtain raiser was a match between the Nerds FC Series 1 and the New South Wales Under 11's Elite Squad.

== See also ==
- List of Australian television series
- List of programs broadcast by Special Broadcasting Service
