= List of Nerds FC episodes =

== Series 1 ==
Nerds FC first aired on Australian Television on 14 April 2006 and screened on SBS on Friday at 7:30pm. The show is 30mins.

The first series repeated its cycle from 8 June 2006 at 8 pm.

The first series repeated its cycle from 21 April 2007 at 5:30pm.

=== Episode 1 - From Nerd to Player ===
We meet the 14 nerds and learn that they are as comfortable on the ball as a fish is on a bicycle. The nerds meet their coach (Andy Harper) and his assistant (Milan Blagojevic) and train as a team for the first time at Wentworth Park before playing their first game against an opposition (Young Matildas) even they think they can beat.

=== Episode 2 - From Individual to Team ===
The team receive their kits and leave for a team bonding camp. They do several "get across the gap" challenges, then are divided into two groups and have 20 minutes to build a raft from planks, barrels, rope and gaffer tape. They then cross a creek and return to prove the rafts float. Almost unanimously (bar one) David Smith is elected as captain after displaying leadership during the team bonding activities.

=== Episode 3 - From Shy to Bold ===
The premise of this episode is that the Nerds FC need to have 'music': in essence, rhythm and rhyme. The Nerds FC team is taken to a dance studio to learn South American rhythms from a group of female dancers from Brazil. The Nerds FC is also taken to a recording studio and given words for their team song and sing parts of it, that are accompanied by a professional singer. A promotional video was also filmed. The dancers also appear in the promotional video. By the end of the episode, the Nerds FC is looking more fluid in their movements. In this episode we are introduced to the passions of Marika Deku, a linguist proficient in six languages including French, Italian, German, Latin, Japanese and English as well as developing his own languages with grammar and alphabet. Tim Kirk explains his love of political history and world leaders including his great admiration of Winston Churchill. He also displays his collection of European military uniforms including his East German Air force uniform.

=== Episode 4 - From Afraid to Brave ===
The Nerds FC have a trial match against a local Sydney prison team, from the John Morony Correctional Centre at Windsor. Up against a front row of convicted murderers, the Nerds have a physical match losing 6–0. John Truong is knocked out momentarily in a touch of poetic justice after boldly claiming to camera the pride he would feel getting into a fight with a prisoner even if he was injured. Timothy Weston the extroverted performer, is jokingly called a prisoner's little sister whom he resembles. In this episode we learn of John's passion for engineering, physics and Dragon Ball Z. After their loss, the Nerds FC share lunch with the prisoners who on camera appear a jovial group of young men who have pushed society's boundaries.

=== Episode 5 - From Mice to Men ===
Keen to change the Nerds from Boys to Men, Coach Andy Harper sends the boys on another trip to confront their fears and extend their comfort zones. In the Kangaroo Valley the Nerds (with difficulty) set up camp in tents and hike off into the bush. There they in turn climb a huge tree, to a platform to take a 'leap of faith' and try and catch a suspended bar. Robin Chow, a professed gamer obsessive is clearly out of his comfort zone, amongst the bush and wildlife. The next challenge after dinner is for the Nerds to trek around the bush along a rope blindfolded.

The next morning the Nerds abseil down a 60m cliff to climax their stay before being handed back to Andy Harper at the end of the episode.

In this episode, we learn the passion of Left Back Nick Sifniotis who enjoys playing the violin and is building a laser harp. Phillip Massaad Right Back also celebrates his 21st birthday in the episode with a Ship-printed cake representing his passion about historical ships.

=== Episode 6 - From Nerd to Beckham ===
To complement their new-found celebrity status, the Nerds have a fashion makeover. After a Celebrity Makeover -style wardrobe and hair day, the men are taken to a night club in Sydney where the leave the team bus and walk a red carpet with paparazzi, enter the "Minus 5 Ice Lounge", and find that their parents and "significant others" are in attendance.

=== Episode 7 - The Rematch ===
After weeks of training the Nerds FC have a rematch of a game played in episode 1 with the Young Matildas.

Trent's left hand injury is revealed to be a significant crack in a bone and, after everyone tries out as goalkeeper, he hands over the goalkeeper's gloves and yellow shirt to David (Team Captain).

The Nerds are a better team, according to the YMs. The YMs win this game by 6:0.

The Coach announces 9 days out that for their final game they will play Melbourne Victory.

The team prepares by viewing the training session of Sydney FC. They ask for tips, and the Sydney Coach, Pierre Littbarski, suggests that, like professional footballers, in the last 48 hours they must forget their girlfriends.

The Nerds FC is taken to Sydney Football Stadium 24 hours before the game. Coach Harper pointedly asks Trent whether he is able to play as Goalkeeper. Trent promises to put his body on the line, and protect the goals: "It's my temple - I can't let anything in there," he says.

=== Episode 8 - The Final Challenge ===
The show climaxes with Nerds FC preparing to battle the professional A League soccer team "Melbourne Victory".

The episode includes a mock TV pundit debate on SBS' The World Game, where Les Murray and Craig Foster debate the key players and tactics for Nerds FC, although both struggled to suppress their smirking in the staged debate.

== Series 2 ==
The second series began airing on Australian Television on 9 June 2007, screening on SBS on Saturdays at 7:30pm. The show will remain 30mins.

=== Episode 1 - From Nerd To Player ===
Saturday 9 June at 7.30pm SBS TV

A brand new team of Nerds has been recruited. They may be rocket scientists, mathematicians, computer programmers and environmental activists, but they remain confused about what to do with a soccer ball. Their new coaches are determined to prove the beautiful mind can take to the beautiful game and the immediately challenge them with their first ever game against a team of mighty mites.

=== Episode 2 - From Individual To Team ===
Saturday 16 June at 7.30pm SBS TV

The boys now have to learn to think about working as a proper sports team. The boys will have to learn to work together.

=== Episode 3 - The Yardstick ===
Saturday 23 June at 7.30pm SBS TV

In the history of the Nerds Football Club, not one victory has been recorded. Its time for that to change as our new Nerds get the chance to test themselves against the original Nerds FC side from last series. The old side is back and determined to show these "newbies" a thing or two about the beautiful game.

=== Episode 4 - From Unknown To Famous ===
Saturday 30 June at 7.30pm SBS TV

The journey for the Nerds from anonymous introverted students to inspirational television celebrities means our boys need to get used to the spotlight. So the time has come for them to mingle with some of Australia's famous faces, but not at some cocktail party or PR function. They will meet on the football pitch against a celebrity team in a match for charity. Will star power stall the Nerds from scoring their first ever goal? After the match, one of their opponents decides to re-audition the boys, for something far more nerve-racking than scoring a goal.

=== Episode 5 - From Afraid To Brave ===
Saturday 7 July at 7.30pm SBS TV

The Nerds team is only weeks away from playing a team of All Star Internationals, but are they tough and disciplined enough? Not yet, according to the coaches, so the team is challenged to an Army Boot camp. And you thought the jail team was tough; just wait till you meet the new team's next opponents.

=== Episode 6 - Outside The Comfort Zone ===
Saturday 14 July at 7.30pm SBS TV

How do you prepare a Nerd to take on a challenge that is far removed from anything they could ever imagine experiencing? Well for starters, take them away from everything that brings them comfort; like their computers, their air conditioning and their beds. The trip the team is about to embark on will change the way they look at their lives and culture forever.

=== Episode 7 - From Boys To Men ===
Saturday 21 July at 7.30pm SBS TV

They may have improved their fitness and football skills, the Nerds could be better balanced. To improve in this area, they will embark on a unique two-pronged challenge. The first part would take them into a ballet studio and with the second, into the surf of Manly.

=== Episode 8 - From Nerds To Becks ===
Saturday 28 July at 7.30pm SBS TV

Being passionate about studying and arcane interests often doesn't allow Nerds much time to worry about styling or personal grooming. With the impending big final game and the public scrutiny that goes with it, the time has come to improve their overall presentation.

=== Episode 9 - The Final ===
Saturday 4 August at 7.30pm SBS TV

Their boots are laced, their uniforms are clean and their skills are at their peak - well we hope. Was three months of training long enough to turn these nerds into soccer players? Nerds FC is put to their ultimate test, playing a team of All Star Internationals in a stadium packed full of fans. This is it!
