= The Battle for Bangladesh =

- Created by: BBC World Service, BBC Bangla
- Narrated by: Riddhi Jha
- Original language: English

Production
- Production locations: Bangladesh, United Kingdom
- Editor: Christopher Giles
- Running time: 35:44
- Production company: BBC

Original release
- Network: BBC World Service
- Release: 9 July 2025

The Battle for Bangladesh is a documentary by BBC World Service and BBC Bangla. The film revealed, using digital investigation methods, permission was given by former Bangladeshi prime minister Sheikh Hasina to use lethal weapons on protesters.

== Background ==
A large number of protesters were killed during the 2024 anti-government protest in Bangladesh. The previous Awami League led-government dismissed that police forces were behind such deaths. The Awami league-led government fell on August 5, 2024. Few audio call recordings were leaked online by anonymous sources. These calls included a conversation of Sheikha Hasina with security officials permitting use of lethal weapons.

== Content ==
BBC Eye Investigations obtained leaked recordings and shared them with Earshot to verify. Earshot ascertained the audio recordings were authentic. The film also mapped police brutality around Dhaka, especially at Jatrabari Police Station on August 5. It presented visual evidence, previously not reported, by portraying police officials firing on crowds that resulted in deaths.

== Reaction ==
In a right of reply letter in the documentary an Awami League spokesman dismissed claims that Sheikh Hasina ordered shootings and said they were not able to confirm if audio recordings were real.

However, following broadcasting of the documentary Awami League denied any spokesperson's comment appeared on the documentary.

Amnesty International appraised the documentary and urged the government to hold perpetrators accountable. It also told the government refer cases to the International Criminal Court.

== See also ==
- Hasina: 36 Days in July

== Read also ==
- "বিবিসির অনুসন্ধানে ৫ই অগাস্ট ঢাকার যাত্রাবাড়ীতে পুলিশি হত্যাকাণ্ডের যে চিত্র উঠে এসেছে". BBC News বাংলা (in Bengali). 2025-07-09.
- "শেখ হাসিনার ফাঁস হওয়া গুলির নির্দেশের অডিও রেকর্ড যেভাবে যাচাই করেছে বিবিসি". BBC News বাংলা (in Bengali). 2025-07-09.
- BBC World Service (2025-07-08). The Battle for Bangladesh: Fall of Sheikh Hasina - BBC World Service Documentaries – via YouTube.
