= Zulkarnain Saer Khan =

Bangladeshi journalist

- জুলকারনাইন সায়ের খান
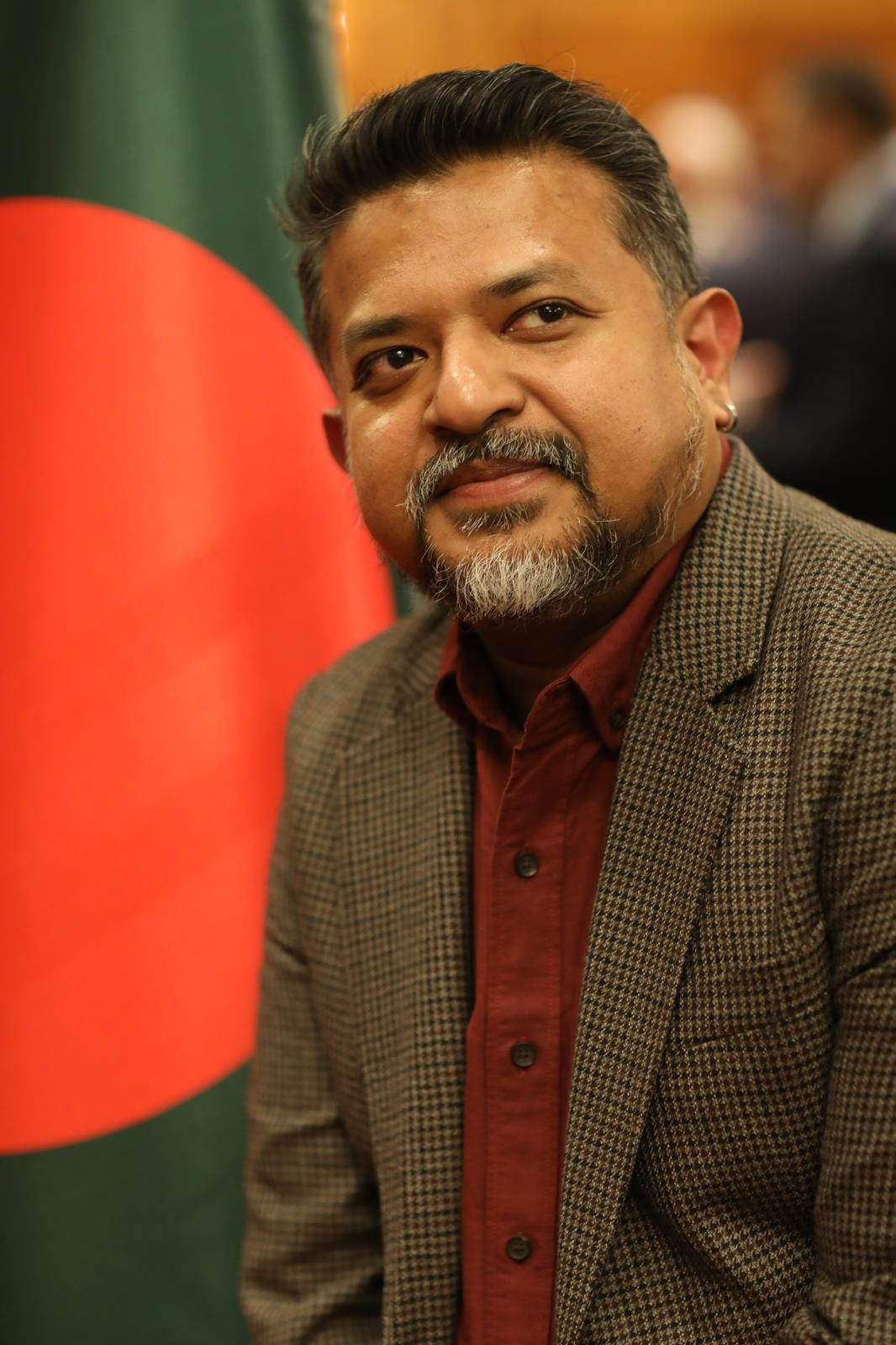
- Khan in 2026
- Other name: Sami
- Occupation: Journalist
- Known for: Investigative journalism
- Notable work: All the Prime Minister's Men
- Movement: Student–People's uprising (online activism)
- Awards: Global Shining Light Awards (2023); Best DIG Investigative (Medium) Award (2025); Amnesty International UK Media Awards 2022; 54th International Emmy Awards

Zulkarnain Saer Khan Sami is a U.K.-based exiled Bangladeshi journalist and a member of Al Jazeera's Investigative Unit. He is a researcher at Organized Crime and Corruption Project Reporting. He had risen to fame after working on and appearing in Al Jazeera's widely discussed 2021 documentary All the Prime Minister's Men. He won Global Shining Light Awards at GIJC23 by Global Investigative Journalism Network for his work at Secret prisoners of Dhaka. His Hasina: 36 Days in July, an investigative documentary film has been nominated for 54th International Emmy Awards in Current Affairs category.

== Career ==
Khan is working with several prominent media organisations worldwide, including Al Jazeera's Investigative Unit (I-Unit), Netra News, Haaretz, and the Organized Crime and Corruption Reporting Project to produce comprehensive investigative reports on Bangladesh.

In 2021, the Counter Terrorism and Transnational Crime unit of the Bangladeshi police charged Zulkarnain Saer Khan alias Sami and six others in a case filed under the 2018 Digital Security Act for "spreading rumours and carrying out anti-government activities". The Digital Security Act was alleged to be used in Bangladesh to crack down on political dissent and investigative journalism.

In March 2023, Khan's brother Mahinur Khan was beaten with iron rods by four unidentified men while out grocery shopping in the Shewrapara, a neighbourhood of Dhaka. The US Embassy in Bangladesh and UN special rapporteur on the situation of human rights defenders requested a probe into alleged attack.

=== The Minister's Millions ===
In September 2024, Al Jazeera's Investigative Unit published a documentary on former land minister of Bangladesh Saifuzzaman Chowdhury. Zulkarnain, the lead investigator of the documentary titled The Minister's Millions said Chowdhury has built a property empire worth at least $675 million, with plush properties in the UK, the US and the UAE. Authorities in Bangladesh have frozen his bank accounts and are now investigating claims that Chowdhury laundered millions of dollars into the UK. The Minister's Millions," has been awarded with the Best DIG Investigative (Medium) Award at the prestigious DIG Festival 2025 in Modena, Italy!

=== The Mother and the Monster ===
In May 2025, Al Jazeera published a documentary The Mother and the Monster, part of the 101 East series, which delves into Bangladesh's political landscape following the tenure of Prime Minister Sheikh Hasina. As a lead investigator Zulkarnain investigates the nation's trajectory after Hasina's leadership, examining the challenges and prospects that lie ahead. It features interviews with key figures, including The Chief Advisor Muhammad Yunus and The Chief of Army Staff Wakaruzzaman. The documentary aims to shed light on the complexities of Bangladesh's governance and the implications for its citizens in a post-Hasina era.

=== 36 Days in July: Sheikh Hasina's secret orders revealed ===
Khan has obtained covertly recorded phone calls that reveal how the former prime minister of Bangladesh, Sheikh Hasina, ordered the use of lethal force to crack down on student protesters during the July Uprising in 2024. This investigative programme was aired on Al Jazeera English tells the inside story of Sheikh Hasina's final days in the summer of 2024 as a bloody protest swept through Bangladesh and ended a political dynasty. It includes eyewitness accounts, investigations, photographs and analysis. In 2026, Hasina: 36 Days in July has been nominated in the Current Affairs category at 54th International Emmy Awards alongside productions from France, the United Kingdom and Brazil.
