= Kamiel =

Kamiel is a surname and a given name. Notable people with the name include:

== Given name ==
- Kamiel Bonneu (born 1999), Belgian racing cyclist
- Kamiel De Bruyne (born 1992), Belgian television producer
- Kamiel Buysse (1934–2020), Belgian racing cyclist
- Kamiel Callewaert (1866–1943), Belgian Catholic priest and historian
- Kamiel Dierckx (1942–2026), Belgian basketball player
- Kamiel Van Dooren (born 1936), Belgian rower
- Kamiel De Graeve (born 1906), Belgian racing cyclist
- Kamiel Maase (born 1971), long-distance runner from the Netherlands
- Kamiel Van de Perre (born 2004), Belgian professional footballer
- Kamiel Reynders (born 1931), Belgian former swimmer
- Kamiel Segers (1900–1964), Belgian racing cyclist
- Kamiel Verschuren (born 1968), Dutch conceptual interdisciplinary visual artist

== Surname ==
- Deanna Kamiel (1946–2018), Canadian-born director and professor of film development
