= SYN =

Syn or SYN may refer to:

== In arts and entertainment ==
=== In music ===
- The Syn, a band
- Synyster Gates, lead guitarist of the band Avenged Sevenfold

=== Fictional characters ===
- Doctor Syn, in novels by Russell Thorndike

=== Other uses in arts and entertainment ===
- Sýn (media corporation), a major media and telecommunications organization based in Iceland.
- SYN Media, a youth media organization based in Melbourne, Australia
- SYN (radio station), a youth radio station run by SYN Media

== In science and technology ==
- Syn addition, in organic chemistry
- Syn conformation in alkane stereochemistry
- Syndal railway station, Melbourne
- Synonym (taxonomy), a system of accepted alternative names for species
- SYN (TCP), synchronise packet in transmission control protocol (TCP)
- Synchronous idle (␖), one of the C0 and C1 control codes
- SYN (OSC), a standardized namespace within Open Sound Control

== Other uses ==
- Syn (goddess), in Norse mythology
- Coalition of Left, of Movements and Ecology (Synaspismós, abbreviated SYN or ΣΥΝ), a Greek political party
