= Restaurant Misverstand (Belgium) =

- Genre: Reality show
- Created by: Shiro Oguni
- Based on: The Restaurant That Makes Mistakes
- Presented by: Dieter Coppens
- Country of origin: Belgium
- Original language: Dutch
- No. of seasons: 3

Production
- Production companies: Roses Are Blue; Red Arrow

Original release
- Network: VRT

Restaurant Misverstand is a Belgian reality show based on a British format called The Restaurant That Makes Mistakes, which, in turn, was inspired by the Japanese experiment Restaurant of Mistaken Orders, by Shiro Oguni. The show is hosted by Dieter Coppens, with chef Seppe Nobels. The production also features the support of assistant chef Romina and specialist Anouck de Bruijn from the Dementia Expertise Center in Flanders.

In November 2024, the second season of the show won the International Emmy Award for Best Non-Scripted Entertainment category in New York.

== Format ==
The show aims to address the common misunderstanding faced by people with early-onset dementia, who are often forced to leave their jobs, leading to a loss of self-confidence. The program's goal is to change perceptions by showing what these individuals are still capable of achieving after the diagnosis.

== Awards and nominations ==
Year	Award	Category	Nominated	Result
2024	52nd International Emmy Awards	Best Non-Scripted Entertainment	Restaurant Misverstand	Won
