= Adotada =

2014 Brazilian reality television series

- Genre: Reality television
- Created by: Ernani Nunes; Maria Eugênia Suconic
- Starring: Maria Eugênia Suconic
- Country of origin: Brazil
- Original language: Portuguese
- No. of seasons: 4
- No. of episodes: 55

Production
- Running time: 60 minutes
- Production companies: Fremantle; Dinamo Filmes; Conspiração Filmes; Formata Produções

Original release
- Network: MTV Brasil
- Release: September 9, 2014 – July 18, 2017

Adotada is a Brazilian reality television series that aired on MTV Brasil starring Maria Eugênia Suconic. It is a spin-off of Papito in Love on which Maria previously gained fame for being ex-girlfriend of the singer Supla. The series consists in Maria being "adopted" by a different family each episode, then having to adapt to their routines and write them a letter containing her impressions from the experience before leaving and it ran from September 9, 2014, until July 18, 2017, over four seasons. The show has been nominated for the International Emmy Awards in the Non-Scripted Entertainment category.

== Cast ==
=== Main ===
- Maria Eugênia Suconic "Mareu"

=== Recurring ===
- Supla - ex boyfriend (Season 1)
- Cleber Tumasonis - best friend (Season 1)
- Érica Suconic - best friend and cousin (Season 1)
- Nilo Caprioli - best friend (Season 3–4)

== Episodes ==
Season	Episodes	Originally aired	
Season	Episodes	Season premiere	Season finale
1	13	September 9, 2014	December 2, 2014
2	12	May 12, 2015	July 28, 2015
3	12	March 29, 2016	August 2, 2016
4	14	April 11, 2017	July 18, 2017
5	10	November 3, 2020	

== Awards and nominations ==
Year	Association	Category	Nominee(s)	Result	Ref.
2016	International Emmy Award	Non-Scripted Entertainment	Adotada	Nominated	
