= Sorry voor alles =

Television show

- Also known as: Sorry About That
- Genre: Hidden Camera Reality game show
- Created by: Kamiel De Bruyne
- Presented by: Adriaan Van den Hoof
- Theme music composer: Daniel Pemberton
- Opening theme: Take You Down
- Country of origin: Belgium
- Original language: Dutch
- No. of seasons: 2
- No. of episodes: 13

Production
- Running time: 60 minutes
- Production company: Warner Bros. International Television Production

Original release
- Network: VRT
- Release: 4 September 2016 – 14 January 2018

Related
- The Netherlands

Sorry voor alles (English: Sorry about that) is a Belgian Dutch-language hidden camera game show.

Premiering 4 September 2016 on Eén, the series has been critically and commercially successful, with its first season having an average ratings share of 47%. In 2017, it won the International Emmy Award for Best Non-Scripted Entertainment, while its format has been sold to other countries.

== Format ==
With the help of their family, friends, and celebrities, am unsuspecting participant is set up in various unusual situations over a 30-day period by the programme's staff, captured via hidden cameras. Afterwards, the participant is brought onto a game show, where they learn that they had been set up, and can win prizes by answering questions pertaining to the events that had transpired.

During the first segment, the contestant learns that a failed casting interview they had participated in for a different, fictitious programme had actually been used to collect information about how they behave in specific situations. This is followed by a segment where the contestant must answer questions whose answers had been disclosed at points during the period. In the next segment, a three-member panel predicts the contestant's actions during various humorous situations. The contestant is then challenged to correctly identify events that occurred during the period, mixed among those which did not. In the final round, the contestant is given a minute to answer true or false questions about the events.

== Reception ==
The show proved popular with audiences and was likened to The Truman Show; its debut attracted 1.2 million viewers, rising to 1.4 million by the sixth episode (half the TV watching population) and had an average market share of 47%. and has been renewed for a second season. It has also been awarded the New York Festival's Gold World Medal in the "Entertainment and Family Program" category and the Silver Intermedia Global Award at the World Media Festival in Hamburg, on 10 May 2017 The show also received the award for "Second Best Format" at the Eurovision Creative Forum in Berlin.

At the 45th International Emmy Awards, Sorry voor alles won the award for Best Non-Scripted Entertainment.

== International versions ==
A Dutch remake has been made for NPO 1 with Jan Smit as host.

A German version has been produced for ZDF, hosted by Steven Gätjen.

Country	Name	Host	Network	Date premiered
Germany	Sorry für alles	Steven Gätjen	ZDF	2019
Netherlands	Sorry voor alles	Jan Smit	NPO 1	2017

== Awards ==
Wins:

- 45th International Emmy Awards: Best Non-Scripted Entertainment
- New York Festivals International Television & Film Awards: Gold World Medal, Entertainment and Family Program
- Silver Intermedia Global Award at the World Media Festival in Hamburg, 10 May 2017
- The award for "Second Best Format" at the Eurovision Creative Forum in Berlin.
- Best Game Show in the 2018 Rose d'Or awards.

Nominations:

- C21 International Format Awards 2018 - studio-based gameshow
- Rockie Awards - Reality
- Vlaamse Televisiester 2017 - Beste presentator & Beste Entertainment Locatie
