= International Emmy Award for Best Non-Scripted Entertainment =

Television award category

- Awarded for: Best Non-Scripted Entertainment
- Country: United States
- Presented by: IATAS
- Currently held by: Shaolin Heroes; Denmark (2025)
- Website: www.iemmys.tv

The International Emmy Award for Best Non-Scripted Entertainment is presented by the International Academy of Television Arts and Sciences as part of the International Emmy Awards, given to the best non-scripted entertainment programs: "reality show", "game show" or gender programs, initially produced and aired outside the United States.

== Rules & Regulations ==
According to the rules of the International Academy, non-scripted entertainment programs are television program devoted primarily to entertain, or entertain and inform, with unscripted dialogue (i.e. reality show, variety show, game show, awards show, docu-reality, etc.). The program should fit the minimum format length of a televised half-hour time slot, only one episode can represent the series and multiple submissions from the same series are not permitted.

== Winners and nominees ==
=== 2000s ===
Year	English title	Original title	Production company/Network	Country
2003	Without Prejudice?		12 YardProductions / Channel 4	United Kingdom
2003	Caiga Quien Caiga		Cuatro Cabezas	Argentina
2003	Home on Their Own		ITV / London Weekend Television	United Kingdom
2003	Me lo Dices o Me lo Cuentas		Telemadrid / El Terrat	Spain
2004	Brat Camp		Channel 4	United Kingdom
2004	Caiga Quien Caiga		Cuatro Cabezas	Argentina
2004	Wife Swap		Channel 4	United Kingdom
2004	Greg Le Millionaire		Glem / Rocket Science Labs / Fox UK / TF1	France
2005	Top Gear		BBC Two	United Kingdom
2005	Caiga Quien Caiga		Cuatro Cabezas	Argentina
2005	Borat TV Special		Talkback Thames / Channel 4	United Kingdom
2005	FC Zulu		Nordisk Film	Denmark
2006	Ramsay's Kitchen Nightmares		Channel 4	United Kingdom
2006	Big Brother Brasil 6		Rede Globo	Brazil
2006	Supernanny		Channel 4	United Kingdom
2006	The Strict School of the Fifties		ZDF	Germany
2007	How Do You Solve a Problem like Maria?		BBC	United Kingdom
2007	Caiga Quien Caiga		Cuatro Cabezas	Argentina
2007	The Prison Choir	El coro de la cárcel	TVE	Spain
2007	Takeshi Kitano presents Comaneci University Mathematics		Fuji TV	Japan
2008	The Big Donor Show	De Grote Donorshow	Endemol / BNN	Netherlands
2008	Caiga Quien Caiga		Eyeworks Cuatro Cabezas	Argentina
2008	Canada's Next Great Prime Minister		CBC Television / Magna International	Canada
2008	Doors		Tokyo Broadcasting System	Japan
2009	The Phone		Park Lane TV Productions	Netherlands
2009	The Amazing Race Asia 3		Amazing Race Productions / ABC Studios / SPE Networks / Sony Pictures Television / ActiveTV Asia	Singapore
2009	Historia Extrema		The History Channel Latin America / Endemol Argentina	Argentina
2009	I'm a Celebrity…Get Me Out of Here!		ITV Studios	United Kingdom

=== 2010s ===
Year	English title	Original title	Production company/Network	Country
2010	Caiga Quien Caiga		Eyeworks Cuatro Cabezas	Argentina
2010	Heston's Feasts		Optomen Television / Channel 4	United Kingdom
2010	Remembering School		KRO / Screentime Entertainment	Netherlands
2010	Run for Money		Fiji TV / Fuji Creative Corporation	Japan
2011	The World's Strictest Parents		Twenty Twenty Television	United Kingdom
2011	The Master Show		KBS	South Korea
2011	El Hormiguero		7 y accion	Spain
2011	La Expedicion - Mas alla de lo imposible		RM 5TO Elemento Mexico / Zodiak Entertainment Group / Fundacion Teleton Mexico	Mexico
2012	The Amazing Race Australia		Seven Network / Active TV / ABC Studios	Australia
2012	The Challenger Muay Thai		Imagine Group / The Group Entertainment	Singapore
2012	El Hormiguero		7 y accion / Antena 3	Spain
2012	Planeta Extremo		TV Globo	Brazil
2013	Go Back to Where You Came From		SBS Television Australia / Cordell Jigsaw Productions	Australia
2013	MasterChef South Africa		Quizzical Pictures / Lucky Bean Media	South Africa
2013	Dear Neighbors Help Our Daughter Find Love		Keshet / Fuchsia Productions	Israel
2013	Reto al Chef 2		Foxtelecolombia	Colombia
2014	Educating Yorkshire		Twofour / Channel 4	United Kingdom
2014	MasterChef China	顶级厨师 / Dǐngjí Chúshī	Shanghai Dragon TV	China
2014	Missie Mosango		Geronimo Productions	Belgium
2014	O Infiltrado		The History Channel Latin America	Brazil
2015	50 Ways To Kill Your Mammy		Burning Bright Productions / Brown Bread Productions	United Kingdom
2015	Barones de la Cerveza		National Geographic Channel Latin America / Nippur Media	Argentina
2015	Flying Doctors		Geronimo	Belgium
2015	MasterChef South Africa		Quizzical Pictures / Lucky Bean Media	South Africa
2016	The Great Swedish Adventure	Allt för Sverige	Meter Television / SVT	Sweden
2016	Adotada		Formata Producoes / Estudio Sao Paulo	Brazil
2016	Gogglebox		Studio Lambert	United Kingdom
2016	I Can See Your Voice	너의 목소리가 보여 / Neoui moksoriga boyeo	CJ E&M / Signal	South Korea
2017	Sorry About That	Sorry voor alles	Warner Bros. International Television Production België	Belgium
2017	Escuela para Maridos Colombia		Fox Network Groups Latin America / Fox Telecolombia	Colombia
2017	Super Fan	Fan Pan Tae Super Fan	Workpoint Entertainment	Thailand
2017	Taskmaster		Avalon / Dave	United Kingdom
2018	Did You Get the Message?	Hoe Zal Ik Het Zeggen?	Shelter	Belgium
2018	Masterchef Australia		Endemol Shine Australia	Australia
2018	The Mask Singer		Thai Broadcasting Company	Thailand
2018	Top Chef Mexico		Sony Pictures Television de Mexico / Cinemateli	Mexico
2019	The Real Full Monty: Ladies' Night		Spun Gold TV / ITV	United Kingdom
2019	The Voice Argentina	La Voz... Argentina	Viacom / Telefe	Argentina
2019	Taboe		PANENKA / VRT / Eén	Belgium
2019	The Remix		Greymatter Entertainment	India

=== 2020s ===
Year	English title	Original title	Production company/Network	Country
2020	Old People's Home for 4 Year Olds		Endemol Shine Australia	Australia
2020	Canta Comigo		RecordTV / Endemol Shine	Brazil
2020	The Public Enlightenment	Folkeopplysningen	Teddy TV	Norway
2020	MasterChef Thailand		Heliconia H Group Company Limited	Thailand
2021	The Masked Singer		Bandicoot Scotland / ITV	United Kingdom
2021	That's Love	Da's Liefde!	Shelter	Belgium
2021	I-Land	아이랜드	CJ ENM / Studio Take One / Big Hit Entertainment	South Korea
2021	The Masked Singer	¿Quién es la máscara?	Televisa / EndemolShine Boomdog	Mexico
2022	Love on the Spectrum		Northern Pictures / ABC / Netflix	Australia
2022	The Voice Argentina	La Voz... Argentina	Viacom / Telefe	Argentina
2022	LOL: Last One Laughing Germany		Constantin Entertainment GmbH / Amazon	Germany
2022	Top Chef Middle East		NBCUniversal	United Arab Emirates
2023	A Ponte – The Bridge Brasil		Warner Bros. Discovery / Endemol Shine	Brazil
2023	The Time Hotel: Dalida	Hôtel du Temps: Dalida	Mediawan / Ardimages	France
2023	Love by A.I.		TBS Television / Smart Dog Media	Japan
2023	The Great British Bake Off		Love Productions	United Kingdom
2024	The Restaurant That Makes Mistake	Restaurant Misverstand	Roses Are Blue / Red Arrow / VRT	Belgium
2024	Anything Goes	Me caigo de risa	TelevisaUnivision	Mexico
2024	The Bridge	Die Brug	Red Pepper Pictures / kykNET	South Africa
2024	The Summit		Endemol Shine / Nine Network	Australia
2025	Shaolin Heroes		Metronome Productions / Banijay / TV 2 Danmark	Denmark
2025	Big Brother Canada		Insight Productions	Canada
2025	Love Is Blind: Habibi		Imagic / Netflix	United Arab Emirates
2025	The Masked Singer	¿Quién es la máscara?	TelevisaUnivisión / Endemol Shine Boomdog	Mexico
2026	Ed Stafford's Rite of Passage		Bilibili / Warner Bros. Discovery / Arrow Media / Beach House Pictures	China
2026	Educating Yorkshire 2		Twofour	United Kingdom
2026	The Worst Trip Around the World	La peor vuelta al mundo	Non Stop México / Disney+	Mexico
2026	Werewolves	Loups-Garous	Jaad Productions / Presque Prod	France
