= Dive (2023 film) =

- Written by: Mónica Herrera; Samara Ibrahim; Tatiana Mereñuk; María Renée Prudencio; Lucía Puenzo
- Directed by: Lucía Puenzo
- Starring: Karla Souza
- Country of origin: Mexico
- Original language: Spanish

Production
- Running time: 95 minutes
- Production companies: Amazon Studios; Madam X Filmadora Nacional; Infinity Hill

Dive (Spanish: La caída) is a sports drama film directed by Lucía Puenzo, released on Amazon Prime Video in 2022. Starring Karla Souza, the film's plot deals with instances of not only sexual but also psychological abuse within the world of sports.

The film won the awards for Best TV Movie or Miniseries and Best Performance by an Actress (for Karla Souza) at the 51st International Emmy Awards.

== Plot ==
Mariel (Karla Souza) fights for her last chance to compete in the Olympics as a diver. She faces some physical issues and a complicated relationship with her coach and partner. As some sordid revelations come to light, Mariel must question whether winning is truly her greatest dream.

== Cast ==
- Karla Souza ...Mariel
- Hernán Mendoza ...Braulio
- Dèja Ebergenyi ...Nadia
- Fernanda Borches ...Irene
- Claudia Lobo ...Carmen
- Enrique Singer ...Gerardo
- Mabel Cadena ...Analía
- Christian Vazquez ...Carlos
- María Renée Prudencio ...Dr. Pezet
- Francisco Pinochet Aubele ...Announcer Griego
- Ari Brickman ...Cuarenton
