= 52nd International Emmy Awards =

2023 awards ceremony

- Promotional poster
- Date: November 25, 2024
- Location: New York Hilton Midtown; New York City, NY
- Presented by: International Academy of Television Arts and Sciences
- Hosted by: Vir Das

The 52nd International Emmy Awards, presented by the International Academy of Television Arts and Sciences (IATAS), recognizes the best television programs initially produced and aired outside the United States in 2023. The winners were announced at an awards ceremony at the New York Hilton Midtown in New York City. Indian comedian Vir Das served as host for the ceremony.

Gaumont CEO Sidonie Dumas was honored with the International Emmy Directorate Award, while American writer-producer David E. Kelley received the International Emmy Founders Award.

== Eligibility ==
The 52nd International Emmy Awards Competition was opened for all categories December 12, 2023 and closed January 31, 2024.

== Ceremony information ==
The nominations were announced on September 19, 2024, by the International Academy of Television Arts and Sciences. There are 64 nominees across 16 categories coming from 24 countries, these being: Argentina, Australia, Belgium, Brazil, Bulgaria, Chile, Colombia, Denmark, France, Germany, India, Israel, Japan, Mexico, Netherlands, Poland, Qatar, Singapore, South Africa, South Korea, Spain, Thailand, Türkiye, and the United Kingdom.

== Winners and nominees ==
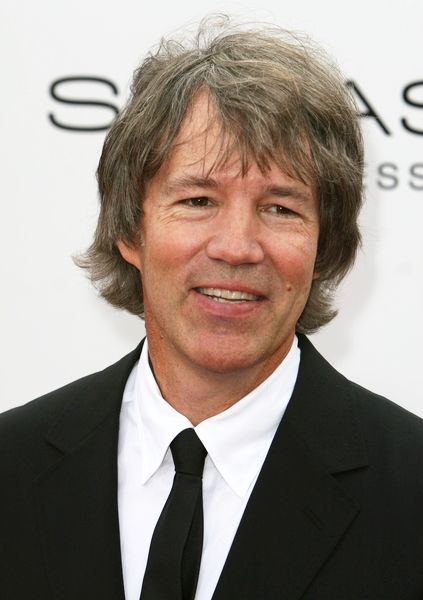
David E. Kelley, International Emmy Founders Award recipient

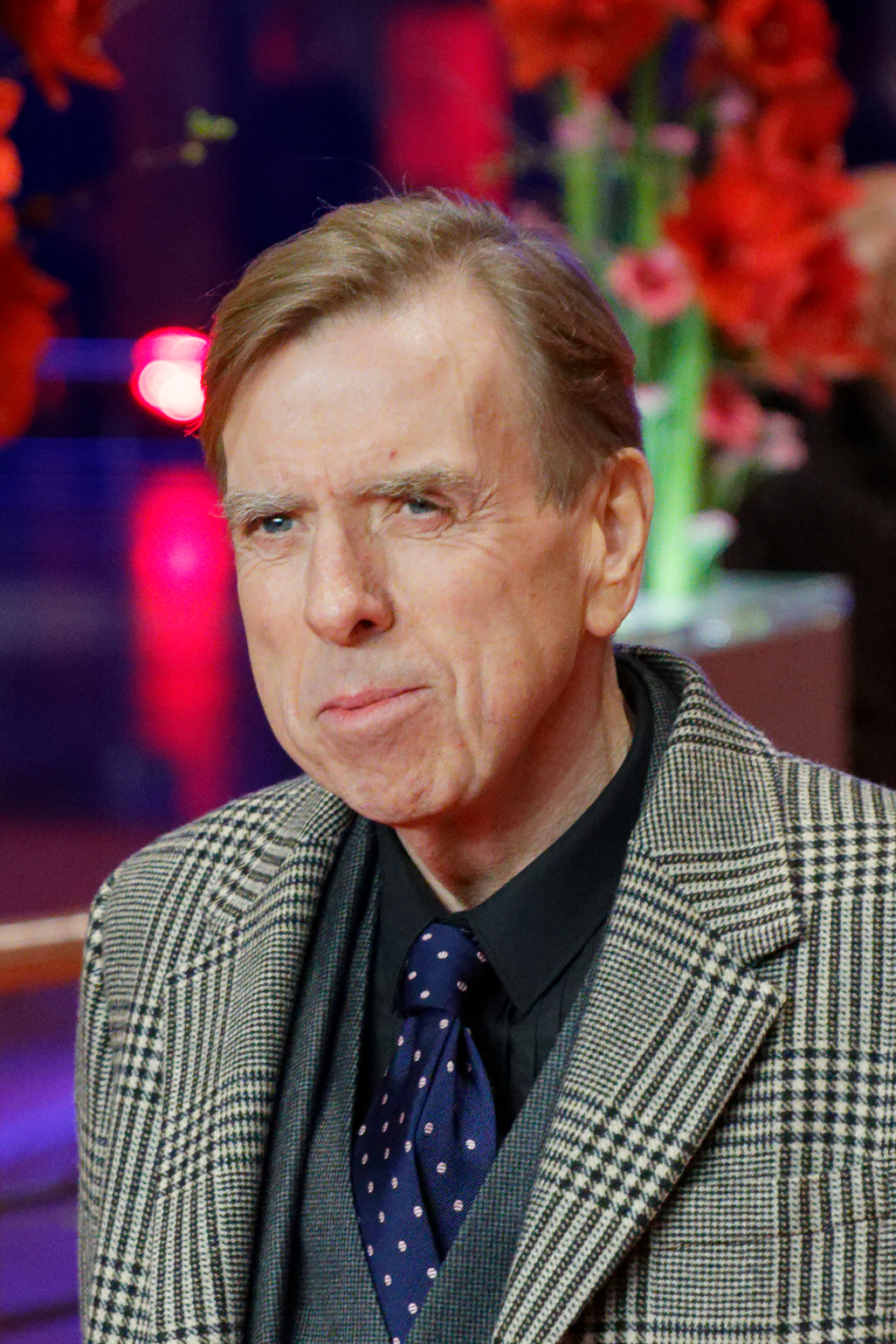
Timothy Spall, Best Actor winner

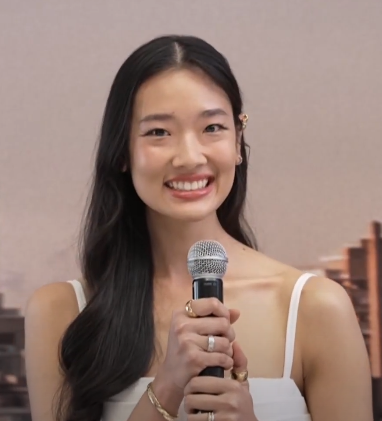
Chutimon Chuengcharoensukying, Best Actress winner

The winners will be listed in bold.

Best Drama Series	Best Comedy Series
(Japan) **Drops of God** (Legendary Entertainment / Les Productions Dynamic / 22H22 / Adline Entertainment / France Télévisions / Hulu); (Australia) The Newsreader (Werner Film Productions / Australian Broadcasting Corporation / eOne); (India) The Night Manager (Disney+ Hotstar / Banijay Asia / Ink Factory); (Argentina) Yosi, the Regretful Spy (Amazon MGM Studios)	(Argentina) **División Palermo (K&S Films / Netflix)**; (South Korea) Daily Dose of Sunshine (Film Monster / Netflix); (Australia) Deadloch (Amazon MGM Studios); (France) HPI (Itinéraire Productions / Septembre Productions / TF1 / Pictanovo / Be-Films / RTBF)
Best Performance by an Actor	Best Performance by an Actress
(United Kingdom) **Timothy Spall as Peter Farquhar in The Sixth Commandment (Wild Mercury Productions / True Vision)**; (Brazil) Júlio Andrade as Herbert Jose "Betinho" de Souza in Living on a Razor's Edge (Globoplay / AfroReggae Audiovisual / Formata Produções e Conteúdo); (Turkey) Haluk Bilginer as Agâh Beyoğlu in Şahsiyet (Ay Yapım); (France) Laurent Lafitte as Bernard Tapie in Class Act (Unité / Netflix)	(Thailand) **Chutimon Chuengcharoensukying as Aoy in Hunger (Songsound Productions / Netflix)**; (Mexico) Adriana Barraza as Teacher Georgina in Where the Tracks End (Woo Films / Netflix); (France) Sara Giraudeau as Marion Lafarge in Everything is Fine (Maui Entertainment / Fédération Entertainment); (United Kingdom) Jessica Hynes as Emily Yates in There She Goes (Merman Television)
Best TV Movie/Mini-Series	Best Telenovela
(Germany) **Dear Child (Constantin Film AG / Netflix)**; (Brazil) Anderson Spider Silva (Pródigo Filmes / Paramount+); (Japan) Deaf Voice: A Sign-Language Interpreter in Court (NHK); (United Kingdom) The Sixth Commandment (Wild Mercury Productions / True Vision)	(Spain) **The Vow (Bambú Producciones / RTVE)**; (Colombia) Rigo (Estudios RCN); (Turkey) Safir (ATV / NTC); (Spain) Salón de Té La Moderna (Boomerang TV / RTVE)
Best Arts Programming	Best Documentary
**Pianoforte (Poland) (Telemark)**; (United Kingdom) Robbie Williams (RSA Films / Netflix); (Argentina) Virgilio (House of Chef / Astromax); (Japan) Who I Am Life (WOWOW Inc. / Wood's Office)	(United Kingdom) Otto Baxter: Not a F**ing Horror Story (Story Films / Archface Films / Sky Documentaries); (France) The Billionaire, the Butler and the Boyfriend (Quadbox / Netflix); (Singapore) The Exiles (Mediacorp); (Brazil) Transo (FRM / Canal Futura / LateForCake)
Best Short-Form Series	Best Non-Scripted Entertainment
(Spain) **Point of No Return (TV3 Catalonia)**; (Australia) Kweens of the Queer Underground (Sydney Production Company / ABC / Create NSW); (Chile) Our Lives (BTF Media / CNTV / TVN); (Japan) Say Hello to Kenshiro (DMM.com / So-ket)	(Belgium) **The Restaurant That Makes Mistakes (Roses Are Blue / Red Arrow / VRT)**; (South Africa) The Bridge (Red Pepper Pictures / kykNET); (Mexico) Me caigo de risa (TelevisaUnivision); (Australia) The Summit (Endemol Shine / Nine Network)
Best News	Best Current Affairs
(United Kingdom) **Channel 4 News: "Israel-Hamas at War" (Channel 4 News)**; (Brazil) GloboNews & RJ2: "Secret Payrolls" (Globo); (Bulgaria) Tragediata v lokorsko (Nova); (Qatar) War on Gaza (Al Jazeera English)	(United Kingdom) **Sky News: "The Last Hospital: 30 Days in Myanmar" (Sky News)**; (Brazil) GloboNews Documentary: "Evel, Hazin: Days of Mourning" (TV Globo); The Trap: India's Deadliest Scam (BBC India Eye); (Israel) UVDA with Ilana Dayan: "Brother & Sister in Captivity" (UVDA Ltd. / Keshet Media Group)
Best Sports Documentary	Kids: Animation
(United Kingdom) **Brawn: The Impossible Formula 1 Story (North One Television)**; (Mexico) Tan Cercas de la Nubes (N+Docs / Éramos Tantos / Ruta 66 Cine / Filmadora / ViX); Tour de France (Quadbox / Netflix); (Japan) WHO I AM Paralympic (WOWOW Inc. / Acrobat Film)	(United Kingdom) **Tabby McTat (Magic Light Pictures)**; (Brazil) Wake Up, Carlo! (Copa Studio / Netflix); (France) Mystery Lane (HARI); (Singapore) Sharkdog (Nickelodeon International / One Animation)
Kids: Factual	Kids: Live-Action
(Mexico) **The Secret Life of Your Mind (Warner Bros. Discovery / Pictoline)**; (Netherlands) Living Library (Skyhigh TV); (United Kingdom) My Life: Eva's Having a Ball (Fresh Start Media); (South Africa) The Takalani Sesame Big Feelings Special (Sesame Workshop / Ochre Moving Pictures)	(Denmark) **One of the Boys (Apple Tree Productions)**; (United Kingdom) Dodger (BBC Studios Kids & Family Productions); (Brazil) School of Funk (Paramount+ / Paramount Television International Studios / Kondzilla); Gong! My spectRacular Life (KiKA – Der Kinderkanal von ARD und ZDF / eitelsonnenschein GmbH Germany)

== Multiple nominations ==
Multiple nominations by country
Nominations	Country
11	United Kingdom
7	France
7	Brazil
4	Australia
4	Japan
4	Mexico
3	Argentina
3	Spain
2	India
2	Turkey
2	Singapore
2	Germany
2	South Africa

== Multiple wins ==
Multiple wins by country
Wins	Country
6	United Kingdom
2	Spain
