= FC Zulu =

Danish television program (2004–2006)

- Created by: Palle Strøm; Keld Reinicke
- Starring: Mark Strudal
- Country of origin: Denmark
- No. of episodes: 24

Production
- Running time: 25 Minutes

Original release
- Network: TV 2 Zulu
- Release: September 13, 2004 – October 30, 2006

FC Zulu is a Danish television program on TV 2 Zulu. It tells the story about 16 nerds, who had never touched a football before, trained in 2004 for three months, with the goal of playing against FCK in PARKEN. Against all odds, they were able to score a goal. This year, the incapable nerds return, again led by the coach duo, Mark Strudal and TNT. This time is the opponent is none other than Swedish FC Zulu-copy FC Z who FC Zulu beat 6–0.

In 2005 they were nominated for an Emmy for best 'Non-Scripted-Entertainment', but didn't win. The show has later been launched in several other countries, with FC Nerds as the name instead.

== 2004 Squad ==
- 1. Claus Raasted
- 2. Lars Paludan-Müller
- 3. Christian Gydesen
- 4. Mikkel Erichsen
- 5. Isaack Rasmussen
- 6. Morten R. Jørgensen
- 7. Simon Emil Ammitzbøll
- 8. Thomas Riviére
- 9. Morten Eggers
- 11. Jonas Flensbak
- 12. Michael Ulrik Stobbe
- 13. Martin Nielsen
- 14. Bo Bendtsen
- 15. Jan Faberov
- 17. Claus Hjelm
- 18. Daniel Szylit

== 2005 Squad ==
- 1. Dan Østergaard
- 2. Lars Paludan-Müller
- 4. Mikkel Erichsen
- 5. Isaack Rasmussen
- 6. Kaare Madsen
- 7. Kenny Bro
- 8. Thomas Rivière
- 9. Morten Eggers
- 10. Emil Pedersen
- 11. Claus Raasted
- 12. Michael Ulrik Stobbe
- 13. Martin Nielsen
- 14. Bo Bendtsen
- 15. Jan Farberov
- 17. Claus Hjelm
- 18. Daniel Szylit

== 2006 Squad ==
- 1. Uffe Pedersen (Keeper)
- 2. Lars Paludan-Müller
- 4. Mikkel Erichsen
- 5. Isaack Rasmussen
- 6. Kaare Madsen
- 7. Kenny Bro
- 8. Claus Hjelm
- 9. Morten Eggers
- 10. Daniel Szylit
- 11. Uffe Pedersen
- 12. Michael Ulrik Stobbe
- 13. Martin Nielsen
- 14. Anders Mygind Christensen
- 15. Jan Farberov
- 16. Peter Niebling
- 17. Morten Kongsfelt
- 18. Anders Mygind Christensen (Keeper)

== Episode guide ==
=== Season one ===
==== Episode 1 ====
One ball, 16 cones. - 16 nerds, who had never touched a football, top-train for three months, after the completion of which they will play against FCK, one of the top soccer teams in Denmark, in Parken, the national stadium. In the lead as coach is the former national team player and goal-king Mark Strudal. FC Zulu consists of a pack of logical thinking computer nerds, role players and a single politician. When the players meet their coach Mark Strudal for the first time, they realized that what they had signed up for was no picnic. First challenge: a training match against a teenage girl team from Skovlunde. Result: a shocked Mark Strudal.

==== Episode 2 ====
Strudal is tired of the nerds' intellectual debating society on the pitch. They must learn to act as a team. To that end, he sends them on a teambuilding trip to Lejre. Strudal also has a hidden agenda - he wants to find the team's captain on the trip. Dressed in Viking clothes and small leather moccasins, FC ZULU would, during the course of two days, become a close-knit unit. The solidarity is on trial for real, when one of the players is kidnapped by five hostile riders and hung out over "The Victin Bog".

==== Episode 3 ====
The boys are gradually well started with the training, but they should also learn to sell themselves as a real football team. They should therefore definitely have a battle song à la "Re-Sepp-Ten". With Signe Svendsen as FC Zulu's own "Dodo" go the team in the studio, but there is a surprise for the boys - they should not only use their rusty song voices, but their condition will also be tested, when it come to realize for them, that a real music video (of course) also has both fancy dancing scenes and hot girls.

==== Episode 4 ====
One ball, 16 cones. - 16 nerds, who never had touched a football, should top-train in three months, whereupon they will play against FCK i PARKEN - a scenario, which all the players fears. To learn them to watch the fear in the eyes, sends Mark Strudal his team into Vridsløselille State Prison to play against the prisoners. The prisoners' team consists of murder- and narco- prisoners, so the panic in FC Zulu spreads, when the players see their opponents for the first time. Can referee Kim Milton control the prisoners?

==== Episode 5 ====
The players don't have much wildness, e.g. excuse they still graciously, if they are running into each other on the pitch by accident. A desperate coach Strudal sends the nerds on re-education at the male therapist Carl-Mar Møller. A decision, which makes the intellectual Zulu-nerds so angry, that they in secret plans a surprise, which makes even Carl-Mar gape.

==== Episode 6 ====
Nerds are often superintelligent - but are more interested in computers than the latest trends. It must be different, if the players should charm the female fans in Parken. Strudal sends the players to make-over at Zulu's "Modepatrulje" (Danish: Fashion Patrol), who gives the players a "lovely" treatment. There is a big surprise for the nerds' families, when they later appear with the right Beckham-look on the red runner in Imperial Cinema.

==== Episode 7 ====
So are we there soon - the nerds from FC Zulu should very soon play the big match in Parken against the FCK-lions. Even though Strudal has used all strengths into the training, the players are still a bit doubtful on the pitch. Strudal has therefore asked two earlier, known Brøndby-players to help, to give FC Zulu tips about how to beat FCK. The boys should moreover play faith match against the girl junior team, they met on their very first day as FC Zulu-players. The players are keen to beat the girls and they give all, they got inside.

==== Episode 8 ====
So is it the big day, where the form for real should be tested, and Mark Strudal should find out if all the hard training have borne fruit: Today should FC Zulu meet the FCK-lions in Parken in front of thousands of spectators. The players are being accommodated on a hotel, just like real footballers, and we follow their preparations and anger attacks from early morning to when they are on the pitch in front of the lions. Will their exertions bear fruit? Can FC Zulu beat FCK on their home ground in Parken?

==== FC Zulu vs. FCK All-stars ====
FC Zulu 1-6 FCK All-stars

=== Season two ===
==== Episode 1 ====
In FC Zulu's first season as a football team, they have been permitted to go through things - they never had dreamed about. Now meets Mark Strudal again his FC Zulu team after the winter break. And he is shocked. The nerds are again totally out of shape - and they have additionally got a lot of star crotches, because they now are famous. But Strudal has a cunning plan, as the nerds not had expected.

==== Episode 2 ====
The nerds on the country. How will the old players receive the four new heavyrock-interested players? The team's coach Mark Strudal means, that his team should get together before they for real start a new, hard season. FC Zulu taker therefore so far out on the country, as you almost can come, namely to Gåser in Northern Jutland, where the farmer Mogens Mortensen knows, how you makes the right team spirit: All it needs is just a little bit of horses, pigs, cows and sheep.

==== Episode 3 ====
It is totally wrong with the condition, the dribbles and the ball feeling at the FC Zulu-players. What will happen when the nerds, there badly can dribble, should play in front of filled stands in the decisive match against the Swedish nerd-team? When it is the nation's honour, there are risked, plans Mark Strudal a daring plan: Ball jugglers and circus artist should teach FC Zulu body- and ball control. And where is the press more merciless than in Circus Benneweis' ring?

==== Episode 4 ====
The nerds' discipline to the football training is bad. Very bad. And Mark Strudal is so frustrated over their lax pose, that he sends them on "re-education" in the Life Guards. But none of the nerds likes that-is-just-how-it-is-education - and in short time succeed it the 16 football cones, to get the sergeants on Høvelte barracks go crazy.

==== Episode 5 ====
The rumours say that the Swedish nerds, as FC Zulu should play national game against, is some big guys, there are ready to smash FC Zulu. Mark Strudal let the earlier American football player and coach Claus Elming have his team, who promises, that he will give FC Zulu a hardness, brutality and cynicism, as they never will forget. Later should FC Zulu play match against some terrifying rocks.

==== Episode 6 ====
The important national game against the Swedes is just around the corner. Therefore, Mark Strudal decides that the boys should be toptuned on a training stay in foreign countries. But the nerds is more minded on relaxing and holiday than training. For the first time i the progress loses Mark Strudal courage - and with that is FC Zulu on way to the precipice. Strudal has namely planned, that FC Zulu should play their first international match.

==== Episode 7 ====
Not yet available.

==== Episode 8 ====
Not yet available.

==== FC Zulu vs. FC Z ====
FC Zulu (Denmark) 6-0 FC Z (Sweden)

==== FC Zulu vs. Tufte IL ====
FC Zulu (Denmark) 4-0 Tufte IL (Norway)

==== FC Zulu vs. Paketes FC ====
FC Zulu (Denmark) 2-0 Paketes FC (Spain)
