= FC Z =

Swedish television series

FC Z is a Swedish TV-show about 15 nerds who never have played football (soccer). Now, under management by one of Sweden's best football players through time, Glenn Hysen, FC Z have 4 months to prove to be worthy opponents against Swedish champions Djurgårdens IF. FC Z is a spin-off of the popular Danish reality show and team FC Zulu.

== Trainers ==
- Glenn Hysén (trainer)
- Richard Lidberg (co-trainer)

== Players season 1 ==
- Joachim Almquist (#4)
- Andreas Andersson (#18)
- Kristoffer Andersson (#32)
- Thomas Bodström (#2) (Temporary member against Djurgårdens IF)
- Joakim Dahlin (#15)
- Felix Gottvall (#6)
- Matti Haapamäki (#23)
- Anders Hjelmberg (#3)
- Per-Olof Johansson (#16)
- Tore Kullgren (#21)
- Johan Mickels (#19)
- Farhad Rouhani (#8)
- Daniel Stjernlöf (#1)
- Per Svensson (#20)
- Robin Wiksander (#11)
- Niklas Öjman (#13)

== Players season 2 ==
- Joachim Almquist (#4)
- Andreas Andersson (#18)
- Joakim Dahlin (#15)
- Felix Gottvall (#6)
- Anders Hjelmberg (#3)
- Tore Kullgren (#21)
- Henning Larsson (#14)
- Fredrik Lundebring (#2)
- Keizo Matsubara (#5)
- Johan Mickels (#19)
- Farhad Rouhani (#8)
- Daniel Stjernlöf (#1)
- Joakim "Britney" Söderberg (#10)
- Robin Wiksander (#11)
- Niklas Öjman (#13)

== Trivia ==
- In 2006 FC Z won the Swedish TV award "Kristallen" for best reality TV show.
- The first season was released on DVD on September 20, 2006.
- Joakim Söderberg is nicknamed "Britney" after his idol, American singer Britney Spears.
- In his spare time Tore Kullgren enjoys writing for English Wikipedia.
- Both Keizo Matsubara and Joakim Söderberg played with HC Z, the hockey version of FC Z, before joining the football counterpart for season 2.
