= Tierra Incognita =

Argentinian television series

- Spanish: Tierra Incógnita
- Genre: Mystery; Horror
- Created by: Tomás Wortley
- Composer: Loishka
- Country of origin: Argentina
- Original language: Spanish
- No. of seasons: 2
- No. of episodes: 16

Production
- Producer: Carolina de Michele
- Cinematography: Victoria Panero
- Editors: Alejandro Alem; Rocío Alem
- Running time: 35–43 minutes
- Production company: Non Stop

Original release
- Network: Disney+
- Release: September 8, 2022 – December 12, 2023

Tierra Incognita (Spanish: Tierra Incógnita) is an Argentinian mystery-horror television series for children and adolescents, which is produced by Non Stop for the Walt Disney Company. The eight-episode first season was released globally on Disney+ on September 8, 2022.

== Plot ==
Eight years ago, Eric Dalaras' parents mysteriously disappeared without a trace. The teenager is determined to solve his parents' disappearance and enters a scary world. After their parents disappear, Eric and his sister Uma grow up with their maternal grandparents. Eric decides to leave there to search for answers in the town of Cabo Qwert, where he lived as a child. For there is also the abandoned amusement park Tierra Incógnita, where his parents were last stratified. With the help of his friends, his sister and his aunt, Eric must overcome his fears to solve the riddle that leads to the answer to the question that most concerns him. But the truth lies hidden in a cosmos as dark as it is unexplored.

EPISODE 1 Eric receives a video message; ghost hunters exploring Tierra Incognita amusement park see a ghostly hand create a circle on their frosty windshield. Eric runs away from his grandparents under the guise of a school camping trip, instead he returns to Cape Qwert hoping to solve the mystery of what happened to his parents. Meanwhile, his Aunt in Cape Qwert shows tourists ancient cave drawings by the beach. However, the tourists want to go to the haunted amusement park instead of looking at the cave drawings, entry into the amusement park is forbidden. Eric returning to Cape Qwert, meets up with his childhood friend and they start to explore the amusement park, Tierra Incognita. Eric's friend, Pablo explains to Eric the night of the lights when his parents disappeared. Despite Pablo's warning, Eric rushes to the Labyrinth ride where the ghost hunters explored in their video post. Once inside, Eric sees a statue like version of his mother however Pablo rushes through the exit of the ride to pull Eric from the hallucination. Once outside Pablo explains it is only safe to enter thru the exit of rides and that it was not Eric's mother but the park playing tricks.

== Cast ==
=== Main cast ===
- Pedro Maurizi as Eric Dalaras
- Mora Fisz as Uma Dalaras
- Thomas Lepera as Pablo
- Tomas Kirzner as Axel Rojas
- Lily Zhoue as Liang
- Lautaro Delgado as Daniel Rojas
- Carla Pandolfi as Carmen Lumens
- Silvia Kutika as Aurora Lumens
- Osmar Núñez as Santiago Lumens

=== Recurring cast ===
- Veronica Intile as Julia Lumens
- Ezequiel Rodríguez as Roberto Dalaras
- Joaquin Ochoa as Agustin Schmidt
- Valentina Gonzalez as Sabrina
- Martin Armendariz as Guillermo Larrosa
- Fernando Malfitano as Javier
- Sebastian Sinnott as Federico
- Horacio Marassi as Don Celestino
- Sofia Boggi as Tina Rozen
- Rocio Boggi as Fina Rozen
- Florencia Dyszel as Sofia
- Diego Alcalá as Cristian Maringolo
- Federico Liss as Andres Moya
- Hernan Jimenez as Charly Salvatierra

== Season 1 ==
| No. overall | No. in season | Title | Directed by | Written by | Original release date |
|---|---|---|---|---|---|
| 1 | 1 | "The Labyrinth" "El Laberinto" | Sebastián Pivotto | Guillermo Barrantes, Celeste Lambert & Javier Rozenwasser | September 8, 2022 |
Driven by a hidden message, Eric makes the decision to return to his hometown. He lies to his grandparents and settles in Tierra Incógnita to solve the mystery of his parents' disappearance.
| 2 | 2 | "The Carousel" "La Calesita" | Sebastián Pivotto | Guillermo Barrantes, Celeste Lambert & Javier Rozenwasser | September 8, 2022 |
After a nightmare, Eric wonders what is real and what is not. His grandfather goes looking for him in Cape Qwert, but as soon as he finds him, he loses Uma. Uma runs away and goes to the amusement park where she relives what happened to her parents.
| 3 | 3 | "The Dalaras Mansion" "La mansión Dalaras" | Sebastián Pivotto | Guillermo Barrantes, Celeste Lambert & Javier Rozenwasser | September 8, 2022 |
Cape Qwert faces a new threat. Eric and Uma stay with Carmen in the village. The villagers are wary after what happened to the lights of the park. Nobody knows where Guillermo is.
| 4 | 4 | "The Haunted Ship" "El Barco siniestro" | Sebastián Pivotto | Guillermo Barrantes, Celeste Lambert & Javier Rozenwasser | September 8, 2022 |
Intrigued by a special lamp, Eric and Pablo go to the amusement park to look for pages from Roberto Dalaras' diary. It won't be easy, because the park is guarded by order of Daniel.
| 5 | 5 | "The Secret Code" "El código secreto" | Sebastián Pivotto | Guillermo Barrantes, Celeste Lambert & Javier Rozenwasser | September 8, 2022 |
Eric has to face more than the growing disapproval towards his family. The unexpected truth behind Pablo's secret baffles him. A discovery allows him to read his father's diary, which is written in code.
| 6 | 6 | "The Worm" "El Gusano" | Sebastián Pivotto | Guillermo Barrantes, Celeste Lambert & Javier Rozenwasser | September 8, 2022 |
After discovering the true meaning of the symbols in his father's diary, the message sets Eric on the trail of the missing pieces of text. Due to a dirty trick by Daniel, Eric gets lost while the monster strikes again.
| 7 | 7 | "The Hidden Room" "El cuarto oculto" | Sebastián Pivotto | Guillermo Barrantes, Celeste Lambert & Javier Rozenwasser | September 8, 2022 |
Uma shows Eric something important in the park. They find Guillermo's phone, which contains information about the creature. Carmen distrusts Daniel and the investigation into the disappearance of Roberto and Julia.
| 8 | 8 | "The Horror" "El Espanto" | Sebastián Pivotto | Guillermo Barrantes, Celeste Lambert & Javier Rozenwasser | September 8, 2022 |
Eric and his friends visit the caves and find important information about the reason for the missing persons in the village. A compromising video gets the police of Cape Qwert in trouble.

== Season 2 ==
| No. overall | No. in season | Title | Directed by | Written by | Original release date |
|---|---|---|---|---|---|
| 9 | 1 | "Julia" "Julia" | Sebastián Pivotto | Guillermo Barrantes, Celeste Lambert & Javier Rozenwasser | December 13, 2023 |
After a confrontation with El Espanto, Eric discovers that he has a mark that causes him to have vivid nightmares. Axel proposes a plan to his father that will help him deal with the pressure from the villagers because of the disappearances.
| 10 | 2 | "The eternal nightmare" "La pesadilla eterna" | Sebastián Pivotto | Guillermo Barrantes, Celeste Lambert & Javier Rozenwasser | December 12, 2023 |
Eric becomes obsessed with understanding the place where he saw his mother, and an old photo album brings him closer to the answer. But what he doesn't realise is that the monster stalking Julia is much closer than he expected.
| 11 | 3 | "Darkness" "Oscuridad" | Sebastián Pivotto | Guillermo Barrantes, Celeste Lambert & Javier Rozenwasser | December 12, 2023 |
Despite the warnings of his friends, who tell him that appearing in two places at the same time is a madness with dire consequences, Eric attempts to go bi-locally to free his mother. Eric's grandfather's secret comes to light.
| 12 | 4 | "Voltan, the silver one" "Voltan, the silver" | Sebastián Pivotto | Guillermo Barrantes, Celeste Lambert & Javier Rozenwasser | December 12, 2023 |
Eric manages to release Julia from the nightmare but cannot find her anywhere; Pablo, Liang and Uma get mad at him for betraying the group; Daniel suffers a harsh defeat against the Double C Lodge.
| 13 | 5 | "Another lap" "Otra vuelta más" | Sebastián Pivotto | Guillermo Barrantes, Celeste Lambert & Javier Rozenwasser | December 12, 2023 |
Eric discovers there is someone living inside the Horror; Julia tells him about the origin of the Definitive Fear; to find answers, Eric must return to the mansion in search of the last part of his father's journal.
| 14 | 6 | "The Staff of the Niktu" "The Niktu Staff" | Sebastián Pivotto | Guillermo Barrantes, Celeste Lambert & Javier Rozenwasser | December 12, 2023 |
While looking for a way of releasing his father, Eric begins to feel more powerful, but also more lost than ever; Santiago's return will give him answers regarding the Night of the Lights and the Lodge's role.
| 15 | 7 | "Talu Klatu" "Talu-Klatu" | Sebastián Pivotto | Guillermo Barrantes, Celeste Lambert & Javier Rozenwasser | December 12, 2023 |
After escaping from the lodge, Eric scores a victory, as he now knows how the Niktu managed to defeat the Horror; Axel finally confronts Daniel and seeks to disarm all plans to take over the creature.
| 16 | 8 | "Everyone is the Fright" "Everyone is the Horror" | Sebastián Pivotto | Guillermo Barrantes, Celeste Lambert & Javier Rozenwasser | December 12, 2023 |
Eric, Pablo, Uma and Liang create a weapon to defeat El Espanto once and for all and devise a plan of action. However, one of them will have to sacrifice himself. But Axel is not ready to give up.
