= Hasina: 36 Days in July =

- Official poster
- Genre: Documentary
- Countries of origin: Doha and United Kingdom
- Original language: English
- No. of episodes: 1

Production
- Producer: Zulkarnain Saer Khan
- News editor: Will Thorne
- Production location: Bangladesh
- Running time: 46:59

Original release
- Network: Al Jazeera
- Release: 24 July 2025

Hasina: 36 Days in July is an investigative documentary film that follows incidents of mass killings of unarmed protestors during 2024 anti-government protests targeting civilians. It revealed audio recordings of conversation including Sheikh Hasina and her allies. This film has been nominated for 54th International Emmy Awards in current affairs category.

== Content ==
The Al Jazera I Unit investigation along with Zulkarnain Saer Khan allegedly exposed, using digitally verified audios, that 2024 the then prime minister Sheikh Hasina ordered usage if lethal weapons on protesters. The investigation revealed audio recordings of conversation including Sheikh Hasina and her allies. Documents obtained by Al Jazeera showed the previous government blocked the internet, access to social media. This investigation featured the forensic pathologist who conducted post-mortem of killed student activist Abu Sayed. He implied the previous government forced him to report a head injury was cause of death rather than a gunshot by police. Family members of Abu Sayed were presented, said they were made to meet Sheikh Hasina in her residence following the killing. The film also featured interview with interim government press secretary Shafiqul Alam and ICT chief prosecutor Muhammad Tajul Islam.

== See also ==
- All the Prime Minister's Men
- Inside the Death Squad
- Zulkarnain Saer Khan
