= Kamiel De Bruyne =

Belgian television producer

Kamiel De Bruyne (born in 1992) is a Belgian television producer.

De Bruyne is best known for creating the Emmy Award-winning Belgian TV-show Sorry voor alles ("Sorry about that").

== Trivia ==
- In his spare time, De Bruyne draws on toilet paper on the train.
- In 2019 De Bruyne's book Fake It Till You Make It, a humorous guide to unseen success for unheard-of lazy people, was published by Van Halewyck.
