= Syn (goddess) =

Norse deity

In Norse mythology, Syn (Old Norse: [ˈsyn], "refusal") is a goddess associated with defensive refusal. Syn is attested in the Prose Edda, written in the 13th century by Snorri Sturluson; and in kennings employed in skaldic poetry. Scholars have proposed theories about the implications of the goddess.

== Attestations ==
In chapter 35 of the Prose Edda book Gylfaginning, High provides brief descriptions of 16 ásynjur. High lists Syn eleventh, and details that she "guards the doors of the hall and shuts them against those who are not to enter". High additionally states that Syn is "appointed in defense" at things "in legal matters in which she wishes to refute" and that her name is connected to a saying where "a denial (syn) is made when one says no."

In the Prose Edda book Skáldskaparmál, Syn is included among a list of 27 ásynjur names. Syn also appears in two kennings used in works recorded in Skáldskaparmál: once for "jötunn" ("hearth-stone-Syn") in Þórsdrápa by Eilífr Goðrúnarson, and for "woman" ("Syn [woman] of soft necklace-stand [neck]") in a work attributed to Steinar.

== Theories ==
Rudolf Simek says that Syn ranks among the female goddesses whose names are recorded from the "late heathen period", but that prior to this these goddesses were considered among the collective dísir, and were, in turn, related to the Germanic Matronae.
