= Mark Strudal =

Danish footballer (born 1968)

Personal information
- Full name: Mark Agner Boecking Strudal
- Date of birth: 29 April 1968 (age 58)
- Place of birth: Glostrup, Denmark
- Position: Striker

Team information
- Current team: Jyllinge FC (Manager)

Youth career
- Holbæk
- Bramsnæs
- Roskilde

Senior career*
Years	Team	Apps	(Gls)
1986–1987	Hvidovre	27	(7)
1988	Næstved	26	(14)
1989	Borussia Dortmund	12	(1)
1989–1991	Grasshoppers	51	(21)
1991–1993	Vejle	10	(6)
1992	→ Næstved IF (loan)	15	(8)
1993	→ Copenhagen (loan)	3	(0)
1993	→ BK Frem (loan)	9	(8)
1993–1995	Brøndby	58	(25)
1995–1996	Næstved	23	(7)
1996	Skoda Xanthi	0	(0)
Total		234	(97)

International career
1988–1989	Denmark U21	11	(3)
1988–1995	Denmark	9	(3)

Managerial career
- 2000–20??: Køge BK (youth)
- 2004–2006: FC Zulu
- 2006–2009: Nordsjælland (U19)
- 2009–2015: Nordsjælland (forward coach)
- 2015–2017: Brøndby (assistant)
- 2018: Lyngby
- 2022–: Jyllinge FC
Medal record
Men's football
Representing Denmark
FIFA Confederations Cup
Winner	1995 Saudi Arabia
CONMEBOL–UEFA Cup of Champions
Runner-up	1993 Argentina
- * Club domestic league appearances and goals

Mark Agner Boecking Strudal (born 29 April 1968) is a Danish football coach and former player who played as a striker.

== Playing career ==
Strudal was born in Glostrup. He got his national breakthrough while playing for Næstved IF in the Danish 1st Division championship. He made his debut for the Danish national team in May 1988, and was named 1988 Revelation of the Year as Næstved finished runners-up in the 1st Division. He moved abroad to play professionally for German team Borussia Dortmund in the winter 1988. He played half a season at Dortmund, but had a controversy with manager Horst Köppel. He moved on to play for Grasshopper Club Zürich in Switzerland in the summer 1989, and won three trophies in his two years at the club. When the Grasshoppers squad faced 20% wage cuts, Strudal decided to leave the club in July 1991.

In September 1991, he returned to Denmark to play for Vejle Boldklub in a transfer deal worth more than DKK 4 million. It was later to be known that his contract with Vejle had a clause which secured Vejle approximately DKK 4 million if he ever was to be sold to a club abroad. His stay at Vejle was short, as he suffered injuries and the club was relegated. He underwent a series of loan deals to other Danish teams; first to former club Næstved IF in the fall 1992, then to F.C. Copenhagen in February 1993, and finally to BK Frem in April 1993.

When his Vejle contract ran out in the summer 1993, he moved on to league rivals Brøndby IF on a free transfer in July 1993. Strudal helped Brøndby win the 1994 Danish Cup and he was a part of the Denmark national team which won the 1995 King Fahd Cup. He stayed two years at Brøndby, before he left the club in July 1995. Despite his credentials, the Vejle clause kept him from moving to a foreign club. He joined Næstved IF for a second time, where he suffered a knee injury which kept him out for five months. He tried to move abroad in the summer 1996, but a four-year contract with Greek club Skoda Xanthi was terminated without pay when Strudal was injured in a pre-season game. He underwent recovery, and made a short comeback to football on an amateur basis at Danish a local club in Hagested in August 1997.

== Coaching career ==
Strudal had to end his active career at the end of 1996 due to an injury and then trained as a teacher, where he later taught at the seminary. In September 2000, Strudal was hired as a youth coach at Køge Boldklub.

In the summer 2004, Strudal was appointed manager of Danish club FC Zulu. However, in December 2005 it was confirmed, that Strudal in the summer 2006 would join FC Nordsjælland as a U19 manager. Beside that, Strudal was also a part of the first team staff, where he functioned as a forward coach. In December 2009, he went on full-time as a part of the first team staff, and therefore left the U19-manager position.

In the summer 2015, Strudal was appointed assistant coach of Thomas Frank at Brøndby IF. He left the position in May 2017.

In June 2018, Strudal was appointed manager of Danish 1st Division club Lyngby Boldklub. However, less than five months later, Strudal was fired, after 20 games with 23 points.

In February 2022, Strudal joined Danish amateur club Jyllinge FC as their manager.

== Honours ==
Grasshoppers

- Nationalliga A: 1989–90, 1990–91
- Swiss Cup: 1989–90

Brøndby

- Danish Cup: 1993–94

Denmark

- King Fahd Cup: 1995

Individual

- 1988 Danish 1st Division: Revelation of the Year
