= A Very Ordinary World =

- Des gens bien ordinaires
- Created by: Ovidie Raziel
- Based on: Des gens bien ordinaires, by Ovidie
- Written by: Ovidie Raziel
- Directed by: Ovidie Raziel
- Starring: Jérémy Gillet
- Country of origin: France
- Original language: French
- No. of episodes: 8

Production
- Producer: Marc Berdugo
- Running time: 14 minutes
- Production companies: Magneto Productions; Canal+

Original release
- Network: Canal+
- Release: 6 June 2022

A Very Ordinary World (original title: Des gens bien ordinaires) is a French television series written and directed by Ovidie Raziel. It is an adaptation of the short film of the same name, also written by Ovidie. The series, available on the Canal+ platform and released in 2022, consists of eight episodes, each 14 minutes long. Actor Jérémy Gillet plays the lead role.

== Synopsis ==
The series tells the story of Romain, played by actor Jérémy Gillet, a sociology student, over the course of eight episodes. Trapped in a toxic romantic relationship with a woman who controls his life, the young man seeks a way out through the world of adult film sets.

== Cast ==
- Jérémy Gillet as Buck Love / Romain
- Sophie-Marie Larrouy as Andrée
- Raïka Hazanavicius as Isaure
- Pablo Cobo as Dylan
- Arthur Dupont as Roméo
- Agathe Bonitzer as Linda
- Andréa Bescond as Valéry
- Fadily Camara as Céline
- Romane Bohringer as Dominique
- Mathieu Lescop as Claude
- Anne Benoît as Josette Rigaud
- Sophie-Marie Larrouy as Andrée
- Raïka Hazanavicius as Isaure
- Pablo Cobo as Dylan
