= Andy Harper =

Australian soccer player

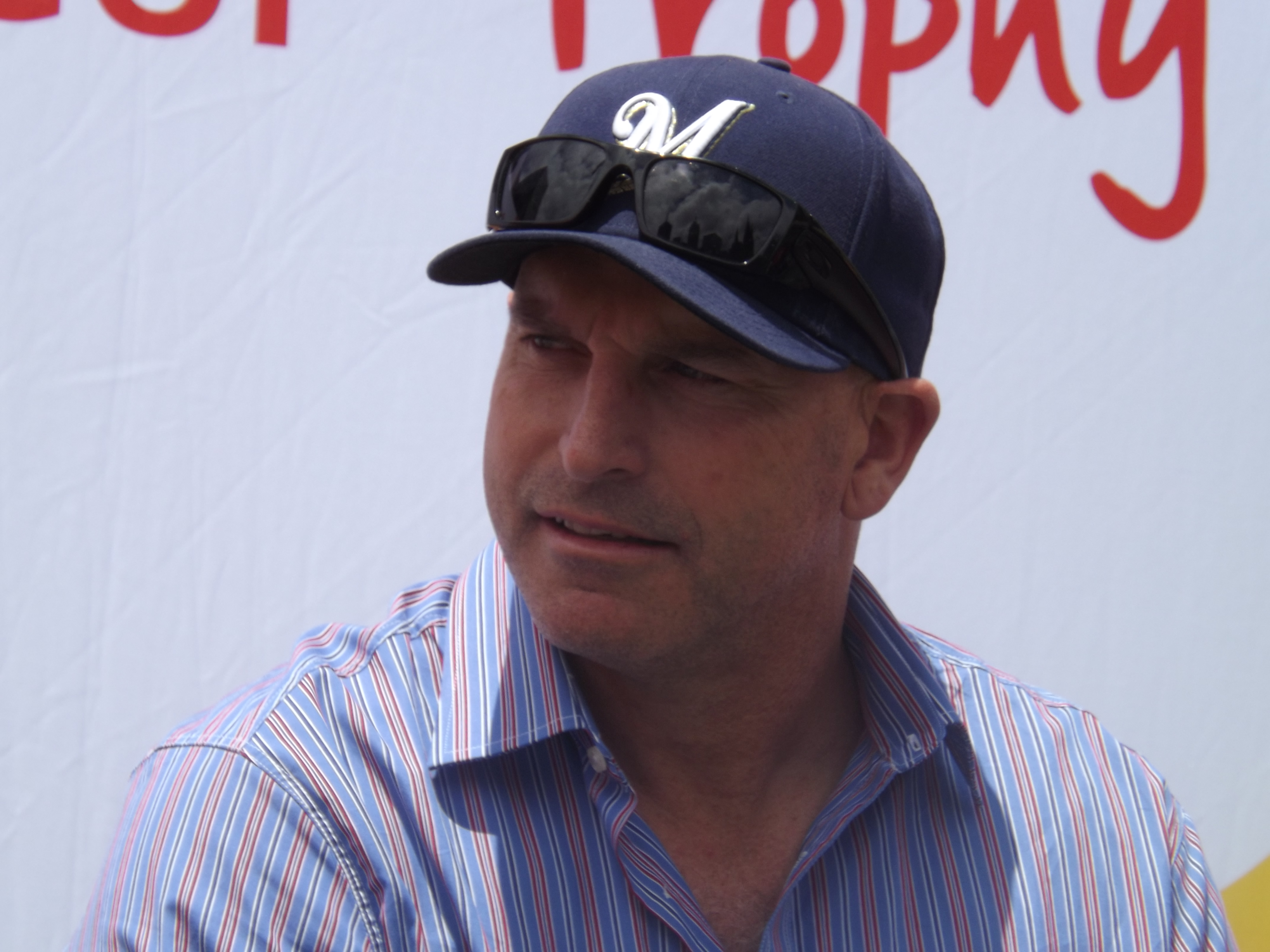
- Harper in 2014

Personal information
- Full name: Andrew Harper
- Date of birth: 13 May 1967 (age 59)
- Place of birth: Sydney, Australia
- Position: Forward

Youth career
- St Ives

Senior career*
Years	Team	Apps	(Gls)
1986	Sydney City	1	(0)
1987	Sydney Olympic	6	(0)
1989–1991	St George	48	(22)
1991–1997	Marconi	155	(65)
1997–1999	Brisbane Strikers	40	(4)
1999–2000	Newcastle Breakers	31	(6)
2000–2001	Newcastle United	17	(3)
Total		321	(100)
- * Club domestic league appearances and goals

Andy Harper (born 13 May 1967) is a former Australian soccer player who played in Australia's National Soccer League (NSL) for Sydney City, Sydney Olympic, St George, Marconi, Brisbane Strikers, Newcastle Breakers and Newcastle United. Harper began a commentary career while still playing, working for Special Broadcasting Service (SBS), Channel 9, C7 Sport, ABC Radio, Fox Sports and Paramount+. He currently covers the A-League for Paramount+ as an expert commentator.

== Playing career ==
Harper began his professional playing career with Sydney City in 1986, their last season in the National Soccer League. Harper spent the 1987 National Soccer League season playing for Sydney Olympic. In January 1989, Harper signed for St George after spending much of 1988 travelling in Europe.

After several years with St George, Harper was sold to Marconi-Fairfield for an $18,000 transfer fee.

In the 1993 NSL grand final, Harper scored from a penalty kick to give Marconi a 1–0 win over Adelaide City.

In 1997, Harper signed a two-year deal with the Brisbane Strikers. He cited a desire to continue commentating for the Special Broadcasting Service (SBS) as a motivation for staying in Australia, despite overseas interest.

Harper joined the Newcastle Breakers at the start of the 1999–2000 NSL season. With the Breakers on the brink of collapse, Harper and a number of other players walked out in September 2000, citing breaches of contract by the club. Harper joined the new Newcastle United along with a number of fellow former Breakers.

Last playing in 2001, Harper made 321 appearances, scoring 100 goals.

== Writing ==
After retiring in 2001 Harper has written three books, the most popular being (Johnny Warren's biography), Sheilas, Wogs and Poofters, The Incomplete Biography of Johnny Warren & Soccer in Australia.

In June 2020 he completed a doctoral thesis titled "Australia’s Power Structures and the Legitimisation of Soccer (2003-2015)" as part of his Doctor of Philosophy study at the University of Sydney.

== TV ==
=== SBS ===
He was a commentator on SBS covering the 1998 FIFA World Cup. He also appeared on SBS in the Grundy Television production Nerds FC in 2006 and 2007.

=== Nine ===
Harper hosted the Nine Network Australia's coverage of the 2002 World Cup.

=== Fox Sports ===
He covered the European Championships in 2000 and 2004 with Fox Sports, On 29 July 2006 he joined the Fox Sports football team as a pundit and commentator for the A-League. Harper also features on the weekly program Kick Off as well as previously hosting Fox Sports FC. He is also a regular contributor as an 'expert' Football commentator in the print and electronic media's coverage of football in Australia. During his commentary of an Adelaide United Asian Champions League game, he coined the phrase 'spawning salmon' after Adelaide United's Travis Dodd flew in the air to head down the ball assisting Fabian Barbiero.

== Sydney FC ==
In December 2004 Harper was appointed CEO of A-League team Sydney FC. He became director of football development in July 2005, with the role of CEO replaced by an executive general manager. Harper resigned after the end of the 2005–06 season.

== Honours ==
=== Club ===
Marconi

- National Soccer League Championship: 1992–93
- National Soccer League Minor Premiership: 1995–96

Club

Wallamba FC

.Football Mid North Coast AAMS Grand Final 2017
