= Al Jazeera Investigations =

News channel

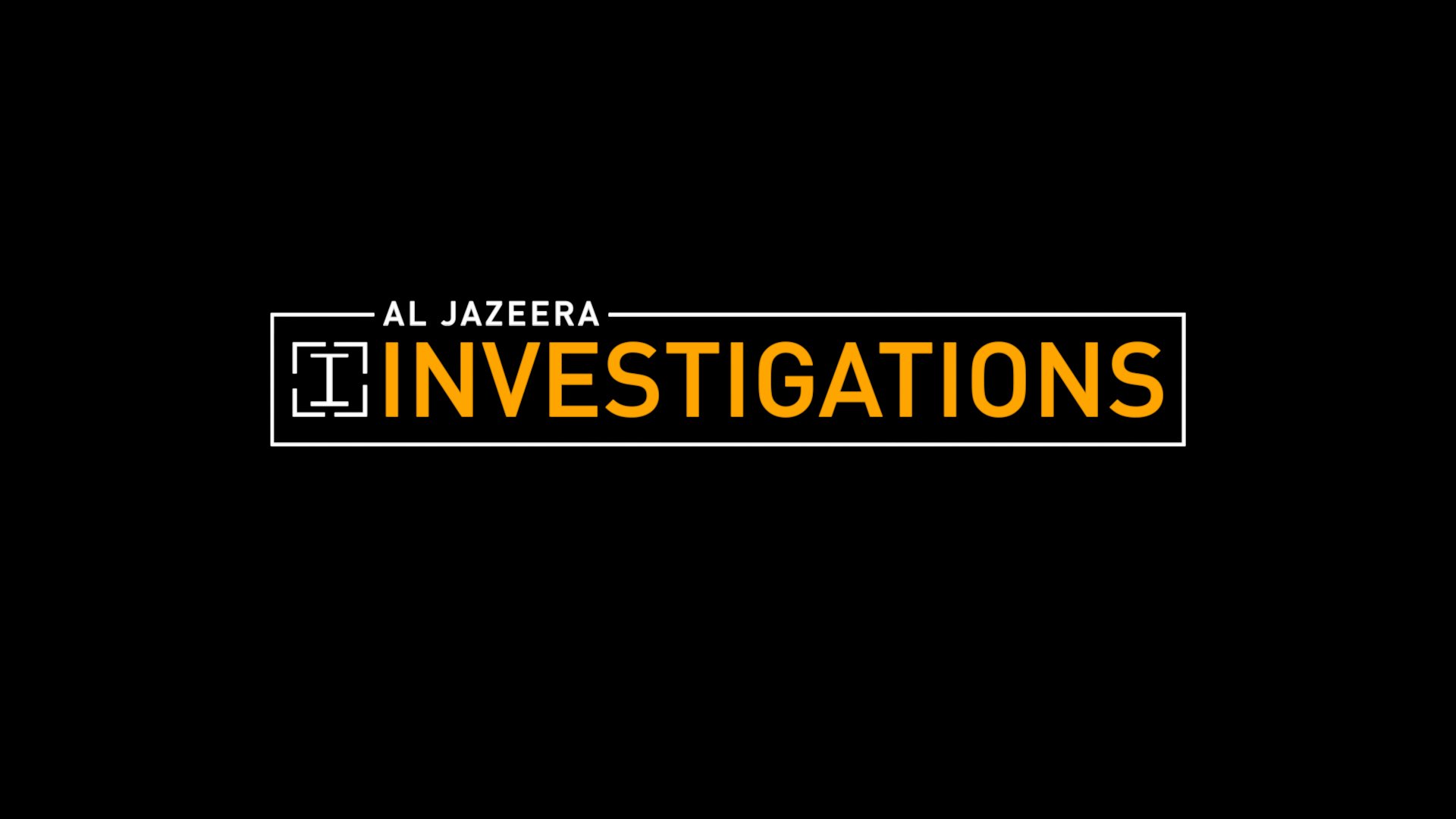
- Also known as: Al Jazeera Investigative Unit
- Genre: Investigative Journalism
- Created by: Al Jazeera Media Network

Production
- Production locations: Doha, Qatar, London, Washington, D.C.

Original release
- Network: Al Jazeera English
- Release: November 2006 – present

Al Jazeera Investigations also known as the Al Jazeera Investigative Unit or the I-Unit is a specialized investigative journalism team within Al Jazeera. The unit is known for producing in-depth investigative reports and documentaries on a wide range of global issues, including politics, human rights and corruption. It produces a podcast called Al Jazeera Investigates.

== The Investigative Unit ==
The Investigative Unit has bureaux in Doha, London and Washington DC. It was formed in 2012 when Al Jazeera decided to create a specialized team whose sole mission was to generate breakthrough content. The I-Unit describes itself as producing "original journalism that disrupts the global news agenda. Its mission is to speak truth to power by exposing wrongdoing while acting in the public interest." Clayton Swisher became the I-Unit's first director following the success of The Palestine Papers and an investigation into the death of Yasser Arafat. I-Unit investigators generate exclusive content for platforms within Al Jazeera Media Network. This material is presented in multiple languages, visual and audio media, ranging in duration from 30 seconds to two hours. The I-Unit's documentaries have won over forty awards and in December 2019, it began its own podcast, series, Al Jazeera Investigates. Notable investigations that made global headlines include Pakistan's Bin Laden Dossier, The Spy Cables, Inside Kenya's Death Squads, The Dark Side, The Lobby, Cricket's Match Fixers, How to Sell a Massacre, and Anatomy of a Bribe. The I-Unit operates under the codes and practices of Britain's Office of Communications, Ofcom, the United Kingdom's government approved broadcast and telecommunications regulator.

== Awards and nominations ==
Award nominations for Al Jazeera Investigates
Year	Nominee / work	Award	Result
2017	Al Jazeera Investigates / Stealing Paradise	One World Media Awards - Corruption Reporting Award	Won
2019	Peter Charley / How to Sell a Massacre	44th Graham Perkin Journalist of the Year Award	Nominated
2020	How to Sell a Massacre	Broadcast Awards - Best News and Current Affairs Programme	Nominated
2019	How to Sell a Massacre	Walkley Awards - All Media Scoop of the Year	Won
2019	How to Sell A Massacre	Foreign Press Association Media Awards - TV Documentary of the Year	Nominated
2019	Cricket's Match Fixers – The Munawar Files	Foreign Press Association Media Awards - Sports Story of the Year	Nominated
Year	Facebook Pages of Hate	Lovie Awards - Gold	Won
2019	How to Sell a Massacre	Association for International Broadcasting Award - International Documentary	Won
2019	Peter Charley	Kennedy Award - Outstanding Investigative Reporting	Won
Year	David Harrison, Lee Sorrell, James Kleinfeld, Phil Rees, Generation Hate	DIG Awards - Long Investigative	Nominated
2019	Cricket’s Match Fixers – The Munawar Files	Headliner Awards	Nominated
2019	Football's Wall of Silence	British Academy Television Award for Best Current Affairs	Nominated
2019	Generation Hate	Rockie Awards - Documentary & Factual: Crime & Investigative Program	Nominated
2019	The Oligarchs, Football's Wall of Silence, Islamophobia Inc	New York Festival TV & Film Awards	Won
2018	Football's Wall of Silence	British Sports Journalism Awards	Nominated
2022	All the Prime Minister's Men	Amnesty International UK Media Awards - Investigation	Won

== See also ==
- All the Prime Minister's Men
- The Lobby (TV series)
- This is Only the Tip of the Iceberg
- HASINA – 36 DAYS IN JULY
