= List of International Emmy Award winners =

This is a list of International Emmy Award winners.

== Current categories ==
=== Arts Programming ===
Year	Arts Programming	Country	Network
2002 (30th)	Dracula: Pages from a Virgin's Diary	Canada	CBC
2003 (31st)	The Life and Times of Count Luchino Visconti	United Kingdom	BBC
2004 (32nd)	George Orwell: A Life in Pictures	United Kingdom	BBC Two
2005 (33rd)	Holocaust: A Music Memorial Film	United Kingdom	BBC/CBC/ZDF/TVP
2006 (34th)	Knowledge Is the Beginning	Germany	ZDF/ARTE
2007 (35th)	Simon Schama's Power of Art: Bernini	United Kingdom	BBC
2008 (36th)	Strictly Bolshoi	United Kingdom	Channel 4
2009 (37th)	The Mona Lisa Curse	United Kingdom	Channel 4
2010 (38th)	The World According to Ion B.	Romania	HBO Romania/Alexander Nanau Production
2011 (39th)	Gareth Malone Goes to Glyndebourne	United Kingdom	BBC Two
2012 (40th)	Songs of War: Music as a Weapon	Germany	ZDF/ARTE
2013 (41st)	Hello?! Orchestra	South Korea	MBC/CEN MEDIA
2013 (41st)	Freddie Mercury: The Great Pretender	United Kingdom	EMP/Mercury Songs/Eagle Rock Entertainment
2014 (42nd)	The Exhibition	Canada	CBC
2015 (43rd)	The Man Who Saved the Louvre	France	France 3
2016 (44th)	The Man Who Shot Hiroshima	Japan	Wowow/Kmax
2017 (45th)	Hip-Hop Evolution	Canada	Banger Films
2018 (46th)	Etgar Keret, gebaseerd op een waar verhaal	Netherlands	Baldr Film/NTR Television
2019 (47th)	Dance or Die	Netherlands	A Witfilm/NTR
2020 (48th)	Vertige de la chute	France	Babel Doc/France Televisions
2021 (49th)	Kubrick by Kubrick	France	Temps Noir/Telemark/ARTE
2022 (50th)	Freddie Mercury – The Final Act	United Kingdom	Rogan Productions
2023 (51st)	Buffy Sainte-Marie: Carry It On	Canada	Eagle Vision/White Pine Pictures
2024 (52nd)	Pianoforte	Poland	Telemark

=== Best Performance by an Actor ===
Year	Actor	Country	Network
2005 (33rd)	Thierry Frémont as Francis Heaulme in Dans la tête du tueur	France	GMT Productions/TF1
2006 (34th)	Ray Winstone as Vincent Gallagher in Vincent	United Kingdom	Granada Drama & Comedy
2007 (35th)	Jim Broadbent as Stan McDermott in The Street	United Kingdom	BBC One
2007 (35th)	Pierre Bokma as Peter van der Laan in De uitverkorene	Netherlands	VPRO Television/IdtV Film BV
2008 (36th)	David Suchet as Robert Maxwell in Maxwell	United Kingdom	BBC
2009 (37th)	Ben Whishaw as Ben Coulter in Criminal Justice	United Kingdom	BBC
2010 (38th)	Bob Hoskins as Paddy Gargan in The Street	United Kingdom	BBC
2011 (39th)	Christopher Eccleston as Willy Houlihan in Accused	United Kingdom	BBC One
2012 (40th)	Darío Grandinetti as Mario in Televisión por la inclusión	Argentina	Canal 9
2013 (41st)	Sean Bean as Simon Gaskell/Tracie Tremarco in Accused	United Kingdom	BBC One
2014 (42nd)	Stephen Dillane as Karl Roebuck in The Tunnel	United Kingdom	Canal+/Sky Atlantic
2015 (43rd)	Maarten Heijmans as Ramses Shaffy in Ramses	Netherlands	AVRO
2016 (44th)	Dustin Hoffman as Mr Henry Hoppy in Roald Dahl's Esio Trot	United Kingdom	Endor Productions/Red Arrow/The Weinstein Company
2017 (45th)	Kenneth Branagh as Kurt Wallander in Wallander	United Kingdom	Left Bank Pictures/Yellow Bird/BBC/TKBC
2018 (46th)	Lars Mikkelsen as Johannes Krogh in Ride Upon the Storm	Denmark	DR/ARTE/SAM le Français
2019 (47th)	Haluk Bilginer as Agâh Beyoglu in Şahsiyet	Turkey	Ay Yapim
2020 (48th)	Billy Barratt as Ray in Responsible Child	United Kingdom	Kudos/72 Films
2021 (49th)	David Tennant as Dennis Nilsen in Des	United Kingdom	New Pictures/ITV
2022 (50th)	Dougray Scott as Ray Lennox in Irvine Welsh’s Crime	United Kingdom	Cineflix/Buccaneer Media
2023 (51st)	Martin Freeman as Chris Carson in The Responder	United Kingdom	Dancing Ledge Productions/BBC
2024 (52nd)	Timothy Spall as Peter Farquhar in The Sixth Commandment	United Kingdom	Wild Mercury Productions / True Vision

=== Best Performance by an Actress ===
Year	Actress	Country	Network
2005 (33rd)	He Lin as Axiu in Slave Mother	China	CCTV-6
2006 (34th)	Maryam Hassouni as Laila al Gatawi in Offers	Netherlands	VARA Broadcasting Organisation
2007 (35th)	Muriel Robin as Marie Besnard in The Poisoner	France	Ramona/RTBF/To Do Today Productions
2008 (36th)	Lucy Cohu as Liz in Forgiven	United Kingdom	Channel 4
2009 (37th)	Julie Walters as Dr Anne Turner in A Short Stay in Switzerland	United Kingdom	BBC
2010 (38th)	Helena Bonham Carter as Enid Blyton in Enid	United Kingdom	BBC Four
2011 (39th)	Julie Walters as Mo Mowlam in Mo	United Kingdom	BBC
2012 (40th)	Cristina Banegas as Paula in Televisión por la inclusión	Argentina	Canal 9
2013 (41st)	Fernanda Montenegro as Dona Picucha in Doce de Mãe	Brazil	Rede Globo
2014 (42nd)	Bianca Krijgsman as Mirte in De Nieuwe Wereld	Netherlands	NPO
2015 (43rd)	Anneke von der Lippe as Helen Sikkeland in Eyewitness	Norway	NRK/DR/SVT/Yle
2016 (44th)	Christiane Paul as Elke Seeberg in Unterm Radar	Germany	Enigma Film/WDR/ARD Degeto
2017 (45th)	Anna Friel as Marcella Backland in Marcella	United Kingdom	Buccaneer Media/Netflix/ITV
2018 (46th)	Anna Schudt as Gaby Köster in Ein Schnupfen hätte auch gereicht	Germany	Zeitsprung Pictures/RTL Television
2019 (47th)	Marina Gera as Irén in Eternal Winter	Hungary	Szupermodern Studio
2020 (48th)	Glenda Jackson as Maud Horsham in Elizabeth Is Missing	United Kingdom	STV Studios
2021 (49th)	Hayley Squires as Jolene Dollar in Adult Material	United Kingdom	Fifty Fathoms
2022 (50th)	Lou de Laâge as Eugénie Cléry in The Mad Women's Ball	France	Légende Films/Prime Video
2023 (51st)	Karla Souza as Mariel Saenz in Dive	Mexico	Madam/Filmadora/Infity Hill/Amazon Studios
2024 (52nd)	Chutimon Chuengcharoensukying as Aoy in Hunger	Thailand	Songsound Productions / Netflix

=== Comedy ===
Year	English title	Original title	Country	Network
2003 (31st)	The Kumars at No 42		United Kingdom	BBC Two
2004 (32nd)	Berlin, Berlin		Germany	Das Erste
2005 (33rd)	The Newsroom		Canada	CBC
2006 (34th)	Little Britain		United Kingdom	BBC One
2007 (35th)	Little Britain Abroad		United Kingdom	BBC One
2008 (36th)	The IT Crowd		United Kingdom	Channel 4
2009 (37th)	Hoshi Shinichi's Short Shorts	Hoshi Shinichi no shôto shôto	Japan	NHK
2010 (38th)	Traffic Light	Ramzor	Israel	Channel 2
2011 (39th)	Benidorm Bastards		Belgium	2BE
2012 (40th)	The Invisible Woman	A Mulher Invisível	Brazil	Rede Globo
2013 (41st)	Moone Boy		United Kingdom	Sky One
2014 (42nd)	What If?	Wat Als?	Belgium	2BE
2015 (43rd)	Sweet Mother	Doce de Mãe	Brazil	Rede Globo
2016 (44th)	Hoff the Record		United Kingdom	Dave
2017 (45th)	Alan Partridge's Scissored Isle		United Kingdom	Sky Atlantic
2018 (46th)	Nevsu		Israel	Channel 2
2019 (47th)	The Last Hangover	Se Beber, Não Ceie	Brazil	Netflix
2020 (48th)	Nobody's Looking	Ninguém Tá Olhando	Brazil	Netflix
2021 (49th)	Call My Agent!	Dix pour cent	France	France 2
2022 (50th)	Sex Education		United Kingdom	Netflix
2023 (51st)	Derry Girls		United Kingdom	Channel 4
2023 (51st)	Vir Das: Landing		India	Netflix
2024 (52nd)	Community Squad	División Palermo	Argentina	Netflix

=== Documentary ===
Year	Documentary	Country
1967	Big Deal at Gothenburg	United Kingdom
1968	La Section Anderson	France
1969	The Last Campaign of Robert Kennedy	Switzerland
1979	Secret Hospital	United Kingdom
1980	Fighting Back	Canada
1981	Charters Pour L'Enfer	France
1982	Is There One Who Understands Me? – The World of James Joyce	Ireland
1983	The Miracle of Life	Sweden
1984	The Heart of the Dragon: Remembering	United Kingdom
1985	28 Up	United Kingdom
1986	Chasing a Rainbow: The Life of Josephine Baker	United Kingdom
1987	The Sword of Islam	United Kingdom
1988	The Last Seven Months of Anne Frank	Netherlands
1989	Four Hours in My Lai	United Kingdom
1990	J'ai Douze Ans et Je Fais la Guerre	France
1991	Cambodia: The Betrayal	United Kingdom
1992	The Fifth Estate: "To Sell A War"	Canada
1993	Disappearing World: We Are All Neighbours	United Kingdom
1993	Monika and Jonas – the Face of the Informer State	Japan
1994	Life in the Freezer: The Big Freeze	United Kingdom
1995	Contre L'Oubli	France
1995	Anne Frank Remembered	United Kingdom
1996	The Pelican of Ramzan the Red	France
1996	People's Century: 1900–1999 episode 1933: The Master Race	United Kingdom
1996	The Saga of Life: The Unknown World	Sweden
1997	Gerrie & Louise	Canada
1998	Exile in Sarajevo	Australia
1999	Just Like Anyone Else	Japan
1999	Born in the USSR – 14 Up	United Kingdom
2000	Kapo	Israel
2001	Welcome to North Korea	Netherlands
2002	Nicholas Winton - The Power of Good	Slovakia
2003	Das Leben geht weiter	Germany
2004	The Boy Whose Skin Fell Off	United Kingdom
2005	The Drama of Dresden	Germany
2006	Hiroshima	United Kingdom
2007	Stephen Fry: The Secret Life of the Manic Depressive	United Kingdom
2008	The Beckoning Silence	United Kingdom
2009	The Ascent of Money	United Kingdom
2010	Mom and the Red Bean Cake	Republic of Korea
2011	Life with Murder	Canada
2012	Terry Pratchett: Choosing to Die	United Kingdom
2013	5 Broken Cameras	France
2014	No Burqas Behind Bars	Sweden
2015	Miners Shot Down	South Africa
2016	Krieg der Lügen	Germany
2017	Exodus: Our Journey to Europe	United Kingdom
2018	Goodbye Aleppo	United Kingdom
2019	Bellingcat: Truth in a Post-Truth World	Netherlands
2020	For Sama	United Kingdom
2021	Hope Frozen: A Quest to Live Twice	Thailand
2022	Enfants de Daech, les damnés de la guerre	France
2023	Mariupol: The People's Story	United Kingdom
2024	Otto Baxter: Not a F**ing Horror Story	United Kingdom

=== Sports Documentary ===
Year	Sports Documentary	Country	Network
2022 (50th)	Queen of Speed	United Kingdom	Sky/Drum Studios
2023 (51st)	Harley & Katya	Australia	Stranger Than Fiction Films
2024 (52nd)	Brawn: The Impossible Formula 1 Story	United Kingdom	North One Television

=== Drama series ===
Year	English title	Original title	Country	Network
2002 (30th)	Unit One	Rejseholdet	Denmark	DR1
2003 (31st)	Nikolaj and Julie	Nikolaj og Julie	Denmark	DR1
2004 (32nd)	Waking the Dead		United Kingdom	BBC One
2005 (33rd)	The Eagle	Ørnen	Denmark	DR1
2006 (34th)	Life on Mars		United Kingdom	BBC One
2007 (35th)	The Street		United Kingdom	BBC One
2008 (36th)	Life on Mars		United Kingdom	BBC One
2009 (37th)	The Protectors	Livvagterne	Denmark	DR1
2010 (38th)	The Street		United Kingdom	BBC One
2011 (39th)	Accused		United Kingdom	BBC One
2012 (40th)	Braquo		France	Canal+
2013 (41st)	The Returned	Les Revenants	France	Canal+
2014 (42nd)	Utopia		United Kingdom	Channel 4
2015 (43rd)	Spiral	Engrenages	France	Canal+
2016 (44th)	Deutschland 83		Germany	RTL
2017 (45th)	Mammon		Norway	NRK1
2018 (46th)	Money Heist	La casa de papel	Spain	Antena 3
2019 (47th)	McMafia		United Kingdom	BBC One
2020 (48th)	Delhi Crime		India	Netflix
2021 (49th)	Tehran		Israel	Kan 11
2022 (50th)	Vigil		United Kingdom	BBC One
2023 (51st)	The Empress	Die Kaiserin	Germany	Netflix
2024 (52nd)	Drops of God	Les Gouttes de Dieu	France	Apple TV+

=== Non-Scripted Entertainment ===
Year	Non-Scripted Entertainment	Country	Network
2003 (31st)	Without Prejudice?	United Kingdom	Channel 4
2004 (32nd)	Brat Camp	United Kingdom	Channel 4
2005 (33rd)	Top Gear	United Kingdom	BBC Two
2006 (34th)	Ramsay's Kitchen Nightmares	United Kingdom	Channel 4
2007 (35th)	How Do You Solve a Problem like Maria?	United Kingdom	BBC
2008 (36th)	The Big Donor Show	Netherlands	Endemol/BNN
2009 (37th)	The Phone	Netherlands	Park Lane TV Productions
2010 (38th)	Caiga Quien Caiga	Argentina	Eyeworks
2011 (39th)	The World's Strictest Parents	United Kingdom	TwentyTwenty Television
2012 (40th)	The Amazing Race Australia	Australia	Seven Network
2013 (41st)	Go Back To Where You Came From	Australia	SBS
2014 (42nd)	Educating Yorkshire	United Kingdom	Channel 4
2015 (43rd)	50 Ways To Kill Your Mammy	United Kingdom	Sky1
2016 (44th)	Allt för Sverige	Sweden	Meter Television/SVT
2017 (45th)	Sorry voor Alles	Belgium	VRT/WBITVP België
2018 (46th)	Hoe Zal Ik Het Zeggen?	Belgium	Shelter
2019 (47th)	The Real Full Monty: Ladies' Night	United Kingdom	Spun Gold TV
2020 (48th)	Old People's Home for 4 Year Olds	Australia	Endemol Shine
2021 (49th)	The Masked Singer	United Kingdom	Bandicoot Scotland/ITV
2022 (50th)	Love on the Spectrum	Australia	Northern Pictures/ABC/Netflix
2023 (51st)	A Ponte: The Bridge Brasil	Brazil	Warner Bros. Discovery/Endemol Shine Brasil
2024 (52nd)	The Restautant That Makes Mistakes	Belgium	Roses Are Blue / Red Arrow / VRT

=== Short-Form Series ===
Year	Short-Form Series	Country	Network
2017 (45th)	Familie Braun	Germany	Polyphon/ZDF
2018 (46th)	Una historia necesaria	Chile	Tridi Films/CNTV/Escuela de Cine de Chile
2019 (47th)	Hack The City	Brazil	Fox Lab Brazil/Yourmama
2020 (48th)	#martyisdead	Czech Republic	Bionaut/MALL.TV/cz.nic
2021 (49th)	INSiDE	New Zealand	Luminous Beast
2022 (50th)	Rūrangi	New Zealand	Autonomouse/The Yellow Affair
2023 (51st)	Des gens bien ordinaires	France	Magneto Prod./Canal+
2024 (52nd)	Point of No Return	Spain	TV3 Catalonia

=== Telenovela ===
Year	English title	Original title	Country	Network
2008 (36th)	The Invasion	Al-Igtiyah	Jordan	LBCI
2009 (37th)	India: A Love Story	Caminho das Índias	Brazil	Rede Globo
2010 (38th)	My Love	Meu Amor	Portugal	TVI
2011 (39th)	Blood Ties	Laços de Sangue	Portugal	SIC
2012 (40th)	The Illusionist	O Astro	Brazil	Rede Globo
2013 (41st)	Side by Side	Lado a Lado	Brazil	Rede Globo
2014 (42nd)	Precious Pearl	Joia Rara	Brazil	Rede Globo
2015 (43rd)	Empire	Império	Brazil	Rede Globo
2016 (44th)	Hidden Truths	Verdades Secretas	Brazil	Rede Globo
2017 (45th)	Endless Love	Kara Sevda	Turkey	Star TV
2018 (46th)	The Payback	Ouro Verde	Portugal	TVI
2019 (47th)	The Queen of Flow	La Reina del Flow	Colombia	Caracol Televisión
2020 (48th)	Orphans of a Nation	Órfãos da Terra	Brazil	Globoplay (Note: Orphans of a Nation was shown simultaneously on Globoplay and Rede Globo, but aired first on Globoplay.)
2021 (49th)	The Song of Glory	Jǐnxiù nán gē	China	Tencent Video
2022 (50th)	The King's Affection	Yeonmo	South Korea	KBS2
2023 (51st)	Family Secrets	Yargı	Turkey	Kanal D
2024 (52nd)	The Vow	La Promesa	Spain	La 1

=== TV Movie / Mini-Series ===
Year	English title	Original title	Country	Network
2002 (30th)	The Manns – Novel of a Century	Die Manns – Ein Jahrhundertroman	Germany	Arte
2003 (31st)	Coming Home	Mein Vater	Germany	WDR
2004 (32nd)	Henry VIII		United Kingdom	ITV
2005 (33rd)	Young Andersen	Unge Andersen	Denmark	DR1
2006 (34th)	Nuit Noire, October 17, 1961	Nuit noire 17 octobre 1961	France	Canal+
2007 (35th)	Death of a President		United Kingdom	More4
2008 (36th)	Televisión por la identidad		Argentina	Telefe
2009 (37th)	The Wolves of Berlin	Die Wölfe	Germany	ZDF
2010 (38th)	Small Island		United Kingdom	BBC One
2011 (39th)	Millennium		Sweden	SVT1
2012 (40th)	Black Mirror: The National Anthem		United Kingdom	Channel 4
2013 (41st)	A Day for a Miracle	Das Wunder von Kärnten	Germany	ZDF
2014 (42nd)	Generation War	Unsere Mütter, unsere Väter	Germany	ZDF
2015 (43rd)	White Soldier	Soldat blanc	France	Canal+
2016 (44th)	Capital		United Kingdom	BBC One
2017 (45th)	Don't Leave Me	Ne m'abandonne pas	France	France 2
2018 (46th)	Man in an Orange Shirt		United Kingdom	BBC One
2019 (47th)	Safe Harbour		Australia	SBS
2020 (48th)	Responsible Child		United Kingdom	BBC Two
2021 (49th)	Atlantic Crossing		Norway	NRK1
2022 (50th)	Help		United Kingdom	Channel 4
2023 (51st)	Dive	La caída	Mexico	Amazon Prime Video
2024 (52nd)	Dear Child	Liebes Kind	Germany	Netflix

== Other categories ==
=== Children & Young People ===
==== Kids: Animation ====
Year	Kids: Animation	Country	Network
2012	The Amazing World of Gumball	United Kingdom; United States	Cartoon Network
2013	Room on the Broom	United Kingdom	BBC
2014	The Jungle Bunch	France	France 3
2015	Ronja, the Robber's Daughter	Japan	NHK/Dwango/Polygon Pictures
2016	Shaun the Sheep: The Farmer's Llamas	United Kingdom	Aardman Animations
2017	Revolting Rhymes	United Kingdom	Magic Light Pictures
2018	Heads Together	Netherlands	Viking Film/VPRO Television/Job, Joris & Marieke
2019	Zog	United Kingdom	Magic Light Pictures
2020	The Tiger Who Came to Tea	United Kingdom	Channel 4
2021	Shaun the Sheep: Adventures from Mossy Bottom	United Kingdom	Aardman Animations
2022	Shaun the Sheep: The Flight Before Christmas	United Kingdom	Aardman Animations
2024	Tabby McTat	United Kingdom	Magic Light Pictures

==== Kids: Factual & Entertainment ====
Year	Kids: Factual	Country	Network
2020	Finding My Family: Holocaust – A Newsround Special	United Kingdom	CBBC
2021	Scars of Life	Belgium	De Mensen
2022	My Better World	South Africa	Fundi Films/Maan Creative/Impact(Ed)
2024	The Secret Life of Your Mind	Mexico	Warner Bros. Discovery / Pictoline

==== Kids: Live-Action ====
Year	Kids: Series	Country	Network
2020	Hardball	Australia	Northern Pictures
2021	First Day	Australia	Epic Films/ACTF
2022	Kabam!	Netherlands	NPO/IJswater Films/KRO-NCRV
2024	One of the Boys	Denmark	Apple Tree Productions

=== Journalism ===
==== News ====
Year	Current Affairs	Country	Network
1999	Dispatches: A Witness to Murder	United Kingdom	Channel 4
2000	The Mozambique Floods	United Kingdom	ITV News
2002	Fall of Kabul	United Kingdom	BBC
2003	The Fall of Saddam	United Kingdom	Channel 4
2004	The Madrid Bombing	United Kingdom	Channel 4
2005	Beslan	United Kingdom	Associated Press Television News
2005	Return to Beslan	Netherlands	NCRV Broadcasting Organisation
2006	London Bombings July 7, 2005	United Kingdom	Sky News
2006	Hunting for Taliban	Netherlands	NOVA / NPS / VARA Television
2007	Lebanon Crisis	United Kingdom	BBC News
2008	Any Idea of What Your Kid is Doing Right Now?	Romania	Pro TV News
2009	China Earthquake	United Kingdom	ITV News
2010	Pakistan – Terrors' Front Line	United Kingdom	Sky News
2011	War on Drugs	Brazil	Rede Globo
2012	Great East Japan Earthquake Emergency News	Japan	NHK
2013	The Battle for Homs	United Kingdom	Channel 4
2014	Syria's Descent	United Kingdom	Channel 4
2015	The Ebola Effect	Canada	Canadian Broadcasting Corporation
2016	Migration Crisis	United Kingdom	Sky News
2017	Inside Aleppo – Battle for Aleppo	United Kingdom	Channel 4 News
2018	Rohingya crisis	United Kingdom	Sky News
2019	Data, Democracy and Dirty Tricks: The Cambridge Analytica Scandal	United Kingdom	ITN / Channel 4 News
2020	Hong Kong – A Year of Living Dangerously	United Kingdom	ITN
2021	A Warning from Italy	United Kingdom	Sky News
2022	ITV News: Storming of The Capitol	United Kingdom	ITN Productions / ITV News

==== Current Affairs ====
Year	News	Country	Network
2007	Baghdad: A Doctor's Story	United Kingdom	BBC
2008	Peter R. de Vries – Natalee Holloway	Netherlands	Peter R. de Vries
2009	Dispatches – Saving Africa's Witch Children	United Kingdom	Channel 4
2010	Dispatches – Pakistan's Taliban Generation	United Kingdom	Channel 4
2011	Back from the Brink: Inside the Chilean Mine Disaster	Japan	NHK
2012	Haiti's Orphans: One Year After the Earthquake	Canada	CBC
2013	Banaz: An Honour Killing	United Kingdom	Fuuse Films
2014	The Fifth Estate: "Made in Bangladesh"	Canada	CBC
2015	Dispatches: Children on the Frontline – Children of Aleppo	United Kingdom	ITV
2016	Dispatches: Escape from ISIS	United Kingdom	ITN Productions
2017	Saudi Arabia Uncovered	United Kingdom	ITV
2018	White Right: Meeting The Enemy	United Kingdom	ITV
2019	Mission Investigate: Deceptive Diplomacy	Sweden	SVT/Mission Investigate
2020	Undercover: Inside China's Digital Gulag	United Kingdom	Hardcash Productions/ITV
2021	In Cold Blood (Exposure)	United Kingdom	ITV
2022	Slahi und seine Folterer (In Search of Monsters)	Germany	Hoferichter & Jacobs/NDR/RBB/MDR/Arte

== Honorary Awards ==
=== Founders Awards ===
Year	Winner	Country	Note
1980	Jim Henson	United States	Creator of the Muppets
1981	Shaun Sutton	United Kingdom	Head of BBC-TV's Drama Group
1981	Roone Arledge	United States	Executive Producer, ABC's Wide World of Sports
1982	Michael Landon	United States	Executive Producer/Director/Writer/Performer
1983	Herbert Brodkin	United States	Producer/Partner, Titus Productions
1984	David L. Wolper	United States	Producer/Television Executive
1985	David Attenborough	United Kingdom	Creator/Writer/Producer/TV Host
1986	Donald L. Taffner	United Kingdom	President, D.L. Taffner Ltd
1987	Jacques-Yves Cousteau	France	President, Cousteau Society
1988	Goar Mestre	Argentina	Latin American Broadcasting Pioneer
1989	Paul Fox	United Kingdom	Managing Director, BBC Television
1990	Joan Ganz Cooney	United States	American television producer
1991	Adrian Cowell	United Kingdom	Film Maker, ITV Central
1992	Bill Cosby	United States	Comedian/Actor/Producer
1993	Richard Dunn	United States	CEO, Thames Television
1994	Film on Four: Channel 4	United Kingdom	British public-service television broadcaster
1995	Don Hewitt	United States	Executive Producer, CBS' 60 Minutes
1996	Reg Grundy	Australia	Founder, Grundy Productions
1997	Jac Venza	United States	Director of Cultural & Arts Programs, WNET
1998	Robert Halmi Sr.	Hungary	Chairman, RHI Entertainment
1999	Hisashi Hieda	Japan	President, Fuji Television
2000	John Hendricks	United States	Founder & CEO, Discovery Communications
2001	Pierre Lescure	France	Chairman and Chief Executive Officer of Canal+ Group
2002	Howard Stringer	United Kingdom	Chairman & CEO, Sony Corporation of America
2003	HBO	United States	American premium cable and satellite television network
2004	MTV International	United States	Channel subsidiary of MTV Networks
2005	Oprah Winfrey	United States	Chairman, Harpo Inc.
2006	Steven Spielberg	United States	American film director
2007	Al Gore	United States	Chairman, Current TV
2008	Dick Wolf	United States	Creator & Executive Producer, Law & Order
2009	David Frost	United Kingdom	Journalist/Producer
2010	Simon Cowell	United Kingdom	Founder, SYCO
2011	Nigel Lythgoe	United Kingdom	Executive Producer, So You Think You Can Dance; American Idol
2012	Ryan Murphy	United States	Showrunner
2012	Norman Lear	United States	40th Anniversary Special Founders Award
2012	Alan Alda	United States	40th Anniversary Special Founders Award
2013	J. J. Abrams	United States	Film director
2014	Matthew Weiner	United States	Screenwriter, Creator of the series Mad Men
2015	Julian Fellowes	United Kingdom	Screenwriter, Creator of the series Downton Abbey
2016	Shonda Rhimes	United States	Television producer, screenwriter, and author
2017	None	None	None
2018	Greg Berlanti	United States	American film and television writer and producer
2019	David Benioff and D. B. Weiss	United States	Game of Thrones showrunners
2020	Andrew Cuomo (rescinded)	United States	56th Governor of New York
2021	None	None	None
2022	Ava DuVernay	United States	American filmmaker, television producer
2023	Jesse Armstrong	United Kingdom	Screenwriter and producer
2024	David E. Kelley	United States	American television writer, producer

=== Directorate Award ===
Year	Winner	Country	Note
1973	Charles Curran	United Kingdom	President, European Broadcasting Union, Director General, BBC
1974	Dr. Joseph Charyk	United States	President, COMSAT
1975	Junzo Imamichi	Japan	Chairman of the Board, Tokyo Broadcasting System
1976	Talbot S. Duckmanton	Australia	President, Asian Broadcasting Union, CBE (Citation)
1976	Roberto Marinho	Brazil	President, TV Globo Network of Brazil (Citation)
1976	Howard Thomas	United Kingdom	Chairman of the Board, Thames Television, (Citation)
1977	Alphonse Ouimet	Canada	Chairman, Telesat, Canadian TV
1979	Frank Stanton	United States	President Emeritus, CBS, Incorporated 1978 Prix Italia
1980	Lew Grade	United Kingdom	Chairman of the Board, Associated Communications Corp.
1981	Sir Huw Wheldon	United Kingdom	Retired (1976) Managing Director of BBC-TV
1982	Akio Morita	Japan	Chairman and CEO, Sony Corporation
1983	Roberto Marinho	Brazil	President, TV Globo Network of Brazil
1984	Sydney Bernstein	United Kingdom	Founder, Granada Television
1985	Leonard H. Goldenson	United States	Chairman and CEO, ABC
1986	Herbert Schmertz	United States	Vice President, Public Affairs, Mobil Oil Company
1987	Jeremy Isaacs	United Kingdom	Chief Executive, Channel 4
1988	Vittorio Boni	Italy	Director, International Relations, RAI (Posthumously)
1989	Ted Turner	United States	Chairman of the Board/President, Turner Broadcasting System (Citation)
1989	Murray Chercover	Canada	Chairman and CEO, CTV Television Network
1990	Henrikas Juškevičius	Lithuania	Assistant Director-General, UNESCO
1991	Henry Becton	United States	President, WGBH, Boston
1992	Silvio Berlusconi	Italy	President, Fininvest Gruppo
1993	André Rousselet	France	Chairman, Canal Plus
1994	Helmut Thoma	Germany	Managing Director, RTL
1995	John Birt	United Kingdom	Director General, BBC
1996	Herbert A. Granath	United States	Chairman, ABC/Disney Cable International
1997	Dieter Stolte	Germany	Intendant, ZDF
1998	Sam Nilsson	Sweden	President, Sveriges Television
1999	Ralph Baruch	United States	Founder, Viacom
2000	Su-Ming Cheng	China	CEO China-TV, Taiwan
2001	Gustavo Cisneros	Venezuela	Chairman, Organizacion Cisneros
2002	Katsuji Ebisawa	Japan	President, NHK
2003	Greg Dyke	United Kingdom	Director General, BBC
2004	Herbert Kloiber	Germany	Managing Director, Tele-München Group
2005	Charles Allen	United Kingdom	Chief Executive, ITV
2006	Ronald S. Lauder	United States	Founder and Chairman, Central European Media Enterprises (CME)
2007	Patrick Le Lay	France	Chairman, TF1 Group
2008	Liu Changle	Hong Kong	Chairman & CEO, Phoenix Satellite Television
2009	Markus Schächter	Germany	Director General, ZDF
2010	Lorne Michaels	United States	Creator & Executive Producer, Saturday Night Live
2011	Subhash Chandra	India	Chairman, Zee TV
2012	Kim In-Kyu	South Korea	President & CEO, Korean Broadcasting System
2013	Anke Schäferkordt	Germany	CEO Mediengruppe RTL Deutschland & CO-CEO RTL Group
2014	Roberto Irineu Marinho	Brazil	Chairman & CEO of Grupo Globo
2015	Richard Plepler	United States	Chairman & CEO, HBO
2016	Maria Rørbye Rønn	Denmark	CEO & Director General, DR
2017	Emilio Azcárraga Jean	Mexico	Chairman & CEO, Grupo Televisa
2018	Sophie Turner Laing	United Kingdom	Chief executive officer of Endemol Shine Group
2019	Christiane Amanpour	United States	Chief international anchor for CNN
2020	None	None	None
2021	Thomas Bellut	Germany	Director General of German national broadcaster ZDF
2022	Miky Lee	United States	Vice president of CJ Group
2023	Ekta Kapoor	India	Managing director of Balaji Telefilms
2024	Sidonie Dumas	France	CEO of Gaumont
2025	João Roberto Marinho	Brazil	CEO of Grupo Globo

== Others ==
=== International Children's Day of Broadcasting Award ===
Presented by UNICEF in conjunction with International Emmy Awards and awarded to a broadcaster whose children's programming on or around the first Sunday in March of the previous year best reflects the theme declared by UNICEF for that year. Aims and conditions may be found at .

- 2010 – Télévision Togolaise of Togo for its weekly A Nous La Planete
- 2009 – Citizen TV of Kenya for its weekly Angels Café
- 2008 – China Central Television children's channel for documentary On the Way
- 2007 – National Broadcasting of Thailand for From South to North, From East to West, Thailand ICDB – Unite for Children, Unite Against AIDS
- 2006 – Teleradio Moldova for their program Let's Play!
- 2005 – Egyptian TV for Rebellion of the Canes
- 2004 – ATN Bangla for Amrao pari (We, too, Can)
- 2003 – Television 13 of Colombia, with the support of Fundación Imaginario for Tropas de Paz (Peace Troops), Disparando Cámaras para la Paz (Cameras Shooting for Peace) and A Prender TV (To Learn TV) Directed by Mariana Ferrer and Alejandro Jaramillo
- 2002 – Star News of New Delhi, India
- 2001 – Consorcio Cigala by Canal Capital of Colombia. Directed by Diego León Hoyos Jaramillo. Assistant Director Mariana Ferrer and Alejandro Jaramillo
- 2001 – ACE Communications of Kenya for contributions to the UNICEF Say Yes for Children Campaign in 2001
- 2000 – TV Cultura of Brazil
- 1999 – TV Cultura of Brazil
- 1998 – TV Cultura of Brazil
- 1997 – Namibian Broadcasting Corporation
- 1996 – TVOntario, Canada
- 1995 – Sabado Chiquito De Corporan of the Dominican Republic

== Categories extinct ==
=== Dramaturgy ===
==== Best European Artist ====
Year	Winner	Country
1973	Annie Cordy for Hello, Dolly!	Belgium

==== Arts documentary ====
Year	Arts documentary	Country	Network
1991	Damned in the USA	United Kingdom	Channel 4
1992	Jose Carreras: A Life Story	United Kingdom	Iambic Prods. / Primetime Television
1993	The Wonderful, Horrible Life of Leni Riefenstahl	Germany	Omega Film / Nomad Film
1995	Kenzaburo Oe's Long Road to Fatherhood	Japan	NHK
1996	The House	United Kingdom	BBC
1997	Dancing For Dollars: The Bolshoi In Vegas	United Kingdom	NVC Arts
1998	The War Symphonies: Shostakovich Against Stalin	Germany	ZDF
1999	The Phil: Part 3	United Kingdom	Channel 4
1999	Let It Come Down: The Life of Paul Bowles	Canada	CBC
2000	The Jazzman from the Gulag	France	France 3 / Ideale Audience
2001	The Miles Davis Story	United Kingdom	Channel 4

==== Drama series ====
Year	Drama series	Country	Network
1979	On Giant's Shoulders	United Kingdom	BBC
1980	A Rod of Iron	United Kingdom	BBC
1981	A Town Like Alice	Australia	Seven Network
1982	A Voyage Round My Father	United Kingdom	BBC
1983	King Lear	United Kingdom	BBC
1984	The Jewel in the Crown	United Kingdom	ITV
1985	Das Boot	Germany	Wolfgang Petersen
1986	Shadowlands	United Kingdom	BBC Wales
1987	Porterhouse Blue	United Kingdom	Channel 4
1988	A Very British Coup	United Kingdom	Channel 4
1989	Traffik	United Kingdom	Channel 4
1990	First and Last	United Kingdom	BBC
1991	The Black Velvet Gown	United Kingdom	ITV
1992	A Dangerous Man: Lawrence After Arabia	United Kingdom	BBC
1993	Unnatural Pursuits	United Kingdom	BBC
1994	The Bullion Boys	United Kingdom	BBC
1995	The Politician's Wife	United Kingdom	Channel 4
1996	La Colline aux Mille Enfants	France	France 2
1997	Crossing the Floor	United Kingdom	BBC Two
1998	The Tattooed Widow	Sweden	Danmarks Radio
1999	Lost for Words	United Kingdom	ITV
2000	All Stars	Netherlands	VARA
2001	Dirty Tricks	United Kingdom	ITV London

==== Non-English Language U.S. Primetime Programs ====
Year	Non-English Language U.S. Primetime Programs	Country	Network
2014	El Señor de los Cielos	United States	Telemundo
2015	Arrepentidos: El Infierno de Montoya	United States	National Geographic/Fox Telecolombia
2016	Francisco, El Jesuita	United States	Telemundo
2017	Sr. Ávila	United States	HBO Latin America/Lemon Films
2018	El Vato	United States	Universo/Endemol Shine
2019	Falco	United States	Spiral International/Red Arrow/Dynamo
2020	2019 Latin Grammy Awards	United States	Univision/The Latin Recording Academy
2020	La Reina del Sur	United States	Telemundo/Netflix
2021	2020 Latin Grammy Awards	United States	Univision/The Latin Recording Academy
2022	Buscando a Frida	United States	Telemundo/Argos

==== Performing Arts ====
Year	Performing Arts	Country	Network
1979	Elegies for the Death of Three Spanish Poets	United Kingdom	Allegro Films
1980	L'Oiseau de Feu	Canada	CBC
1981	Sweeney Todd: Scenes from the Making of a Musical	United Kingdom	London Weekend Television
1982	Morte e Vida Severina	Brazil	Rede Globo
1983	Dangerous Music	United Kingdom	HTV
1984	The Tragedy of Carmen	United Kingdom	Channel 4
1985	Omnibus: The Treble	United Kingdom	BBC
1986	Bejart's Kabuki Ballet	Japan	NHK
1988	The South Bank Show	United Kingdom	ITV
1990	The Mahabharata	United Kingdom	Peter Brook
1991	Le Dortoir	Canada	Rhombus Media
1992	Pictures On The Edge	United Kingdom	Canadian Broadcasting Corporation
1993	Concerto	United Kingdom	Initial Film and TV
1994	Peter and the Wolf	United Kingdom	BBC
1995	The Planets	Canada	Rhombus Media
1997	Enter Achilles	United Kingdom	BBC
1998	The Judas Tree	United Kingdom	Channel 4
1999	Rodgers and Hammerstein's Oklahoma!	United Kingdom	Sky Premier / Channel 4
2000	Gloriana, a film	United Kingdom	BBC
2001	Jesus Christ Superstar	United Kingdom	Slovenia TV

==== Popular Arts ====
Year	Popular Arts	Country	Network
1968	Armchair Theatre	United Kingdom	ITV
1973	La cabina	Spain	Televisión Española
1975	The Evacuees	United Kingdom	BBC
1977	Henry Ford's America	Canada	Canadian Broadcasting Corporation
1979	Rich Little's Christmas Carol	Canada	Canadian Broadcasting Corporation
1980	Not the Nine O'Clock News	United Kingdom	BBC
1981	Vinicius para Crianças - Arca de Noé	Brazil	Rede Globo
1983	The Black Adder	United Kingdom	BBC One
1984	Fresh Fields	United Kingdom	ITV
1985	Spitting Image	United Kingdom	ITV
1986	Spitting Image	United Kingdom	ITV
1988	The New Statesman	United Kingdom	ITV
1989	Alexei Sayle's Stuff	United Kingdom	BBC Two
1990	Mr. Bean	United Kingdom	ITV
1991	The Curse of Mr. Bean	United Kingdom	Thames TV
1992	Drop the Dead Donkey	United Kingdom	Channel 4
1993	Drop the Dead Donkey	United Kingdom	Channel 4
1994	Red Dwarf	United Kingdom	BBC
1994	Absolutely Fabulous	United Kingdom	BBC
1995	Don't Forget Your Toothbrush	United Kingdom	Channel 4
1996	Wallace and Gromit	United Kingdom	BBC
1997	Liberg zappt	Netherlands	Ivo Niehe Productions
1998	The Vicar of Dibley: Love and Marriage	United Kingdom	BBC
1999	Smack the Pony	United Kingdom	Channel 4
2000	Smack the Pony	United Kingdom	Channel 4
2001	So Graham Norton	United Kingdom	BBC

==== Children & Young People ====
Year	Children & Young People	Country	Network
1983	Fraggle Rock	Canada	Canadian Broadcasting Corporation
1984	The Wind in the Willows	United Kingdom	Thames TV
1985	Super Gran	United Kingdom	ITV Tyne Tees
1986	The Kids of Degrassi Street	Canada	Canadian Broadcasting Corporation
1987	Degrassi High	Canada	Canadian Broadcasting Corporation
1988	Captain Johnno	Australia	Australian Children's TV Foundation
1989	My Secret Identity	Canada	CTV Television Network
1990	Living With Dinosaurs	United Kingdom	Channel 4
1991	The Fool of the World and the Flying Ship	United Kingdom	Cosgrove Hall Productions/Thames Television
1992	Beat That: Hairdressing	United Kingdom	Channel 4
1992	Sorrow: The Nazi Legacy	Sweden	Filmpoint Stockholm
1993	The Penknife	Netherlands	AVRO/BOS BROS Film/TV Production
1994	Insektors	France	Canal+/France 3
1995	Wise Up	United Kingdom	BBC
1996	Newsround Extra: War Child	United Kingdom	BBC
1997	Wise Up	United Kingdom	Channel 4
1998	Blabbermouth & Stickybeak	United Kingdom	Channel 4
1999	Tell Us About Your Life – Battlefield Doctor	Japan	NHK
2000	The Magician's House	United Kingdom	BBC Wales
2001	Street Cents	Canada	Canadian Broadcasting Corporation
2002	Stig of the Dump	United Kingdom	BBC One
2003	Legend of the Lost Tribe	United Kingdom	BBC Bristol
2004	The Illustrated Mum	United Kingdom	Channel 4
2005	Dark Oracle	Canada	Shaftesbury Films
2006	Sugar Rush	United Kingdom	Channel 4
2007	The Magic Tree	Poland	TVP SA
2008	Shaun the Sheep	United Kingdom	BBC
2009	Dustbin Baby	United Kingdom	Kindle Entertainment
2010	Shaun the Sheep	United Kingdom	BBC
2011	¿Con qué sueñas?	Chile	Televisión Nacional de Chile

==== Kids: Series ====
Year	Kids: Series	Country	Network
2012	Junior High School Diaries	Japan	NHK
2013	Pedro & Bianca	Brazil	TV Cultura
2014	Polseres vermelles	Spain	TV3
2015	Nowhere Boys	Australia	Matchbox Pictures/ABC3
2016	Kasper en de Kerstengelen	Netherlands	NL Film & TV/Avrotros
2017	Club der Roten Baender	Germany	Bantry Bay Productions/VOX Television GmbH
2018	Malhação: Viva a Diferença	Brazil	Rede Globo
2019	De Regels van Floor	Netherlands	NL Film / VPRO Television
2020	Hardball	Australia	ABC Me

==== Kids: Preschool ====
Year	Kids: Preschool	Country	Network
2012	El jardín de Clarilú	Argentina	Disney Latin America
2013	Ben and Holly's Little Kingdom	United Kingdom	Nickelodeon
2014	Mike the Knight	United Kingdom	Treehouse TV/CBeebies
2015	Bing	United Kingdom	CBeebies/Acamar Films Production/Brown Bag Films
2016	Hey Duggee	United Kingdom	Studio AKA
2017	La Cabane à Histoires	France	Dandelooo/Caribara Production
2018	Hey Duggee	United Kingdom	Studio AKA
2019	Bluey	Australia	Ludo Studio

==== Kids: Digital ====
Year	Kids: Digital	Country	Network
2016	Doodles	Australia	Ludo Studio/ABC3 Australia/Screen Australia/Screen Queensland
2017	Jenter	Norway	NRK
2018	Overgrep	Norway	NRK Bivrost
2019	Lik Meg	Norway	NRK Super

==== Kids: TV Movie / Mini-Series ====
Year	Kids: TV Movie / Mini-Series	Country	Network
2012	Lost Christmas	United Kingdom	BBC One
2013	The Phantoms	Canada	CBC Television
2014	Alles mag	Netherlands	VPRO
2015	Rabarber	Netherlands	NL Film & TV/KRO-NCRV
2016	Peter and Wendy	United Kingdom	Headline Pictures/Juliette Films
2017	Hank Zipzer's Christmas Catastrophe	United Kingdom	Kindle Entertainment/DHX Media/Walker Productions/Screen Yorkshire's Content Fund
2018	Ratburger	United Kingdom	King Bert Productions
2019	Jacqueline Wilson's Katy	United Kingdom	BBC Children's In-House Productions/CBBC

==== Kids: Non-Scripted Entertainment ====
Year	Kids: TV Movie/Mini-Series	Country	Network
2012	Energy Survival	Norway	Fabelaktiv/NRK
2013	Pet School	United Kingdom	CBBC
2014	Wild Kids	Sweden	Jarowskij Enterprises/Sveriges Television
2015	All-Round Champion	Norway	NRK
2016	Ultras Sorte Kageshow	Denmark	Danish Broadcasting Corporation
2017	Snapshots	Canada	CBC
2018	Fixa Bröllopet	Sweden	Fremantlemedia Sverige AB
2019	Nachtraven	Belgium	De Mensen/Ketnet/VRT

==== Kids: Factual ====
Year	Kids: Factual	Country	Network
2012	Newsround: My Autism and Me	United Kingdom	BBC
2013	Same but Different	United Kingdom	BBC
2014	¿Con qué sueñas?	Chile	TVN
2015	My Life: I Am Leo	United Kingdom	Nine Lives Media/BBC
2016	Horrible Histories	United Kingdom	Lion Television
2017	Berlin und wir	Germany	Imago TV/ZDF
2018	My Life: Born to Vlog	United Kingdom	Blakeway North
2019	Nosso Sangue, Nosso Corpo	Brazil	Fox Lab Brazil/Your Mama

=== Interactivity ===
==== Best Interactive Channel ====
Year	Channel	Country
2006	Scamp	United Kingdom
2007	BiteTV	Canada
2008	WeDigTV	United Kingdom

==== Best Interactive Program ====
Year	Program	Country	Network
2006	Cult	France	France 5
2007	Zimmer Twins	Canada	Teletoon
2007	ReGenesis Extended Reality Game	Canada	The Movie Network / Movie Central
2008	Staraoke	Finland	MTV3 / Cartoon Network

==== Best Interactive TV service ====
Year	TV service	Country	Network
2006	Hello D	South Korea	CJ CableNet
2007	BBCi	United Kingdom	BBC
2008	The Truth About Marika	Sweden	Sveriges Television

=== Digital ===
==== Digital Program: Children & Young People ====
Year	Digital Program: Children & Young People	Country	Network
2009	Battlefront	United Kingdom	Channel 4
2010	Reservoir Hill	United Kingdom	KHF Media Ltd./Television New Zealand/New Zealand On Air
2011	Battlefront II	United Kingdom	Channel 4
2012	Shujaaz.FM	Kenya	Well Told Story
2013	dirtgirlworld...dig it all	Australia	mememe productions/dirtgirlworld productions/Screen Australia
2014	Shujaaz.FM	Kenya	Well Told Story
2015	Reverse the Odds	United Kingdom	Channel 4/Maverick Television/Chunk/Cancer Research UK

==== Digital Program: Fiction ====
Year	Digital Program: Fiction	Country	Network
2009	Scorched	Australia	Firelight Productions/Goalpost Pictures/Essential Media and Entertainment
2010	Primeval Evolved	United Kingdom	ITV1/itv.com/Hoodlum/Impossible Pictures
2011	Shankaboot	Lebanon	Batoota Films
2012	Endgame Interactive: Facebook Episode	Canada	Secret Location
2013	Guidestones	Canada	CTV Television Network
2014	#7DaysLater	Australia	ABC
2015	Dina Foxx: Deadly Contact	Germany	ZDF/UFA/Exozet

==== Digital Program: Non-Fiction ====
Year	Digital Program: Non-Fiction	Country	Network
2009	Britain From Above	United Kingdom	BBC/Lion
2010	Digital Revolution	United Kingdom	BBC/The Open University
2011	HIGHRISE: Out My Window	Canada	Highrise
2012	Live from the Clinic	United Kingdom	Channel 4
2013	Entertainment Experience	Netherlands	FCCE/Ziggo
2014	D-Day As It Happens	United Kingdom	Channel 4
2015	Last Hijack Interactive	Netherlands	Submarine Channel/Razor Film/ZDF/IKON
