= 35th International Emmy Awards =

2007 awards ceremony

- Date: November 19, 2007
- Location: New York Hilton Midtown; New York City
- Hosted by: Roger Bart

Highlights
- Founders Award: Al Gore

The 35th International Emmy Awards took place on November 19, 2007, at the New York Hilton Midtown in New York City and hosted by American actor Roger Bart. The award ceremony, presented by the International Academy of Television Arts and Sciences (IATAS), honors all programming produced and originally aired outside the United States.

The International Academy presented the International Emmys in eleven program categories as well as two special Awards. The Founders Award was presented by Robert De Niro to former U.S. Vice-President Al Gore for his role in launching cable/satellite channel Current TV and his ongoing effort to alert the world to one of the great challenges of our time, global warming. The Directorate Award was presented by actress, Carole Bouquet to Patrick Le Lay, Chairman and CEO of France's TF1 Group for guiding the growth of the TF1 brand from a traditional commercial television broadcaster to a multi-media organization that is a pioneer in many of the emerging new digital platforms.

== Ceremony ==
The International Emmy nominees were announced by the International Academy of Television Arts and Sciences (IATAS) on October 7, 2007, at a press conference at MIPCOM in Cannes, France. A total of 16 countries were nominated for the awards, with the UK topping the list with eight nominations, followed by Brazil with seven. This is the first time ever that Colombia was nominated. The competition took place with three rounds of judging over a period of 6 months, with participation from over 500 judges in 35 countries.

The Oscar winner, Jim Broadbent, shared the best actor award with the Dutch Pierre Bokma. Muriel Robin won the award for best actress for Marie Besnard - The Poisoner, and Simon Schama's Power of Art: Bernini took the prize for arts programming. The best comedy and drama categories were also won by British programs. Poland won its first International Emmy in the Children & Young People category. Brazil, the second country with the largest number of award nominations, left the ceremony without a Win.

=== Presenters ===
The following individuals, listed in order of appearance, presented awards.

Name(s)	Role
Roger Bart	Host from 36th annual International Emmy Awards
Eric Bogosian	Presenter of the award for Arts Programming
Sam Waterston	Presenter of the award for Best Actor
Alan Cumming	Presenter of the award for Best Actress
George Wendt	Presenter of the award for Best Comedy Series
Nai-Chian Katz	Presenter of the award for Best Documentary
Kristen Bell; Rob Morrow	Presenters of the award for Best Drama Series
Katrina Bowden; José Wilker	Presenters of the award for Best Non-Scripted Entertainment
Elmo	Presenter of the award for Children & Young People Series
Gloria Reuben	Presenter of the award for Best TV movie or Mini-Series
Robert De Niro	Presenter of the award for Emmy Founders Award
Carole Bouquet	Presenter of the award for Emmy Directorate Award

== Winners ==
Best Drama Series	Best TV Movie or Miniseries
The Street (United Kingdom) (BBC); Home Affairs (South Africa) (Penguin Films); The Killing (Denmark) (DR/ZDF/NRK/SVT); Mothern (Brazil) (GNT)	Death of a President (United Kingdom) (FilmFour/Borough Films); Antônia (Brazil) (Rede Globo); Toy Train (China) (CCTV-6); Cold Summer (Germany) (WDR)
Best Documentary	Best Arts Programming
Stephen Fry: The Secret Life of the Manic Depressive (United Kingdom) (BBC); In God's Hands (Colombia) (RCN Televisión); Smiling in a War Zone (Denmark) (ZDF/SVT); Dinosaurs vs. Mammals – Secrets of Mammalian Survival (Japan) (NHK)	Simon Schama's Power of Art (United Kingdom) (BBC); Elis Regina: All My Life (Brazil) (Rede Globo); False Waltz (Netherlands) (AVRO Television); Smile (Japan) (NHK)
Best Comedy Series	Best Non-Scripted Entertainment
Little Britain Abroad (United Kingdom) (BBC); Alle lieben Jimmy (Germany) (RTL/GmbH); Os Amadores (Brazil) (Rede Globo); NEO - Office Chuckles (Japan) (NHK); Sorted (South Africa) (SABC/TOM Pictures)	How Do You Solve a Problem like Maria? (United Kingdom) (BBC); Whoever May Fall (Argentina) (Eyeworks); The Prison Choir (Spain) (RTVE); Takeshi Kitano presents Comaneci University Mathematics (Japan) (Fuji TV)
Best Actor	Best Actress
Jim Broadbent in The Street (United Kingdom) (BBC); Pierre Bokma in The Chosen One (Netherlands) (VPRO); Bobby Au-yeung in Dicey Business (Hong Kong) (TVB); Lazaro Ramos in Snakes & Lizards (Brazil) (Rede Globo); Guo Jiaming in My Own Private Deutschland (China) (CCTV-6)	Muriel Robin in The Poisoner (France) (TF1); Lília Cabral in Páginas da Vida (Brazil) (Rede Globo); Brenda Ngxoli in Home Affairs (South Africa) (Penguin Films); Victoria Wood in Housewife 49 (United Kingdom) (ITV)
Best Children & Young People Program
The Magic Tree (Poland) (TVP); The Arena (Singapore) (Mediacorp); Mortified (Australia) (ACTF); Um Menino Muito Maluquinho (Brazil) (TV Brasil)

== Most major nominations ==
By country

- United Kingdom — 8
- Brazil — 7

By network

- BBC — 6
- Rede Globo — 5

== Most major awards ==
By country

- United Kingdom — 7

By network

- BBC — 6
