= International Emmy Award for Best TV Movie or Miniseries =

Television award category

International Emmy Award for Best TV movie or Mini-Series
- Awarded for: Best TV movie or Mini-Series
- Country: United States
- Presented by: IATAS
- First award: 2002
- Currently held by: Lost Boys and Fairies; United Kingdom (2025)
- Website: www.iemmys.tv

The International Emmy Award for Best TV Movie or Miniseries is presented by the International Academy of Television Arts & Sciences (IATAS) to the best miniseries or made-for-television films, initially produced and aired outside the United States.

== Rules & Regulations ==
According to the rules of the International Academy, the award is for a production that has a distinct beginning, middle and end with a finite number of episodes, usually between one and twelve. The program should fit the minimum format length of a televised half-hour time slot. For a TV movie it is considered only a single episode, whereas a miniseries must include more than two episodes. If the show is part of an anthology series, episodes that fall into this category must be more than one hour in length.

== Winners and nominees ==
=== 2000s ===
Year	English title	Original title	Production company/Network	Country
2002	The Manns - Novel Of A Century	Die Manns - Ein Jahrhundertroman	Bavaria Film / WDR / BR / NDR / Arte / ORF / SRG / SFDRS	Germany
2002	The Enclave		All Yours Film / VARA	Netherlands
2002	Perfect Strangers		BBC Two	United Kingdom
2002	Sunday		Sunday Productions / Channel 4	United Kingdom
2003	Coming Back	Mein Vater	Colonia Media / Westdeutscher Rundfunk	Germany
2003	Ramona		Sveriges Television	Sweden
2003	Murder		Tiger Aspect Productions / BBC	United Kingdom
2003	Jean Moulin - A Hero's Desty	Jean Moulin, une affaire française	TF1	France
2004	Henry VIII		Granada Television / ITV	United Kingdom
2004	The Dominici Case	L'Affaire Dominici	TF1	France
2004	The Canterbury Tales		BBC / Ziji Productions	United Kingdom
2004	The Deal		Granada Television / Channel 4	United Kingdom
2005	Young Andersen	Unge Andersen	DR / SVT / Nordisk Film	Denmark
2005	Today is Maria’s Day	Hoje É Dia de Maria	Rede Globo	Brazil
2005	Julie, chevalier de Maupin		Alma Prods / Mascaret Films	France
2005	Hawking		BBC	United Kingdom
2006	Nuit noire 17 octobre 1961		France 3 Cinéma / Canal+	France
2006	Sons of Carnival	Filhos do Carnaval	HBO Brasil	Brazil
2006	The Crown Princess	Kronprinsessan	DR / SVT / SF Studios / TV2 Norge	Sweden
2006	The Virgin Queen		BBC / Power Entertainment	United Kingdom
2007	Death of a President		Film4 / Borough Films	United Kingdom
2007	Antônia		Rede Globo	Brazil
2007	Toy Train		China Movie Channel	China
2007	Cold Summer	Die Mauer - Berlin '61	Westdeutscher Rundfunk	Germany
2008	Televisión por la identidad		Telefe	Argentina
2008	Britz		Daybreak Pictures / Channel 4	United Kingdom
2008	The Miracle of Berlin	Das Wunder von Berlin	ZDF	Germany
2008	Wait for the Birth of the Husband		China Movie Channel	China
2009	The Wolves of Berlin	Die Wölfe	ZDF	Germany
2009	Maysa - When the Heart Sings	Maysa: Quando Fala o Coração	Rede Globo	Brazil
2009	Ultimate Rescue	极限救援	China Movie Channel	China
2009	The Shooting of Thomas Hurndall		Talkback Thames / Channel 4	United Kingdom

=== 2010s ===
Year	English title	Original title	Production company/Network	Country
2010	Small Island		Ruby Films / BBC One	United Kingdom
2010	Hopeville		SABC / Curious Pictures / Heartlines	South Africa
2010	Sound & Fury	Som & Fúria	Rede Globo / O2 Filmes	Brazil
2010	Marcel Reich-Ranicki: The Author of Himself	Mein Leben – Marcel Reich-Ranicki	WDR	Germany
2011	Millennium		SVT / ZDF	Sweden
2011	Mo		ITV Studios / Channel 4	United Kingdom
2011	Operation Checkmate	Operación Jaque	Paraíso Pictures/Pentagrama Films / Caracol TV	Colombia
2011	Shoe-Shine Boy	Shu shain boi	Toho Company / TV Tokyo	Japan
2012	Black Mirror		Zeppotron / Channel 4	United Kingdom
2012	Early Autumn	Shoshû	Chubu-nippon Broadcasting Company / TBS	Japan
2012	The Good Men	Homens de Bem	Rede Globo	Brazil
2012	The Lying Game	L'Infiltré	Aperto Films / Breakout Films / Canal Plus	France
2013	A Day for a Miracle	Das Wunder von Kärnten	Graf Film / ZDF / ORF	Germany
2013	Somos (Episode: "Cadáver se Necesita")		Agadu / Canal 10	Uruguay
2013	Secret State		Company Pictures / Newscope Films / Channel 4	United Kingdom
2013	Heaven's Ark		Above The Line Productions / WOWOW	Japan
2014	Generation War	Unsere Mütter, unsere Väter	ZDF	Germany
2014	Alexander and Other Heroes	Alexandre e Outros Heróis	Rede Globo	Brazil
2014	An Adventure in Space and Time		BBC Wales / BBC America	United Kingdom
2014	Radio		TV Man Union / NHK	Japan
2015	White Soldier	Soldat blanc	Breakout Films / Canal+	France
2015	La Celebración		Telefe	Argentina
2015	Common		LA Productions / BBC One	United Kingdom
2015	Storytelling of Hostages	Hitojichi no Roudokukai	Twins Japan / WOWOW	Japan
2016	Capital		Kudos / BBC One	United Kingdom
2016	The Wise Ones	Os Experientes	O2 Filmes/Rede Globo	Brazil
2016	Naked Among Wolves	Nackt unter Wölfen	UFA Fiction/ARD	Germany
2016	Splash Splash Love	퐁당퐁당 LOVE	MBC	South Korea
2017	Don't Leave Me	Ne m'abandonne pas	Scarlett Production / France 2	France
2017	Reg		LA Productions / BBC One	United Kingdom
2017	Alemão : Both Sides of the Operation	Alemão: Os Dois Lados do Complexo	Rede Globo / O2 Filmes	Brazil
2017	Tokyo Trial		Don Carmody Television / NHK / FATT Productions	Japan
2018	Man in an Orange Shirt		Kudos / BBC	United Kingdom
2018	Blind Spot	Toter Winkel	Geissendoerfer Film & Fernsehproduktion / WDR	Germany
2018	Aldo – Mais Forte Que O Mundo		Globo Filmes / Black Maria / Paris Filmes	Brazil
2018	Kurara: The Dazzling Life of Hokusai's Daughter		Don Carmody Television / NHK / FATT Productions	Japan
2019	Safe Harbour		Matchbox Pictures / SBS	Australia
2019	If I Close My Eyes Now	Se Eu Fechar os Olhos Agora	Rede Globo	Brazil
2019	Trezor		Szupermodern Studio / Duna TV	Hungary
2019	Lust Stories		Skywalk Films / Flying Unicorn Entertainment / RSVP	India

=== 2020s ===
Year	English title	Original title	Production company/Network	Country
2020	Responsible Child		Kudos / 72 films	United Kingdom
2020	Elis - Viver é Melhor que Sonhar		TV Globo / Globo Filmes / Academia de Filmes	Brazil
2020	The Collapse	L'Effondrement	Canal+ / ET Bim / Studio+	France
2020	The Festival of the Little Gods		Tohoku Broadcasting	Japan
2021	Atlantic Crossing		Cinenord / Beta Film / NRK	Norway
2021	Des		New Pictures / ITV	United Kingdom
2021	It's Okay to Not Be Okay	사이코지만 괜찮아	Studio Dragon / Story TV / Goldmedalist	South Korea
2021	All the Women in the World	Todas as Mulheres do Mundo	Globoplay	Brazil
2022	Help		The Forge / All3Media International	United Kingdom
2022	S(he)	Il est elle	Newen Connect / And So On Films	France
2022	Isabel, The Intimate Story of Isabel Allende	Isabel, La Historia Íntima de la Escritora Isabel Allende	Megamedia Chile	Chile
2022	On the Job		Reality MM Studios / Globe Studios / HBO / Warner Media	Philippines
2023	Dive	La Caída	Madam / Filmadora / Infity Hill / Amazon	Mexico
2023	Reborn Rich	재벌집 막내아들	Raemongraein / SLL / ChaebolSPC / VIU	South Korea
2023	Infiniti		Empreinte Digitale / Federation Ent. Belgique	France
2023	Life and Death in the Warehouse		BBC Studios	United Kingdom
2024	Dear Child	Liebes Kind	Constantin Film AG / Netflix	Germany
2024	Deaf Voice: A Sign-Language Interpreter in Court	デフ・ヴォイス 法廷の手話通訳士	NHK	Japan
2024	Anderson Spider Silva		Pródigo Filmes / Paramount+	Brazil
2024	The Sixth Commandment		Wild Mercury Productions / True Vision	United Kingdom
2025	Lost Boys and Fairies		Duck Soup Films	United Kingdom
2025	Amar Singh Chamkila		Window Seat Films / Netflix	India
2025	Herrhausen: The Banker and the Bomb	Herrhausen - Der Herr des Geldes	Sperl Film	Germany
2025	Victory or Death	Vencer or morir	Amazon MGM Studios / Parox S.A.	Chile
2026	The Anatomy of a Moment	Anatomía de un instante	Movistar Plus+ / Dlo Producciones	Spain
2026	Hyper Knife	하이퍼나이프	The Walt Disney Company Korea / CJ ENM Studios / Blaad	South Korea
2026	Oxygen Masks Will Not Drop Down Automatically	Máscaras de Oxigênio Não Cairão Automaticamente	Morena Filmes / Warner Bros. Discovery	Brazil
2026	Prisoner 951		Dancing Ledge Productions Ltd for the BBC	United Kingdom
