= 32nd International Emmy Awards =

2004 awards ceremony

- Date: November 19, 2004
- Location: New York Hilton Hotel; New York City, New York, U.S.
- Hosted by: Graham Norton

Highlights
- Founders Award: MTV International

The 32nd International Emmy Awards took place on November 22, 2004, at the Hilton Hotel in New York City, New York, and hosted by the Irish comedian Graham Norton.

== Ceremony ==
The nominees for the 32nd Emmy International Awards were announced by International Academy of Television Arts and Sciences, on October 4, 2004, at a press conference at MIPCOM in Cannes.

British productions were the big winners of the 2004 International Emmy, winning six of the seven categories, including best documentary and best drama series. The BBC took the prize for best drama with Waking the Dead and best art program with George Orwell: A Life in Pictures.

Channel 4, also from the United Kingdom won an Emmy in the category for documentary The Boy Whose Skin Fell Off. The Emmy for best entertainment program without script was to Brat Camp, and The Illustrated Mum was named best children's program. A production exhibited by ITV about Henry VIII was awarded as the best miniseries. Berlin, Berlin, won the award for best comedy, the only award granted to a non-British work.

The Directorate Award was given to Herbert Kloiber, managing director of the Tele München Group. The Founders Award was delivered to MTV for its contribution to the fight against AIDS and for revolutionizing music on television. The Emmy Ted Cott was delivered to Australian Len Mauger of Nine Network, for their dedication to the International Academy of Television Arts and Sciences in the United States.

== Winners ==
Best Drama Series	Best TV Movie or Miniseries
Waking the Dead (United Kingdom) (BBC); Shameless (United Kingdom) (Channel 4); Schimanski (Germany) (Das Erste); Better Times (Denmark) (DR)	Henry VIII (United Kingdom) (ITV); The Canterbury Tales (United Kingdom) (BBC); The Deal (United Kingdom) (Channel 4); L'Affaire Dominici (France) (TF1)
Best Documentary	Best Arts Programming
The Boy Whose Skin Fell Off (United Kingdom) (Channel 4); Testigo (Chile) (Canal 13); Les origines du SIDA (Canada France) (Galafilm/MFP/Pathe Archives); Seven Wonders of the Industrial World: Hoover Dam (United Kingdom) (BBC)	George Orwell: A Life in Pictures (United Kingdom) (BBC); Korda, Fotografo en Revolucion (Mexico) (Canal Once); Ameila (Canada) (Amerimage-Spectra/Media Principia); Cinema Dalí (Spain France) (Televisió de Catalunya/France 5)
Best Comedy Series	Best Non-Scripted Entertainment
Berlin, Berlin (Germany) (ARD); Corner Gas (Canada) (CTV Television Network); The Newsroom (Canada) (CBC Television); Stokvel (South Africa) (Penguin Films)	Brat Camp (United Kingdom) (Channel 4); Whoever May Fall (Argentina) (Cuatro Cabezas); Wife Swap (United Kingdom) (Channel 4); Greg le millionnaire (France) (TF1)
Best Children & Young People Program
The Illustrated Mum (United Kingdom) (Channel 4); Dunya and Desi (Netherlands) (NPS); Colombia (Netherlands) (KRO); 31 Minutos (Chile) (Televisión Nacional de Chile)

== Most major nominations ==
By country

- United Kingdom — 11
- Canada — 4
- France — 4

By network

- Channel 4 — 6
- BBC — 4

== Most major awards ==
By country

- United Kingdom — 6

By network

- Channel 4 — 3
- BBC — 2
