= Rescue Dina Foxx! =

- Also known as: Wer rettet Dina Foxx? (orig. german title)
- Genre: Transmedia Crime fiction Thriller
- Developed by: Max Zeitler; Kristian Costa-Zahn (Ufa-Lab/online); Burkhard Althoff (ZDF-TV); Milena Bonse (ZDF-online); Leif Alexis (teamWorx/TV); Boris Dennulat; Martha Friedrich; Markus Kaiserswerth; Maxim Kuphal; Drita Parduzi; Philipp Zimmermann
- Written by: TV; Boris Dennulat; Max Zeitler; Online; Philipp Zimmermann
- Directed by: Max Zeitler
- Starring: Jesssika Richter; Max Woelky; Sven Gerhard; Björn Bugri; Thomas Spencer; Natascha Hockwin; Tim Morton Uhlenbrock; Laura Schwickerath
- Theme music composer: Ross Spencer; Robert Galic (RAS)
- Opening theme: Looking at You by Ross Spencer; RAS
- Country of origin: Germany
- Original language: German
- No. of seasons: 1

Production
- Producers: Leif Alexis (TV); Kristian Costa-Zahn (online); Jochen Laube
- Cinematography: Florian Foest
- Editor: Angelika von Charnier
- Running time: 58 minutes project: 6 weeks
- Production companies: teamWorx (TV); Ufa-lab (online)
- Budget: € 320.000

Original release
- Network: ZDF
- Release: April 20, 2011

Rescue Dina Foxx! (orig. German title: Wer rettet Dina Foxx?), is atransmedia event by the German television network Zweites Deutsches Fernsehen (ZDF). Development was helmed by director and co-writer Max Zeitler in cooperation with ZDF, teamWorx and UFA-lab. The event took place in Germany in April/May 2011 and lasted for six weeks combining TV and internet to highlight the dangers of digital identity theft. Rescue Dina Foxx! was marketed as an "interactive crime story" and turned into Germany's largest alternate reality game to date.

A TV-crime thriller introduced the story of Dina Foxx who is arrested for murder but claims her world has been manipulated by a digital doppelganger. The film abruptly ended and invited the audience to "Rescue Dina Foxx" by starting a public investigation on the internet and in reality.

In 2014 ZDF showed the sequel Dina Foxx: Deadly Contact which in 2015 won the Emmy Award in the category Digital Program:Fiction.

== Awards and nominations ==
=== Awards ===
- Banff Television Festival 2012: Interactive: Best Cross-Platform Projekt: Fiction Programs
- Banff Television Festival 2012: Best Interactive Television Programs
- New York Festivals 2012: Gold Medal, Television - Online: Online Entertainment Program
- Verdi TV-Award 2012: Best TV-Script (Boris Dennulat, Max Zeitler)

=== Nominations ===
- Rescue Dina Foxx! was nominated for Prix Europa 2011 Online Awards
- ZDF's commissioning editors of Rescue Dina Foxx!, Burkhard Althoff and Milena Bonse, were nominated for Grimme Awards 2011 in the category "Special Achievement in TV Fiction"
- The title sequence of the TV film Rescue Dina Foxx! was a finalist at the SXSW Film Design Awards "Excellence in Title Design". The title sequence was produced by weareflink GmbH.
