= Kronprinsessan =

- Genre: Drama
- Created by: Hanne-Vibeke Holst
- Written by: Sara Heldt; Pia Gradvall
- Directed by: Kathrine Windfeld
- Country of origin: Sweden
- Original language: Swedish
- No. of seasons: 1
- No. of episodes: 4

Production
- Running time: 58 minutes
- Production companies: Svensk filmindustri SVT Drama

Original release
- Network: SVT1
- Release: 27 February 2006 – 2006

Kronprinsessan (English: The Crown Princess) is a Swedish drama series based on Hanne-Vibeke Holst's novel with the same name and aired February–March 2006 by Sveriges Television.

== Cast ==
- Alexandra Rapaport – Charlotte Ekeblad
- Ulf Friberg – Thomas Ekeblad
- Kenneth Milldoff – Prime Minister Per Viksten
- Reine Brynolfsson – Finance Minister Gert Jakobsson
- Susanne Reuter – Foreign Minister Elizabeth Meyer
- Daniel Götschenhjelm – Jacob Steen
- Peter Schildt – Henrik Sand
- Morgan Alling – Magnus Svensson
- Ida Wahlund – Louise Kramer
- Sten Elfström – Agriculture Minister Hans Bengtsson
- Peter Engman – Jesper Anell

== Awards ==
Year	Award	Category	Result
2006	34th International Emmy Awards	Best TV movie or Miniseries	Nominated
