= International Emmy Award for Best Drama Series =

Television award

- Country: United States
- Presented by: International Academy of Television Arts and Sciences
- First award: 2002
- Currently held by: Rivals; United Kingdom (2025)
- Website: www.iemmys.tv

The International Emmy Award for Best Drama Series is presented by the International Academy of Television Arts & Sciences (IATAS) during the International Emmy Awards ceremony. The category is described on the official International Academy website as being open to drama series that are “a dramatic production in which theme, storyline, and main characters are presented under the same title, with the intention to develop beyond a first season.” The award was first presented in 2002, recognizing programs broadcast in 2001. From 1979 to 2001, the category was presented as Best Drama.

== Rules and regulations ==
According to the rules of the International Academy, the award is given to a dramatic production in which the theme, plot, and main characters are presented under the same title. The program must meet the minimum format length of a televised half-hour time slot and must have been broadcast during the eligibility period.

If the program is part of an anthology series (i.e., each episode presents a different story and a different set of characters), episodes submitted in this category must be less than or equal to one hour in length. Two episodes must be submitted.

== Winners and nominees ==
=== 2000s ===
Year	English title	Original title	Recipients	Production company/Network	Country
2002	Unit One	Rejseholdet	Peter Thorsboe	Danmarks Radio	Denmark
2002	All Stars		Jean Van de Velde	VARA	Netherlands
2002	Always Greener		Bevan Lee	Seven Network	Australia
2002	At Home with the Braithwaites		Sally Wainwright	Yorkshire Television/ITV	United Kingdom
2003	Nikolaj og Julie		Adam Price	Danmarks Radio	Denmark
2003	Waking the Dead		Barbara Machin	BBC One	United Kingdom
2003	Cuéntame cómo pasó		Miguel Ángel Bernardeau	Grupo Ganga / La 1	Spain
2003	MDA		Greg Haddrick, Des Monaghan	ABC	Australia
2004	Waking the Dead		Barbara Machin	BBC One	United Kingdom
2004	Krøniken		Stig Thorsbøe	Danmarks Radio	Denmark
2004	Shameless		Paul Abbott	Channel 4	United Kingdom
2004	Schimanski		Edward Berger and Mario Giordano	Colonia Media / WDR	Germany
2005	The Eagle	Ørnen: En krimi-odyssé	Peter Thorsboe, Mai Brostrom	Danmarks Radio	Denmark
2005	Spooks		David Wolstencroft	BBC One	United Kingdom
2005	New Tricks		Nigel McCrery, Roy Mitchell	Wall to Wall / BBC One	United Kingdom
2005	The Cadets	Курсанты	Andrey Kavun	Channel One Russia	Russia
2006	Life on Mars		Matthew Graham, Tony Jordan, Ashley Pharoah	Kudos / BBC	United Kingdom
2006	Mandrake		Rubem Fonseca, José Henrique Fonseca	Conspiração Filmes / HBO Brasil	Brazil
2006	Little Missy	Sinhá Moça	Benedito Ruy Barbosa	TV Globo	Brazil
2006	Vincent		Stephen Butchard	Granada Television / ITV	United Kingdom
2007	The Street		Jimmy McGovern	BBC One / ITV Studios	United Kingdom
2007	Mandrake		Rubem Fonseca, José Henrique Fonseca	Conspiração Filmes / HBO Brasil	Brazil
2007	The Killing	Forbrydelsen	Søren Sveistrup	Danmarks Radio	Denmark
2007	Home Affairs		Roberta Durrant	Penguin Films / SABC	South Africa
2008	Life on Mars		Matthew Graham, Tony Jordan, Ashley Pharoah	Kudos / BBC	United Kingdom
2008	Mandrake		Rubem Fonseca, José Henrique Fonseca	Conspiração Filmes / HBO Brasil	Brazil
2008	The Killing	Forbrydelsen	Søren Sveistrup	Danmarks Radio	Denmark
2008	Home Affairs		Roberta Durrant	Penguin Films / SABC	South Africa
2009	The Protectors	Livvagterne	Peter Thorsboe	Danmarks Radio	Denmark
2009	Capadocia		Argos Comunicación	HBO Latin America	Mexico
2009	The Kingdom of the Winds	바람의 나라	Choi Wan-kyu, Jin-ok Jeong	Chorokbaem Media / KBS	South Korea
2009	Sokhulu & Partners		Paw Paw Films	SABC	South Africa
2009	Spooks		David Wolstencroft	BBC	United Kingdom

=== 2010s ===
Year	English title	Original title	Recipients	Production company/Network	Country
2010	The Street		Jimmy McGovern	BBC One	United Kingdom
2010	The Killing	Forbrydelsen	Søren Sveistrup	Danmarks Radio	Denmark
2010	Epitafios		Marcelo Slavich, Walter Slavich	Pol-Ka Producciones / HBO	Argentina
2010	Saka no Ue no Kumo		Hisashi Nozawa	NHK	Japan
2011	Accused		Jimmy McGovern	BBC One / RSJ Films	United Kingdom
2011	Spiral	Engrenages	Alexandra Clert, Guy-Patrick Sainderichin	Canal+	France
2011	Saka no Ue no Kumo		Hisashi Nozawa	NHK	Japan
2011	Na Forma da Lei		Antônio Calmon	TV Globo	Brazil
2012	Braquo		Olivier Marchal	Canal+	France
2012	ICAC Investigators		TVB	RTHK	Hong Kong
2012	The Kitchen Musical		Chee Kong Cheah	The Group Entertainment / AXN Asia	Singapore
2012	The Slap		Brendan Cowell	Matchbox Pictures / ABC	Australia
2012	El Líder Social		Pol-ka Producciones	Artear / El Trece	Argentina
2013	The Returned	Les Revenants	Fabrice Gobert	Canal+ / Haut et Court	France
2013	Maalaala Mo Kaya		ABS-CBN	ABS-CBN Corporation	Philippines
2013	Accused		Jimmy McGovern	BBC One / RSJ Films	United Kingdom
2013	Next in Line	O Brado Retumbante	Euclydes Marinho	TV Globo	Brazil
2014	Utopia		Dennis Kelly	Kudos / Channel 4	United Kingdom
2014	Prófugos		Pablo Illanes, Josefina Fernández	HBO Latin America	Chile
2014	The Tunnel	Tunnel	Ben Richards, Hans Rosenfeldt	Sky Atlantic / Canal+ / Kudos / Shine France	France
2014	Yae's Sakura	八重の桜 / Yae no Sakura	Mutsumi Yamamoto	NHK	Japan
2015	Spiral	Engrenages	Alexandra Clert	Canal+ / Son et Lumière	France
2015	Mozu		Eiichirō Hasumi	TBS / Wowow / Robot	Japan
2015	My Mad Fat Diary		Rae Earl	E4 / Tiger Aspect Productions / Drama Republic	United Kingdom
2015	Psi		Contardo Calligaris	HBO Brasil	Brazil
2016	Deutschland 83		Jorg Winger, Anna Winger	RTL / UFA Fiction	Germany
2016	19-2		Adrian Holmes, Jared Keeso	CTV / Sphere Media / Echo Media / Bell Media	Canada
2016	La casa del mar		Juan Pablo Laplace	OnDirecTV / Cisne Films / Storylab	Argentina
2016	Waiting for Jasmin	بانتظار الياسمين (مسلسل)	Osama Kokash	ABC Marketing and Distribution	United Arab Emirates
2017	Mammon		Vegard and Gjermund Stenberg Eriksen	NRK / NRK Drama	Norway
2017	Moribito: Guardian of the Spirit		Sumio Omori	NHK	Japan
2017	Above Justice	Justiça	Manuela Dias	Estúdios Globo / TV Globo	Brazil
2017	Wanted		Rebecca Gibney	Seven Network / Matchbox Pictures / R&R Productions	Australia
2018	Money Heist	La casa de papel	Álex Pina, Esther Martinez Lobato	Vancouver / Atresmedia / Antena 3	Spain
2018	Urban Myths		Sky Arts	Happy Tramp / Sky UK	United Kingdom
2018	Inside Edge		Karan Anshuman	Amazon Studios / Excel Entertainment	India
2018	1 Contra Todos		Thomas Stavros, Gustavo Lipsztein, Breno Silveira	Conspiração Filmes / Fox Brasil	Brazil
2019	McMafia		Hossein Amini, James Watkins	Cuba Pictures / BBC One	United Kingdom
2019	Bad Banks		Oliver Kienle	Letterbox Filmproduktion / Iris Productions / ZDF	Germany
2019	1 Contra Todos		Thomas Stavros, Gustavo Lipsztein, Breno Silveira	Conspiração Filmes / Fox Brasil	Brazil
2019	Sacred Games		Varun Grover	Phantom Films / Netflix	India

=== 2020s ===
Year	English title	Original title	Recipients	Production company/Network	Country
2020	Delhi Crime		Richie Mehta	Golden Karavan / Ivanhoe Productions / FilmKaravan / Poor Man's Productions / Netflix	India
2020	Charité		Dorothee Schön	UFA Fiction / Das Erste	Germany
2020	Criminal: UK		George Kay, Jim Field Smith	Idiotlamp Productions / Netflix	United Kingdom
2020	El jardín de bronce		Gustavo Malajovich, Marcos Osorio Vidal	HBO / Pol-ka Producciones	Argentina
2021	Tehran		Moshe Zonder	Donna and Paper Plane Productions / Kan 11	Israel
2021	Aarya		Ram Madhvani, Sandeep Modi	Endemol / Hotstar	India
2021	El presidente		Armando Bó	Gaumont / Amazon Studios	Chile
2021	There She Goes		Shaun Pye	Merman Television / BBC Two	United Kingdom
2022	Vigil		Tom Edge	World Productions / BBC One	United Kingdom
2022	Lupin		George Kay, François Uzan	Netflix / Gaumont Television	France
2022	Reyka		Rohan Dickson	tpf london / Quizzical / Serena Cullen Productions / M-Net / Fremantle / Heromotives	South Africa
2022	Narcos: Mexico		Carlo Bernard, Chris Brancato, Doug Miro	Netflix / Gaumont	Mexico
2023	The Empress	Die Kaiserin	Katharina Eyssen	Sommerhaus Serien	Germany
2023	Extraordinary Attorney Woo	이상한 변호사 우영우 / Isanghan Byeonhosa U-yeong-u	Moon Ji-won	AStory / KT Studio Genie	South Korea
2023	Yosi, the Regretful Spy	Iosi, el espía arrepentido	Daniel Burman	Oficina Burman / Amazon	Argentina / Uruguay
2023	The Devil's Hour		Tom Moran	Hartswood Films / Amazon	United Kingdom
2024	Drops of God	神の雫 / Les Gouttes de Dieu	Dang Tran	Legendary Entertainment / Les Productions Dynamic / 22H22 / Adline Entertainment / France Télévisions / Hulu	France / Japan
2024	The Newsreader		Michael Lucas	Werner Film Productions / Australian Broadcasting Corporation / eOne	Australia
2024	The Night Manager		Sandeep Modi	Disney+ Hotstar / Banijay Asia / Ink Factory	India
2024	Yosi, the Regretful Spy	Iosí, el espía arrepentido	Daniel Burman	Amazon MGM Studios	Argentina / Uruguay
2025	Rivals		Dominic Treadwell-Collins	Happy Prince part of ITV Studios / Disney+	United Kingdom
2025	Women in Blue	Las Azules	Pablo Aramendi, Fernando Rovzar	Lemon Studios / Apple TV+	Mexico
2025	Bad Boy	ילד רע	Ron Leshem, Hagar Ben Asher	Sipur Studios / North Road Company / Tedy Prod. / Hot	Israel
2025	Cake	Koek	Christiaan Olwagen	Wolflight	South Africa
2026	A Thousand Blows		Steven Knight	The Story Collective / Matriarch Productions / Water & Power Productions / Disney+	United Kingdom
2026	Carême		Martin Bourboulon	Vvz / Shine Fiction / Apple TV	France
2026	Menem		Mariano Varela	Claxson / Amazon MGM Studios	Argentina
2026	Real Kashmir Football Club		Mahesh Mathai	Sony Liv / Jaya Entertainment / Oshun Entertainment	India

== Multiple nominations ==
TV series

Nominations	TV series
3	The Killing
2	Waking the Dead
2	Life on Mars
2	The Street
2	Mandrake
2	Home Affairs
2	Spooks
2	Accused
2	Spiral
2	1 Contra Todos
2	Saka no Ue no Kumo

Country

Nominations	Country
20	United Kingdom
10	Brazil
8	Denmark
5	Japan
4	Argentina
4	Australia
4	France
4	India
3	Germany
3	South Africa
2	Spain

== Multiple wins ==
TV series

Wins	TV series
2	The Street
2	Life on Mars

Country

Wins	Country
9	United Kingdom
4	Denmark
4	France
