= 41st Emmy Awards =

41st Emmy Awards may refer to:

- 41st Primetime Emmy Awards, held in 1989
- 41st Daytime Emmy Awards, held in 2014
- 41st International Emmy Awards, held in 2016
