= 39th International Emmy Awards =

2011 awards ceremony

- Date: November 21, 2011
- Location: New York Hilton Midtown; New York City, New York, U.S.
- Hosted by: Jason Priestley

Highlights
- Founders Award: Nigel Lythgoe

The 39th International Emmy Awards took place on November 21, 2011, in New York City, and was hosted by actor Jason Priestley. The award ceremony, presented by the International Academy of Television Arts and Sciences (IATAS), honors all TV programming produced and originally aired outside the United States.

== Ceremony ==
Nominations for the 39th International Emmy Awards were announced on October 3, 2011, by the International Academy of Television Arts & Sciences (IATAS) at a Press Conference at Mipcom in Cannes. A record number of 20 countries competed for the International Emmys in 2011, they are: Argentina, Australia, Belgium, Brazil, Canada, Chile, China, Colombia, France, Germany, Japan, Malaysia, Mexico, Portugal, Singapore, South Korea, Spain, Sweden, the Philippines and the United Kingdom. Brazil's TV Globo led the nominations for the award, as it did in the last edition.

In addition to the presentation of the International Emmys for programming and performances, the International Academy presented two special awards. Veteran British producer Nigel Lythgoe, co-creator and executive producer of So You Think You Can Dance and executive producer of American Idol, received the Founders Award and Subhash Chandra, Chairman Zee Entertainment Enterprises Ltd, received the Directorate Award.

== Winners and nominees ==
Best Telenovela	Best Drama Series
Laços de Sangue (Portugal) (SIC/Rede Globo); Araguaia (Brazil) (Rede Globo); Contra las cuerdas (Argentina) (ON TV); Impostor (Philippines) (ABS-CBN)	Accused (United Kingdom) (BBC One); Na Forma da Lei (Brazil) (Rede Globo); Spiral (France) (Canal+); Saka no Ue no Kumo (Japan) (NHK)
Best TV Movie or Miniseries	Best Arts Programming
Millennium (Sweden) (SVT/ZDF); Mo (United Kingdom) (Channel 4); Operación Jaque (Colombia) (Caracol Televisión); Shu shain boi (Japan) (TV Tokyo)	Gareth Malone Goes to Glyndebourne (United Kingdom) (Twenty Twenty); Por Toda Minha Vida: Adoniran Barbosa (Brazil) (Rede Globo); Memories of Origin (Japan) (Wowow); In der Werkstatt Beethovens - Die Neunte, Thielemann und die Wiener Philharmoniker (Germany) (ZDF)
Best Comedy Series	Best Documentary
Benidorm Bastards (Belgium) (Shelter/VMMA); Separação?! (Brazil) (Rede Globo); Facejacker (United Kingdom) (Channel 4); The Noose (Singapore) (MediaCorp TV)	Life with Murder (Canada) (NFB); Confesión de un sicario (Argentina) (Turner Argentina); 7 Years in the Tanaka Family (Japan) (Fuji TV); Wild Japan (Germany) (GmbH/ORF/ARTE/National Geographic)
Best Actor	Best Actress
Christopher Eccleston in Accused (United Kingdom) (BBC); Fábio Assunção in Songs of Betrayal (Brazil) (Rede Globo); Michael Nyqvist in Millennium (Sweden) (SVT/ZDF); Jang Hyuk in The Slave Hunters (South Korea) (KBS)	Julie Walters in Mo (United Kingdom) (Channel 4); Adriana Esteves in Songs of Betrayal (Brazil) (Rede Globo); Noomi Rapace in Millennium (Sweden) (SVT/ZDF); Athena Chu in A Wall-less World (Hong Kong) (RTHK)
Best Non-Scripted Entertainment	Best Children & Young People Program
The World's Strictest Parents (United Kingdom) (Twenty Twenty)'; The Master Show (South Korea) (KBS); El Hormiguero (Spain) (7 y accion); La Expedicion (Mexico) (RM 5to Elemento/Zodiak Media/Teletón)	What is your Dream? (Chile) CNTV/TVN; Dance Academy (Australia) (ACTF/ZDF/ABC); Allein gegen die Zeit (Germany) (NDR); Saladin (Malaysia) (JeemTV/MDEC)

== Most major nominations ==
By country

- United Kingdom — 7
- Brazil — 6
