= 40th International Emmy Awards =

2012 awards ceremony

- Promotional poster
- Date: November 19, 2012
- Location: New York Hilton Midtown; New York City, New York, U.S.
- Hosted by: Regis Philbin

Highlights
- Founders Award: Ryan Murphy

Television/radio coverage
- Network: MGM (Portugal)

The 40th International Emmy Awards took place on November 19, 2012, in New York City, and hosted by Regis Philbin. The award ceremony, presented by the International Academy of Television Arts and Sciences (IATAS), honors all TV programming produced and originally aired outside the United States.

In addition to the presentation of the International Emmys for programming and performances, the International Academy presented two special awards. Ryan Murphy, Alan Alda and Norman Lear, received the Founders Award and Kim In-Kyu, president and CEO of Korean Broadcasting System, received the Directorate Award.

== Ceremony ==
Nominations for the 40th International Emmy Awards were announced on October 8, 2012, by the International Academy of Television Arts & Sciences (IATAS) at a Press Conference at Mipcom in Cannes. There are 38 nominees in 9 categories. Nominations span 15 countries: Argentina, Australia, Belgium, Brazil, China, Denmark, France, Germany, Japan, Norway, Portugal, Singapore, South Korea, Spain and the United Kingdom. This year's the International Emmy competitions have three rounds of judging over a period of 6 months, with participation from jurors across 67 countries.

In celebration of the International Emmys 40th anniversary, the International Academy paid tribute to Alan Alda and Norman Lear with Special Founders Awards. Also, the 2012 International Emmy Founders Award was presented to producer/writer Ryan Murphy, Co-creator & Executive Producer of Glee while the 2012 International Emmy Directorate Award was presented to Dr. Kim In-Kyu, President & CEO of KBS, also President of the ABU.

== Broadcast ==
A special edition of the ceremony aired on December 9, 2012, by MGM Portugal.

== Winners and nominees ==
Best Telenovela	Best Drama Series
The Illusionist (Brazil) (Rede Globo); Rosa Fogo (Portugal) (SIC); Remédio Santo (Portugal) (TVI); Indomitable Daughters-in-Law (South Korea) (MBC)	Braquo (France) (Canal+); ICAC Investigators (Hong Kong) (RTHK); The Kitchen Musical (Singapore) (AXN); The Slap (Australia) (ABC); The Social Leader (Argentina) (Pol-ka)
Best TV Movie or Miniseries	Best Arts Programming
Black Mirror (United Kingdom) (Channel 4); Early Autumn (Japan) (CBC); Homens de Bem (Brazil) (Rede Globo/Casa de Cinema); L'Infiltré (France) (Canal+)	Musik als Waffe (Germany) (ZDF); Por Toda Minha Vida: Cartola (Brazil) (Rede Globo); Blue Man x Kodo: Blue Man Meets Wadaiko (Japan) (WOWOW); Queen: Days of Our Lives (United Kingdom) (BBC)
Best Comedy Series	Best Documentary
The Invisible Woman (Brazil) (Rede Globo); Absolutely Fabulous (United Kingdom) (BBC); Spy (United Kingdom) (Sky 1); Wat Als? (Belgium) (Shelter)	Terry Pratchett: Choosing to Die (United Kingdom) (BBC); Across Land, Across Sea (South Korea) (The Chosun Ilbo); El escape de Hitler a la Argentina (Argentina) (History Channel/Anima Films); Der Wettlauf zum Südpol (Germany) (ZDF)
Best Actor	Best Actress
Darío Grandinetti in Televisión x la inclusión (Argentina) (ON TV Contenidos); Arthur Acuña in The Kitchen Musical (Singapore) (AXN); Jason Isaacs in Case Histories (United Kingdom) (BBC); Stein Winge in Koselig med peis (Norway) (NRK); Yawen Zhu in Departed Heroes (China) (H.Brothers Tianyi Movie & TV)	Cristina Banegas in Televisión x la inclusión (Argentina) (ON TV Contenidos); Sidse Babett Knudsen in Borgen (Denmark) (DR); Joanna Vanderham in The Runaway (United Kingdom) (Sky 1); Rina Sa in Zhong guo di (Hong Kong) (Phoenix Television)
Best Non-Scripted Entertainment
The Amazing Race Australia (Australia) (Seven Network); The Challenger Muay Thai (Singapore) (AXN); El Hormiguero (Spain) (Antena 3); Planeta Extremo (Brazil) (Rede Globo)
