= 30th International Emmy Awards =

2002 awards ceremony

- Date: November 25, 2002
- Location: Sheraton New York Times Square Hotel; New York City
- Hosted by: Donna Hanover

Highlights
- Founders Award: Sir Howard Stringer

The 30th International Emmy Awards took place on November 25, 2002, in New York City and hosted by TV personality Donna Hanover. The award ceremony, presented by the International Academy of Television Arts and Sciences (IATAS), honors all programming produced and originally aired outside the United States.

== Ceremony ==
The nominees to the International Emmys, were announced by International Academy of Television Arts & Sciences (IATAS) on October 8, 2002, at a press conference at MIPCOM in Cannes. The International Academy announced the winners of the 30th International Emmy Awards in a ceremony gala at the Sheraton New York hosted by Donna Hanover. Joining her as presenters were Mia Farrow, Angela Lansbury, Joan Collins and Lauren Holly.

Denmark's Rejseholdet, a police drama based on real crimes, won the Drama Series award. The Slovak Republic won in the Documentary category with The Power of Good, the story of a man who saved more than 600 Czechoslovak Jewish children from the Nazis in 1939. Germany won the TV Movie/Mini-series category with Die Manns – Ein Jahrhundertroman, a tale about the novel-writing Mann family.

British television show The Kumars at No. 42 shared the award for best popular arts programme with Channel 4's Faking It. BBC One's Stig of the Dump, the story of a child who befriends a caveman, won the Children and Young People's award. John Simpson and his BBC colleague Joe Phua won the News Coverage prize for their November 2001 report Fall Of Kabul, which showed Northern Alliance troops advancing on the Afghan capital. Canada received an arts programming award for Dracula: Pages from a Virgin's Diary, a mix of avant-garde film and choreography based on an original full-length ballet.

The International Academy, paid tribute Katsuji Ebisawa, president of NHK Japan Broadcasting, with the Directorate Emmy Award while the Founder's Emmy Award went to Sir Howard Stringer, chairman and chief executive officer of Sony Corporation of America.

== Winners ==
Best Drama Series	Best TV Movie or Miniseries
Rejseholdet (Denmark) (DR1); All stars: De serie (Netherlands) (VARA); Always Greener (Australia) (Seven Network); At Home with the Braithwaites (United Kingdom) (ITV)	The Manns - Novel of a Century (Germany) (WDR/BR/NDR/ORF/SRG); The Enclave (Netherlands) (VARA); Perfect Strangers (United Kingdom) (BBC); Sunday (United Kingdom) (Channel 4)
Best Documentary	Best Arts Programming
The Power of Good: Nicholas Winton (Slovakia) (Czech Television/Slovak Television); Offspring (Canada) (CBC Television); Decision at Age 18 - Israeli Youths Refuse to Fight (Japan) (NHK); City Slickers: A Tale of Two African Penguins (South Africa) (Pelican Pictures)	Dracula: Pages from a Virgin's Diary (Canada) (CBC); Touch (Netherlands) (NPS); The Tragedy of Hamlet (United Kingdom) (BBC); Classic Albums: Elton John - Goodbye Yellow Brick Road (Japan) (Isis Production/Eagle Rock Entertainment)
Best Popular Arts Program	Best News Coverage
The Kumars at No. 42 (United Kingdom) (BBC); Faking It (United Kingdom) (Channel 4); Whoever May Fall (Argentina) (Cuatro Cabezas); Ladykracher (Germany) (Brainpool TV)	BBC News at Ten in Fall of Kabul (United Kingdom) (BBC); Jornal Nacional in September 11 (Brazil) (Rede Globo); RTL aktuell in Terror Against America (Germany) (RTL Television); ITN/ITV in Attack on America (United Kingdom) (ITN Productions)
Best Children & Young People Program
Stig of the Dump (United Kingdom) (CBBC/Childsplay Television); Being Eve (New Zealand) (South Pacific Pictures); Trickboxx (Germany) (ARD/ZDF); Harold Peeble (France) (France 3)
