= 31st International Emmy Awards =

2003 awards ceremony

- Date: November 24, 2003
- Location: New York Hilton Hotel; New York City, New York, U.S.
- Hosted by: Bob Costas

Highlights
- Founders Award: HBO

The 31st International Emmy Awards took place on November 24, 2003, at the Hilton Hotel in New York City. The ceremony was hosted by Bob Costas.

== Ceremony ==
The nominees for the 31st International Emmy Awards were announced by International Academy of Television Arts and Sciences, on October 10, 2003, at a press conference at MIPCOM in Cannes. The United Kingdom led the list of nominees the 31st edition of the International Emmy Awards with 10 nominees, followed by Germany with 5 nominations. Japan pocketed two, the BBC was the broadcaster with the largest number of indicated programs, six in total.

The BBC was the big winner of the night taking home three awards, including the Children & Young People Award for Legend of the Lost Tribe. The project was a co-production between BBC Bristol and Comic Relief. The Kumars at No. 42 won the best popular arts award, while Arena: The Life and Times of Count Luchino Visconti took best arts programme.

The evening was highlighted by a program from Denmark being honored for the second year in a row in the Drama Series category -- Nikolaj og Julie from DR1. Additionally, programs from Germany were awarded in two categories. Colonia Media Filmproduktion GmbH's Mein Vater captured the TV Movies/Mini-Series category and Das Leben geht weiter took the Documentary category for Starcrest Media GmbH.

Channel 4's Without Prejudice won the popular arts category. The Channel 4 had already been handed the news coverage Emmy for The Fall of Saddam at a National Television Academy news and documentary ceremony in September.

Bob Costas and Sarah Jessica Parker were invited by the International Academy to present the 31st edition gala. Parker presented the International Emmy Founders Award to HBO, for its innovative programming, Greg Dyke - BBC director general - received the International Emmy Directorate Award, for outstanding services to broadcasting.

== Winners ==
Best Drama Series	Best TV Movie or Miniseries
Nikolaj og Julie (Denmark) (DR1); Remember When (Spain) (Televisión Española); MDA (Australia) (ABC); Waking the Dead (United Kingdom) (BBC)	Coming Home (Germany) (WDR); Ramona (Sweden) (SVT); Jean Moulin – A Hero’s Destiny (France) (TF1); Murder (United Kingdom) (BBC)
Best Documentary	Best Arts Programming
Life Goes On (Germany) (GmbH); Stalingrad (Germany) (ZDF); Avenging Terror (United Kingdom) (Channel 4); The Last Peasants (United Kingdom) (Channel 4)	Arena (United Kingdom) (BBC); Visions of Space (United Kingdom) (BBC); Viaje al centro de la música (Chile) (Canal 13); Living Architecture: The Work of Tadao Ando (Japan) (NHK)
Best Comedy Series	Best Non-Scripted Entertainment
The Kumars at No. 42 (United Kingdom) (BBC); Alt und durchgeknallt (Germany) (Brainpool TV); The Perfect Manual (Japan) (TV Asahi); Lenny Henry in Pieces (United Kingdom) (BBC)	Without Prejudice? (United Kingdom) (Channel 4); Whoever May Fall (Argentina) (Cuatro Cabezas); Home on Their Own (United Kingdom) (ITV); Me lo dices o me lo cuentas (Spain) (Telemadrid)
Best Children & Young People Program
Legend of the Lost Tribe (United Kingdom) (BBC); The Little Polar Bear (Germany) (Westdeutscher Rundfunk); It burns! (Sweden) (SVT); An Angel for May (United Kingdom) (Portman Film/Guerilla Films/Allumination FilmWorks)
