= 33rd International Emmy Awards =

2005 awards ceremony

- Date: November 21, 2005
- Location: New York Hilton Hotel; New York City, New York, U.S.
- Hosted by: Graham Norton

Highlights
- Founders Award: Oprah Winfrey

The 33rd International Emmy Awards took place on November 21, 2005, at the Hilton Hotel in New York City, New York and hosted by Irish comedian Graham Norton. The International Academy have introduced two new categories for this year’s ceremony; Best Performance by an Actor and Best Performance by an Actress.

== Ceremony ==
37 TV shows from 10 countries were nominated in nine categories for the 33rd International Emmy Awards, Russia for the first time disputed the award in the drama series category. The nominees were selected over six months, by 500 judges representing 35 countries.

Denmark which has won the best drama award three out of the past four years, received Emmys in both the drama and miniseries categories for crime drama The Eagle, and miniseries Young Andersen, about storyteller Hans Christian Andersen.

Canadian TV series The Newsroom beat BBC show Little Britain, among others, to the comedy award while Canada's Dark Oracle won in the children and young people category.

Long-running BBC Two series Top Gear won the Emmy for best non-scripted entertainment, and documentary Holocaust – A Musical Memorial Film from Auschwitz scooped a best arts programming award for BBC.

In the performance category – a recent addition to the awards – Thierry Frémont won the best actor award by the French television film Dans la tête du tueur, beating Little Britain's David Walliams and Rhys Ifans, who played Peter Cook in Not Only But Always.

German production Das Drama von Dresden was named best documentary while the best actress prize went to China's He Lin for her performance in Slave Mother.

In addition to the presentation of the International Emmy Awards for programming and performances, the Academy presented two special awards. Oprah Winfrey received the Founders Award for her philanthropic initiatives in international broadcasting career, and the British broadcaster ITV received the 2005 International Emmy Directorate Award for outstanding contributions to the television industry.

== Winners ==
Best Drama Series	Best TV Movie or Miniseries
The Eagle (Denmark) (DR); The Cadets (Russia) (Channel One Russia); New Tricks (United Kingdom) (BBC); Spooks (United Kingdom) (BBC)	Young Andersen (Denmark) (DR); Today is Maria's Day (Brazil) (Rede Globo); Julie, chevalier de Maupin (France) (TF1); Hawking (United Kingdom) (BBC)
Best Documentary	Best Arts Programming
The Drama of Dresden (Germany) (ZDF); Se Busca (Chile) (Canal 13); The House of Saud (United Kingdom) (BBC); Prostitution: Behind the Veil (Denmark) (SVT)	Holocaust: A Music Memorial Film from Auschwitz (United Kingdom) (BBC); Arena (United Kingdom) (BBC); Bergman och filmen (Sweden) (SVT); Bergman och Fårö (Sweden) (SVT)
Best Comedy Series	Best Non-Scripted Entertainment
The Newsroom (Canada) (CBC Television); Berlin, Berlin (Germany) (ARD); Ohne Worte (Germany) (GmbH); Little Britain (United Kingdom) (BBC)	Top Gear (United Kingdom) (BBC); Whoever May Fall (Argentina) (Cuatro Cabezas); FC Zulu (Denmark) (TV 2 Zulu); Borat's Television Programme (United Kingdom) (Channel 4)
Best Actor	Best Actress
Thierry Fremont in Dans la tête du tueur (France) (TF1); Rhys Ifans in Not Only But Always (United Kingdom) (Channel 4); Douglas Silva in City of Men (Brazil) (Rede Globo); David Walliams in Little Britain (United Kingdom) (BBC)	He Lin in Slave Mother (China) (CCTV-6); Anneke von der Lippe in At the King's Table (Norway) (NRK); Carolina Oliveira in Today is Maria's Day (Brazil) (Rede Globo); Catherine Tate in The Catherine Tate Show (United Kingdom) (BBC)
Best Children & Young People Program
Dark Oracle (Canada) (YTV); Dunya en Desie (Netherlands) (NPS); My Life as a Popat (United Kingdom) (ITV); Zoé Kézako (France) (TF1)

== Most major nominations ==
By country

- United Kingdom — 13
- Brazil — 3
- Denmark — 3
- France — 3
- Germany — 3
- Canada — 2
- Sweden — 2
- Argentina — 1
- Chile — 1
- China — 1
- Netherlands — 1
- Norway — 1
- Russia — 1

By network

- BBC — 9
- Rede Globo — 3
- SVT — 3
- Channel 4 — 2
- DR — 2
- TF1 — 2
- ARD — 1
- Canal 13 — 1
- CBC — 1
- CCTV — 1
- Channel One Russia — 1
- Cuatro Cabezas — 1
- GmbH — 1
- ITV — 1
- NPS — 1
- NRK — 1
- TV 2 Zulu — 1
- YTV — 1
- ZDF — 1

== Most major awards ==
By country

- United Kingdom — 3
- Canada — 2

By network

- BBC — 2
- DR — 2
