= 42nd International Emmy Awards =

2014 awards ceremony

- Date: November 24, 2014
- Location: New York Hilton Hotel; New York City, New York, U.S.
- Hosted by: Matt Lucas

Highlights
- Founders Award: Matthew Weiner

The 42nd International Emmy Awards took place November 24, 2014 in New York City and hosted by British comedian Matt Lucas. The award ceremony, presented by the International Academy of Television Arts and Sciences (IATAS), honors all TV programming produced and originally aired outside the United States.

== Summary ==
Country	Nominations	Wins
United Kingdom	6	3
Brazil	5	1
United States	4	1
Argentina	3	0
Canada	3	1
Japan	3	0
Belgium	2	1
China	2	0
Germany	2	1
Netherlands	1	1
Sweden	1	1
Turkey	1	0
Philippines	1	0

== Ceremony ==
Nominations for the 42nd International Emmy Awards were announced on October 13, 2014, by the International Academy of Television Arts & Sciences (IATAS) at a Press Conference at Mipcom in Cannes. There are 40 nominees across 10 categories, and for the first time, the International Academy is recognizing programs from the United States with a new category added to the 2014 International Emmys competition. Disputed the awards productions who enrolled between December 2013 and February 2014.

In addition to the presentation of the International Emmys for programming and performances, the International Academy presented two special awards. Mad Men creator, Matthew Weiner received the Founders Award and Roberto Irineu Marinho, CEO & President, Grupo Globo received the Directorate Award.

== Winners and nominees ==
Best Telenovela	Best Drama Series
Precious Pearl (Brazil) (Rede Globo); 30 vies (Canada) (Aetios Productions); Belmonte (Portugal) (TVI); My Husband's Lover (Philippines) (GMA Network)	Utopia (United Kingdom) (Canal+); Prófugos (Chile) (HBO Latin America); The Tunnel (United Kingdom) (Sky Atlantic/Canal+); Yae's Sakura (Japan) (NHK)
Best TV Movie or Miniseries	Best Arts Programming
Generation War (Germany) (ZDF); Alexandre e Outros Heróis (Brazil) (Rede Globo); An Adventure in Space and Time (United Kingdom) (BBC); Radio (Japan) (NHK)	The Exhibition (Canada) (Ladybird Films); El otro me importa (Argentina) (Encuentro); Picture Book: Touch, Feel, And Fragility (Japan) (WOWOW); The Wagner Files (Germany) (SWR)
Best Comedy Series	Best Documentary
Wat Als? (Belgium) (2BE); Please Like Me (Australia) (ABC); Late Nite News with Loyiso Gola (South Africa) (eNCA); A Mulher do Prefeito (Brazil) (Rede Globo)	No Burqas Behind Bars (Sweden) (SVT/NHK/NRK); De Volta (Brazil) (Canal Futura); No Fire Zone (United Kingdom) (Channel 4); Phantoms of the Border (South Korea) (TV Chosun)
Best Actor	Best Actress
Stephen Dillane in The Tunnel (United Kingdom) (Sky Atlantic/Canal+); Claude Legault in 19-2 (Canada) (Echo Media/Sphere Media); Pablo Rago in Televisión por la justicia (Argentina) (Canal 9); Wu Xiubo in The Orphan of Zhao (China) (CCTV)	Bianca Krijgsman in De Nieuwe Wereld (Netherlands) (Omroep NTR); Tuba Büyüküstün in 20 Dakika (Turkey) (Ay Yapım); Olivia Colman in Broadchurch (United Kingdom) (ITV); Romina Gaetani in Televisión por la Justicia (Argentina) (Canal 9)
Best Non-English Language U.S. Primetime Program	Best Non-Scripted Entertainment
El Señor de los Cielos (United States) (Telemundo); Pasión prohibida (United States) (Telemundo); La patrona (United States) (Telemundo); Temple de Acero (United States) (National Geographic Channel)	Educating Yorkshire (United Kingdom) (Channel 4); MasterChef (China) (Dragon Television); Missie Mosango (Belgium) (Geronimo); O Infiltrado (Brazil) (History Channel Latin America)
