= Filhos do Carnaval =

Television series

- Genre: Drama
- Created by: Cao Hamburger; Elena Soarez
- Written by: Cao Hamburger; Elena Soarez
- Country of origin: Brazil
- Original language: Portuguese
- No. of seasons: 2
- No. of episodes: 13

Production
- Running time: 42 minutes
- Production company: O2 Filmes

Original release
- Network: HBO Latin America
- Release: March 5, 2006 – 2006

Filhos do Carnaval (English: Sons of Carnival) is a Brazilian television series created by Cao Hamburger and Elena Soárez. Filmed in 2005 and aired in 2006, it eventually took a break after the actor who played the protagonist died. But later, it earned a new season, which aired in 2009.

== Cast ==
- Jece Valadão ... Anésio Gebara
- Felipe Camargo ... Anesinho
- Enrique Diaz ... Claudinho
- Rodrigo dos Santos ... Brown / Antônio Carlos
- Thogun ... Nilo
- Mariana Lima ... Ana Cristina
- Tiago Queiroz Herz ... Cris
- Jorge Coutinho ... Joel da Paixão
- Felipe Martins ... Órfão / Zé Júlio
- Felipe Wagner ... Sirio
- Roberta Rodrigues ... Rosana
- Maria Manoella ... Bárbara

== Episodes ==
Season 1

1. Gato, o bicho das sete vidas
2. Avestruz, o bicho que não quer ver
3. Vaca, o bicho que dá leite
4. Leão, o rei dos bichos
5. Abraço de urso
6. Elefante, o bicho que não esquece

Season 2

1. Arrivederci
2. Herança Paterna
3. Os Reis do Rio
4. Amigo Oculto
5. Vala Comum
6. Love Boat
7. O Legítimo

== Awards ==
| Year | Award | Category | Result |
|---|---|---|---|
| 2006 | 34th International Emmy Awards | Best TV movie or Miniseries | Nominated |
