= 34th International Emmy Awards =

2006 awards ceremony

- Date: November 20, 2006
- Location: New York Hilton Hotel; New York City, New York, U.S.
- Hosted by: Graham Norton

Highlights
- Founders Award: Steven Spielberg

The 34th International Emmy Awards took place on November 20, 2006, in New York City and hosted by Irish comedian Graham Norton. The award ceremony, presented by the International Academy of Television Arts and Sciences (IATAS), honors all programming produced and originally aired outside the United States.

== Ceremony ==
The nominees for the 34th International Emmy Awards were announced by the International Academy of Television Arts and Sciences (IATAS) on October 9, 2006, at a press conference at MIPCOM in Cannes, France.

United Kingdom received the most nominations, managing to place 17 out of 36 selected programs in all 9 categories. Followed by Brazil and Germany with five each. The nominees were selected over six months by a panel of 500 judges representing 35 countries.

Two special awards were presented by the International Academy, director Steven Spielberg was honored with the Founders' Award for his television career. The Directorate Award went to Ronald S. Lauder, founder and director of CME (Central European Media Enterprises), for his pioneering independent television broadcasting in Central and Eastern Europe. UNICEF Goodwill Ambassador Susan Sarandon presented an award for children's broadcasting, Ecaterina Telescu accepted the International Children's Day of Broadcasting (ICDB) Award on behalf of TeleRadio-Moldova. The other five nominees up for the honour came from Bangladesh, Colombia, Gambia, Spain, and Syria.

== Winners ==
Best Drama Series	Best TV Movie or Miniseries
Life on Mars (United Kingdom) (BBC); Little Missy (Brazil) (Rede Globo); Mandrake (Brazil) (HBO Latin America); Vincent (United Kingdom) (BBC)	Nuit noire 17 octobre 1961 (France) (Canal+); Sons of Carnival (Brazil) (HBO Latin America); The Crown Princess (Sweden) (STV); The Virgin Queen (United Kingdom) (BBC)
Best Documentary	Best Arts Programming
Hiroshima: BBC History of World War II (United Kingdom) (BBC); 9/11: The Falling Man (United Kingdom) (Channel 4); How Putin Came To Power (France) (Arte); The Search for Happiness (Germany) (WRD)	Knowledge is the Beginning (Germany) (ZDF); John Peel's Record Box (United Kingdom) (Channel 4); Soul Deep: The Story of Black Popular Music (United Kingdom) (BBC); I am Dali: Secrets of a Genius (Japan) (NHK)
Best Comedy Series	Best Non-Scripted Entertainment
Little Britain (United Kingdom) (BBC); Paare (Germany) (Sony Pictures Film/GmbH); Os Amadores (Brazil) (Rede Globo); The IT Crowd (United Kingdom) (Channel4)	Ramsay's Kitchen Nightmares (United Kingdom) (Channel 4); Big Brother Brasil 6 (Brazil) (Rede Globo); Supernanny (United Kingdom) (Channel 4); The Strict School of the Fifties (Germany) (ZDF)
Best Actor	Best Actress
Ray Winstone in Vincent (United Kingdom) (BBC); Bernard Farcy in Le Grand Charles (France) (France 2); Bernard Hill in A Very Social Secretary (United Kingdom) (Channel 4); Shen Lin in The Confession of Feng Qi (China) (CCTV)	Maryam Hassouni in Offers (Netherlands) (VARA); Lucy Cohu in The Queen's Sister (United Kingdom) (Channel 4); Heike Makatsch in Margarete Steiff (Germany) (SWR/GmbH); Imelda Staunton in My Family and Other Animals (United Kingdom) (BBC)
News	Current Affairs
BBC News: Lebanon Crisis (United Kingdom) (BBC); Bandila: The Subic Rape Case Promulgation (Philippines) (ABS-CBN); Jornal Nacional: Caravana JN – Elections (Brazil) (TV Globo); Pro TV News: Tibetans at the Chinese Border (Romania) (Pro TV)	Baghdad: A Doctor’s Story (United Kingdom) (Guardian Films for BBC Two); Hot Line: The Candelária Slaughter (Brazil) (TV Globo); La Liga: The Path of the Cocaine Leaf (Argentina) (Cuatro Cabezas S.A.); Special Reporter: Vyacheslav Grunskiy’s Studio – The Zone of Love (Russia) (Vyacheslav Grunskiy’s Studio for TV channel Russia)
Best Children & Young People Program	
Sugar Rush (United Kingdom) (Channel 4); Johnny and the Bomb (United Kingdom) (Childsplay Television); Elias: The Little Rescue Boat (Norway) (NRK); Gutta Boys (Norway) (NRK)

== Most major nominations ==
By country

- United Kingdom — 17
- Brazil — 5
- Germany — 5
- France — 3
- Norway — 2

By network

- BBC — 8
- Channel 4 — 7
- Rede Globo — 3
- GmbH — 2
- HBO Latin America — 2
- NRK — 2
- ZDF — 2

== Most major awards ==
By country

- United Kingdom — 6

By network

- BBC — 4
- Channel 4 — 2
