= The Drama of Dresden =

2005 television film

- Written by: Sebastian Dehnhardt
- Directed by: Sebastian Dehnhardt
- Music by: Enjott Schneider
- Country of origin: Germany

Production
- Producer: Leopold Hoesch
- Cinematography: Pawel Figurski; Johannes Imdahl; André Wawro (interviews)
- Editor: André Hammesfahr
- Running time: 90 minutes
- Production company: Broadview TV

Original release
- Release: 8 February 2005

The Drama of Dresden (German: Das Drama von Dresden) is a 2005 German television documentary film directed by Sebastian Dehnhardt about the bombing of the city of Dresden in 1945 during World War II.

== Awards ==
| Year | Award | Category | Result |
|---|---|---|---|
| 2005 | World Television Award | Best Documentary | Nominated |
| 2006 | 33rd International Emmy Awards | Best Documentary | Won |
| 2006 | Shanghai Television Festival | Best History & Biography Documentary | Won |
