= 47th International Emmy Awards =

2019 awards ceremony

- Promotional poster.
- Date: November 25, 2019
- Location: New York Hilton Midtown, New York City
- Hosted by: Ronny Chieng

Highlights
- Founders Award: David Benioff and D. B. Weiss
- Directorate Award: Christiane Amanpour

The 47th International Emmy Awards took place on November 25, 2019, at the New York Hilton Midtown in New York City. The award ceremony, presented by the International Academy of Television Arts and Sciences (IATAS), honors all TV programming produced and originally aired outside the United States and celebrated excellence in International television.

== Ceremony ==
Nominations for the 47th International Emmy Awards were announced on September 19, 2019, by the International Academy of Television Arts & Sciences (IATAS). There are 44 Nominees across 11 categories and 21 countries. Nominees come from: Argentina, Australia, Belgium, Brazil, Canada, Colombia, Finland, France, Germany, Hungary, India, Israel, the Netherlands, Portugal, Qatar, Singapore, South Africa, South Korea, Turkey, the United Kingdom and the United States.

In addition to the presentation of the International Emmys for programming and performances, the International Academy presented two special awards. Game of Thrones‘ creators and showrunners David Benioff and D. B. Weiss, received the Founders Award, and Christiane Amanpour, Chief International Anchor for CNN and host of PBS’ nightly global affairs show Amanpour, received the Directorate Award.

== Summary ==
Country	Nominations	Wins
Brazil	8	2
United Kingdom	6	2
United States	4	1
India	4	0
Netherlands	2	2
Australia	2	1
Hungary	2	1
Argentina	2	0
Germany	2	0
South Africa	2	0
Colombia	1	1
Turkey	1	1
Belgium	1	0
Canada	1	0
Finland	1	0
France	1	0
Israel	1	0
Portugal	1	0
Qatar	1	0
Singapore	1	0
South Korea	1	0

== Winners and nominees ==
Best Telenovela	Best Drama Series
La Reina del Flow (Colombia) (Sony Pictures Television/Teleset/Caracol TV); Cien días para enamorarse (Argentina) (Telefe/Underground); The River (South Africa) (Tshedza Pictures); Vidas Opostas (Portugal) (SP Televisão/SIC)	McMafia (United Kingdom) (Cuba Pictures); 1 Contra Todos (Brazil) (Fox Networks Group/Conspiração Filmes); Bad Banks (Germany) (Letterbox Filmproduktion GmbH/Iris Productions S.A./ZDF); Sacred Games (India) (Phantom Films/Netflix)
Best TV Movie or Miniseries	Best Arts Programming
Safe Harbour (Australia) (Matchbox Pictures); Se Eu Fechar os Olhos Agora (Brazil) (Rede Globo); Lust Stories (India) (Skywalk Films/Flying Unicorn Entertainment/RSVP/Netflix); Trezor (Hungary) (Szupermodern Studio)	Dance or Die (Netherlands) (A Witfilm/NTR); John and Yoko: Above Us Only Sky (United Kingdom) (Eagle Rock Films); Michel Legrand: Sans demi-mesure (France) (Cinétévé/Arte); Ópera Aberta: Os Pescadores de Pérolas (Brazil) (HBO Latin America/O2 Filmes)
Best Comedy Series	Best Documentary
The Last Hangover (Brazil) (Porta dos Fundos/Netflix); FAM! (Singapore) (Oak 3 Films Pte Ltd); Kupa Rashit (Israel) (July August Productions); Workin' Moms (Canada) (Wolf + Rabbit Entertainment/CBC)	Bellingcat: Truth in a Post-Truth World (Netherlands) (Submarine); A Primeira Pedra (Brazil) (Canal Futura/Couro de Rato); Louis Theroux's Altered States (United Kingdom) (BBC Studios); Witness: India's Forbidden Love (Qatar) (Al Jazeera English/Grain Media)
Best Actor	Best Actress
Haluk Bilginer in Şahsiyet (Turkey) (Ay Yapim); Christopher Eccleston in Come Home (United Kingdom) (BBC); Raphael Logam in Impuros (Brazil) (Fox Networks Group/Barry Company); Jannis Niewöhner in Beat (Germany) (Amazon Studios)	Marina Gera in Örök Tél (Hungary) (Szupermodern Studio); Radhika Apte in Lust Stories (India) (Skywalk Films/Netflix); Jenna Coleman in The Cry (United Kingdom) (Synchronicity Films/BBC One); Marjorie Estiano in Sob Pressão (Brazil) (Rede Globo/O2 Filmes)
Short-Form Series	Best Non-Scripted Entertainment
Hack The City (Brazil) (Fox Lab Brazil/Yourmama); dxyz (South Korea) (72Seconds); Luottomies (Finland) (Yle); Wrong Kind of Black (Australia) (Princess Pictures)	The Real Full Monty: Ladies' Night (United Kingdom) (Spun Gold TV); La Voz... Argentina (Argentina) (Telefe); Taboe (Belgium) (Panenka); The Remix (India) (Greymatter Entertainment Pvt. Ltd.)
Best Non-English Language U.S. Primetime Program
Falco (United States) (Spiral International/Red Arrow International/Dynamo); Al otro lado del muro (United States) (Telemundo Global Studios); El Recluso (United States) (Telemundo International Studios); Magnífica 70 (United States) (HBO Latin America/Conspiração Filmes)
