= 41st International Emmy Awards =

2013 awards ceremony

- Date: November 25, 2013
- Location: New York Hilton Midtown; New York City, New York, U.S.
- Hosted by: John Oliver

Highlights
- Founders Award: J. J. Abrams

The 41st International Emmy Awards took place on November 25, 2013, at the New York Hilton Midtown in New York City and hosted by British Comedian and actor John Oliver. The award ceremony, presented by the International Academy of Television Arts and Sciences (IATAS), honors all TV programming produced and originally aired outside the United States.

== Ceremony ==
Nominations for the 41st International Emmy Awards were announced on October 7, 2013, by the International Academy of Television Arts & Sciences (IATAS) at a Press Conference at Mipcom in Cannes. There are 36 nominees in 9 categories. Nominations span 19 countries: Angola, Australia, Belgium, Brazil, Canada, China, Colombia, France, Germany, Israel, Japan, Mexico, South Africa, South Korea, Sweden, New Zealand, the Philippines, the United Kingdom and Uruguay.

Brazil's TV Globo tied with the United Kingdom in the number of nominations, while Angola received his first appointment to the International Emmys in the telenovela category, for Windeck.

In addition to the presentation of the International Emmys for programming and performances, the International Academy presented two special awards. J. J. Abrams received the Founders Award and Anke Schäferkordt, Co-CEO of RTL Group and CEO of RTL Germany, received the Directorate Award.

=== Presenters ===
The following individuals, listed in order of appearance, presented awards.

Name(s)	Role
John Oliver	Host from 41st annual International Emmy Awards
Sarita Choudhury	Presenter of the award for Arts Programming
Taryn Manning; Jackie Cruz	Presenter of the award for Best Actor
Steve Guttenberg	Presenter of the award for Best Actress
Cathleen Rouleau; Anthony Kavanagh	Presenter of the award for Best Comedy Series
Kate Bolduan	Presenter of the award for Best Documentary
Michael K. Williams	Presenter of the award for Best Drama Series
Amanda Righetti; Cauã Reymond	Presenter of the award for Best Non-Scripted Entertainment
Jeffrey Tambor	Presenter of the award for Best Telenovela
Giancarlo Esposito; Jim Caviezel	Presenter of the award for Best TV movie or Mini-Series
Zachary Quinto	Presenters of the award for Emmy Founders Award
Wladimir Klitschko	Presenters of the award for Emmy Directorate Award

== Winners and nominees ==
Best Telenovela	Best Drama Series
Side by Side (Brazil) (Rede Globo); Brazil Avenue (Brazil) (Rede Globo); Windeck (Angola) (Semba Comunicação); 30 vies (Canada) (Aetios Productions)	The Returned (France) (Canal+); Maalaala Mo Kaya (Philippines) (ABS-CBN); Next in Line (Brazil) (Rede Globo); Accused (United Kingdom) (BBC)
Best TV Movie or Miniseries	Best Arts Programming
A Day for a Miracle (Germany) (ZDF); Somos (Uruguay) (Canal 10); Secret State (United Kingdom) (Channel 4); Heaven's Ark (Japan) (WOWOW)	Hello?! Orchestra (South Korea) (MBC); Freddie Mercury: The Great Pretender (United Kingdom) (BBC); Soundtrack (Belgium) (Geronimo BVBA); Miradas Múltiples (La máquina loca) (Mexico) (Teveunam)
Best Comedy Series	Best Documentary
Moone Boy (United Kingdom) (Sky 1); WorkinGirls (France) (Canal Plus); Late Nite News with Loyiso Gola (South Africa) (eNCA); How to Enjoy the End of the World (Brazil) (Rede Globo)	5 Broken Cameras (France) (France Télévisions); The Golden Hour (New Zealand) (TVNZ); My Mother, Lady Bondong (South Korea) (MBC); 5 de mayo: Un día de gloria (Mexico) (Discovery Latin America)
Best Actor	Best Actress
Sean Bean in Accused (United Kingdom) (BBC); Marcos Palmeira in Mandrake (Brazil) (HBO Latin America); Heino Ferch in Anatomy of Revenge (Germany) (ZDF); Shinichi Tsutsumi in Yasu - A Single Father's Story (Japan) (NHK)	Fernanda Montenegro in Sweet Mother (Brazil) (Rede Globo/Casa de Cinema de Porto Alegre); Sheridan Smith in Mrs Biggs (United Kingdom) (ITV); Lotta Tejle in 30 Degrees in February (Sweden) (SVT); Sun Li in Empresses in the Palace (China) (Beijing TV Art Center)
Best Non-Scripted Entertainment
Go Back to Where You Came From (Australia) (SBS); MasterChef (South Africa) (M-Net); Reto al Chef (Colombia) (Fox Telecolombia); Dear Neighbours Help Our Daughter Find Love (Israel) (Keshet)
