= Life with Murder =

- Film poster
- Directed by: John Kastner
- Country of origin: Canada
- Original language: English

Production
- Producers: Silva Basmajain; John Kastner; Deborah Parks
- Cinematography: Mark Caswell; John Westheuser
- Editor: Greg West
- Running time: 94 minutes
- Production company: National Film Board of Canada

Original release
- Network: CTV Television Network
- Release: August 31, 2010

Life with Murder is a 2010 Canadian documentary film, directed by John Kastner. The film profiles Brian and Leslie Jenkins, a couple in Chatham, Ontario Canada who are struggling to cope and heal after their son Mason was convicted of murdering their daughter Jennifer.

The film premiered at the Hot Docs Canadian International Documentary Festival on May 1, 2010, and was distributed primarily as a television film which aired on CTV Television Network on August 31, 2010.

The film won the Donald Brittain Award for Best Social/Political Documentary Program at the 26th Gemini Awards, and the International Emmy Award for Best Documentary at the 39th International Emmy Awards.
