= Richard Dunn (television executive) =

British television executive

Richard Johann Dunn (5 September 1943 – 4 August 1998) was a British television executive who served as the Chief Executive Officer of Thames Television. Having joined Thames in 1978, he became director of production in 1981, before being promoted to chief executive in 1985. Under Dunn's leadership, Thames became a publicly traded company in 1988. Following the loss of Thames' ITV franchise in 1991, he established the company as the largest independent producer in Britain, launching UK Gold and making an unsuccessful bid for the Channel 5 licence. He left Thames in 1995. He died suddenly in 1998 at the age of 54. He was married with three children, and was half-Icelandic.

He won an International Emmy Founders Award in 1993. Following his death, the Richard Dunn Memorial Lecture and Interview at the Edinburgh International TV Festival was established in his honour.
