= Smiling in a War Zone =

Smiling in a War Zone / Flying Down to Kabul
- Directed by: Simone Aaberg Kærn
- Cinematography: Magnus Bejmar
- Release date: 14 September 2006
- Running time: 78 minutes
- Countries: Denmark, Turkey, Afghanistan
- Languages: Danish, English

Smiling in a War Zone, also known as Flying Down to Kabul, is a partly documentary film by artist Simone Aaberg Kærn about flying from Denmark to Afghanistan to help a young Afghani girl becoming a pilot. It was filmed in 2002 and released on 14 September 2006.

== Background ==
Kærn sees airspace as an expression of individual freedom, void of political borders. In 1999, Kærn made a film about Women Airforce Service Pilots (WASP) called Sisters in the sky. Inspired by the WASPs, Kærn obtained a flying license.

== Flying to Kabul ==
External media

Images
- Seize the Sky

Video
- Official trailer video

After the September 11 attacks, airspace became restricted, and allied forces deposed the Taliban regime.

In January 2002, Kærn sat in a café in Copenhagen and read a newspaper article about Farial, (16-year-old girl in Kabul) wanting to fly airplanes. Kærn decided to fly with partner Magnus Bejmar 6,000 km to Kabul and give the girl the experience of flight, and also reclaim the freedom of the skies.

With money from WASP paintings in Louisiana Museum of Modern Art, she bought a Piper Colt from 1961, a small airplane.

During a 3-month trip through flight-restricted Balkan, they met with female fighter pilots in Turkey and talked about the world's first female fighter pilot Sabiha Gökçen, and made an aerial heart of smoke with the Turkish Air Force.

On day 77, they flew from Mashhad, Iran crossing the border, to Herat without authorization from NATO.

In Kabul, they met with Farial who got to fly the plane. They also met with two colonel sister pilots flying Mil Mi-17 helicopters. In the end, cultural differences prevented Farial going further.

The film won the "Full Frame Women in Leadership Award" in 2006.
