= John Hendricks =

American businessman (born 1952)

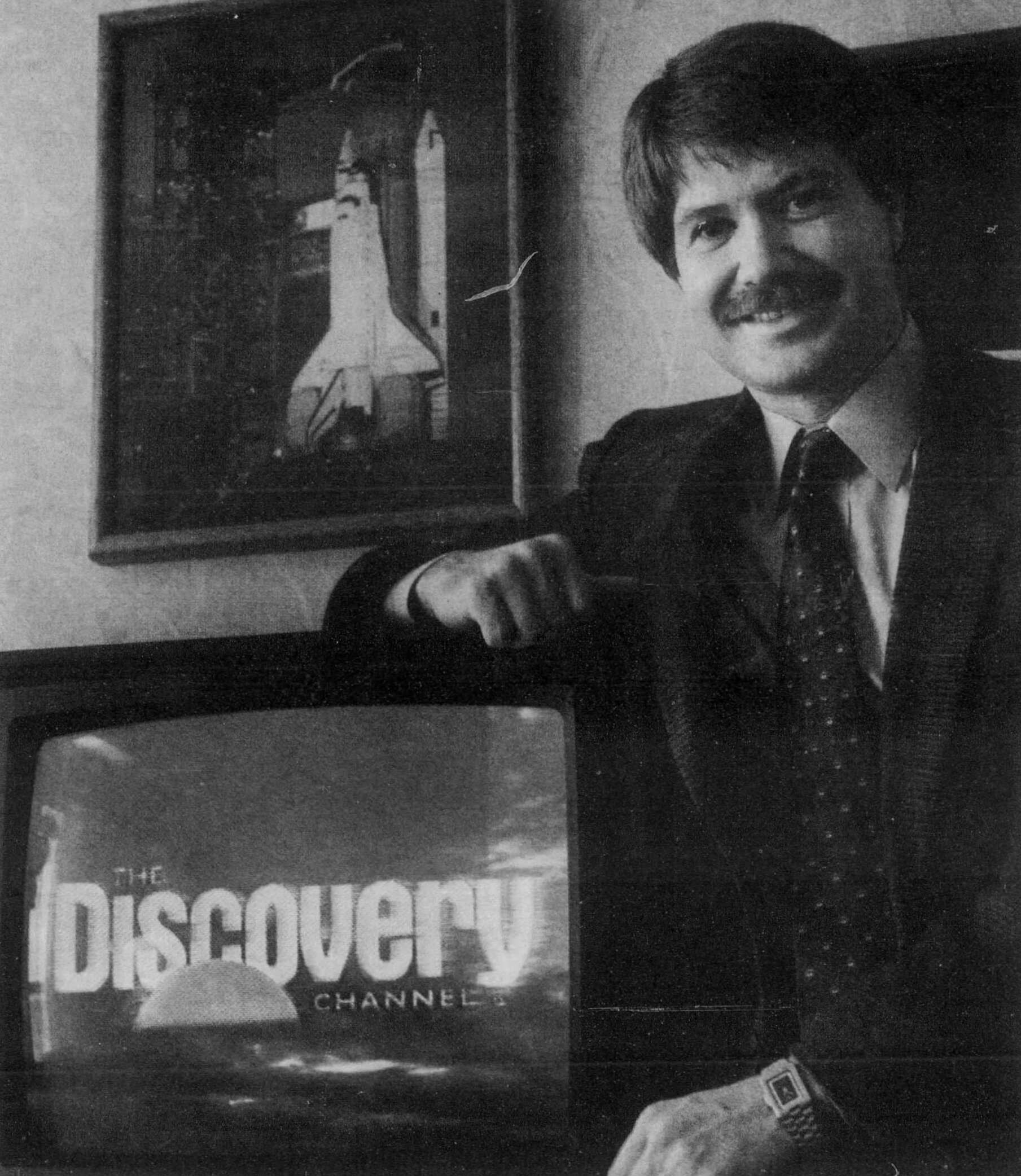
- Hendricks in 1988
- Born: John Samuel Hendricks; March 29, 1952 (age 74); Matewan, West Virginia, U.S.
- Occupation: Businessman
- Years active: 1975–present
- Known for: Founder of Discovery Communications and CuriosityStream
- Spouse: Maureen Donohue (m. 1981)
- Children: 2
- Awards: International Emmy Founders Award (2000)

John Samuel Hendricks (born March 29, 1952) is an American businessman and the founder and former chairman of Discovery, Inc. (later Warner Bros. Discovery), a broadcasting and film production company which owned the Discovery Channel, TLC, and Animal Planet networks, among other ventures. On March 20, 2014, after 32 years at the helm, he made public his intention to retire as chairman of Discovery Communications after the annual shareholders' meeting of May 16, 2014. He moved on to found Curiosity Stream, an ad-free, on-demand streaming service.

== Early life ==
Born in Matewan, West Virginia, Hendricks' father was a home builder and his mother a clerk for city government. In 1958, the Hendricks family moved to Huntsville, Alabama, where Hendricks grew up. His father died when he was 20, and his mother died when he was 30. He attended S. R. Butler High School where he met his first wife, Pattie Miller. Hendricks graduated from the University of Alabama in Huntsville, and he received his bachelor's degree in history in 1974. While a student at UAH he worked in the audio visual department where he had the idea to bring documentaries to the public.

He was hired as director of community and government relations for the University of Alabama in Huntsville the year he graduated, and became director of corporate and foundation relations for the University of Maryland in 1975. While at the University of Maryland, he co-founded a fund-raising consulting company, the American Association of University Consultants, with Edward M. Peabody, and published several newsletters aimed at academic disciplines such as chemistry.

== Commercial ventures ==
John Hendricks founded the Cable Educational Network, Inc., in Bethesda, Maryland, in 1982 to provide documentary programming to cable broadcasters. On June 17, 1985, Hendricks launched the Discovery Channel with $5 million in start-up capital led by the American investment firm Allen & Company. Today, Discovery's main shareholders include John C. Malone, chairman of Liberty Media, and Advance/Newhouse (publishers of Vanity Fair, New Yorker, and Vogue).

Hendricks helped found the Women's United Soccer Association in 1999. After operating for three seasons, WUSA ceased operations in 2003. In 2004, Hendricks and a group of investors attempted a financial rescue of the league to revive professional women's soccer in the United States. In April 2007, the WUSA announced a revival of the league, to occur in 2008. The new league, Women's Professional Soccer (WPS), ran March 2009 to January 2012.

In 2013, Harper Collins published his first business memoir, A Curious Discovery: An Entrepreneur's Story. His biography recounts the struggles and triumphs of turning his passion for documentary programs into the world's most widely distributed cable channel and parlaying its popularity into a leading global media company.

In 2015, Hendricks founded CuriosityStream, an online video on demand service. CuriosityStream provides documentaries and series about science, technology, history and nature.

== Family ==
John Hendricks married his current wife, Maureen Donohue, on January 10, 1981. John and Maureen have two children, Elizabeth (Hendricks) Saravia and Andrew Hendricks. Elizabeth attended the Holton-Arms School and Princeton University, was chief executive officer of CuriosityStream from 2013 to 2018 and cis President of Hendricks Factual Media. Andrew attended the Landon School, and is president of Driven Experiences, a racing and automotive company invested in many forms of the marketing media. Andrew is also a professional sports car driver in Grand-Am Road Racing.

== Charitable activity ==
In 1995, Hendricks was appointed to the Lowell Observatory Advisory Board. In 2004, Hendricks donated $1 million to the Observatory for the construction of the Lowell Discovery Telescope. In 2007, Hendricks donated an additional $5 million to the Observatory to complete the telescope. The Planetary Research Center at the Observatory was renamed the Hendricks Center for Planetary Studies shortly thereafter in honor of the donation.

Hendricks is on the Board of Directors of a number of non-profit organizations including United States Olympic & Paralympic Committee, Carnegie Corporation of New York, Institute for Advanced Study, National Forest Foundation, and Discovery Learning Alliance.

Hendricks has organized two charitable foundations. The John and Maureen Hendricks Charitable Foundation was established in 2001. It receives donations from the Hendricks family (roughly $1.1 million in 2005–2006, according to the foundation's Form 900 tax statement) and disburses grants to charitable causes. In total gifting, the Hendricks have donated over $30 million to numerous non-profit organizations supporting a wide variety of causes, from basic social services to science research. The John S. Hendricks Family Foundation was established in 1997. The foundation is used for specialized charitable purposes by the Hendricks family, and had no income, assets or disbursements in calendar years 2003, 2004 or 2005 (according to the foundation's Form 900 tax statements).

== Honors ==
- 6066 Hendricks asteroid named after him.
- In 2011, Hendricks was honored with an Edison Achievement Award for his commitment to innovation throughout his career.
- In 1997, he received the Golden Plate Award of the American Academy of Achievement.
