= Planeta Extremo =

Brazilian TV program

- Genre: Documentary
- Written by: Clayton Conservani; Carol Barcellos
- Directed by: João Pedro Paes Leme
- Country of origin: Brazil
- Original language: Portuguese
- No. of seasons: 1

Production
- Cinematography: Ari Jr; Ulisses Mendes; Fabio Brandão
- Editors: Marcelo Outeiral; Fellipe Awi
- Camera setup: Multiple-camera setup

Original release
- Network: Rede Globo
- Release: 25 January – 29 March 2015

Planeta Extremo (English: Extreme Planet) is a Brazilian television program. It was produced and aired by Rede Globo.

== Synopsis ==
A team of Brazilian journalists travel across four continents and face challenges and danger, yet encounter beauty and success.
