= George Orwell: A Life in Pictures =

- Genre: Docudrama
- Written by: Chris Durlacher; Paul Whittington
- Directed by: Chris Durlacher
- Starring: Chris Langham; Michael Fenton Stevens; Tom Goodman-Hill
- Narrated by: Barbara Flynn
- Composer: Daniel Pemberton
- Country of origin: United Kingdom
- Original language: English

Production
- Executive producers: Jacquie Hughes; Adam Kemp; Emma Willis
- Producer: Chris Durlacher
- Running time: 90 minutes

Original release
- Network: BBC Two
- Release: 14 June 2003

Related
- Agatha Christie: A Life in Pictures; Elizabeth David: A Life in Recipes; H. G. Wells: War with the World

George Orwell: A Life in Pictures is a 2003 BBC Television docudrama telling the life story of the British author George Orwell. Chris Langham plays the part of Orwell. No surviving sound recordings or video of the real George Orwell have been found.

== Awards ==
- International Academy of Television Arts and Sciences 2004
  - International Emmy for Best Arts Programme
- Grierson Awards 2004
  - Grierson Award for Best Documentary on the Arts
