= HBO Brasil =

Brazilian pay television channel

HBO (Brazil)
- Country: Brazil
- Headquarters: Coral Gables, Florida; São Paulo, Brazil

Programming
- Picture format: 1080i HDTV

Ownership
- Owner: Warner Bros. Discovery Latin America
- Sister channels: Cinemax (1997–2010 as a premium channel, 2009- as an ad-supported basic channel); Max (2010–2020, replacing Cinemax's premium incarnation)

History
- Launched: July 1, 1991; 35 years ago

Links
- Website: hbobrasil.com

HBO Brazil is the Brazilian version of HBO, a pay TV channel dedicated to feature films, series and other special content since 1994. As with its American counterpart, HBO Brazil has premium characteristics, and invests in original programming. It is also the flagship network on HBO Max, the channel package offered by its programmer, HBO Latin America Group, along with the movie-oriented Max channel.

== History ==
The first signs of a Latin American expansion of HBO came with the debut of Selecciones in 1989, a Spanish-language track available during part of HBO's programming in the US. Up to the end of 1991, HBO already had a channel operating in Latin America, although not in Portuguese. The group's initial operations in the region happened with a partnership between Time Warner with Venezuelan-owned Omnivisión Latin Entertainment (OLE), forming HBO Olé Partners in that year. Currently known as HBO Latin America Group, the company still maintains HBO and several other licensed channels. Afterwards, Sony Pictures joined, guaranteeing exclusivity on Columbia and TriStar Pictures releases.

Soon after the launch of the Latin American initiative, HBO Olé was seeking a partner for its Brazilian arrival. Two large media groups in Brazil, Organizações Globo (Globosat and NET) and Grupo Abril (TVA), were also looking for partnerships with major studios in order to acquire content for their movie channels. HBO was considered by Globo, but the deal never went forward because it'd guarantee only Warner Bros. at the time. The definitive choice was Grupo Abril, which was starting TVA, its cable provider, to join as a minor shareholder. HBO Brazil went on the air on July 1, 1994. HBO also established itself as a programmer of other networks in Brazil. Its first foray was on basic cable, with Sony Entertainment Television. Later, as years passed, more channels and partnerships were accomplished by HBO Olé Partners. On TVA, HBO Brazil replaced movie channel Showtime (not related to the American premium network). Abril also assured that HBO was distributed exclusively through TVA. Around the same time, Telecine, from Globosat, was establishing its operations in the country with 20th Century Fox, Paramount, MGM and Universal Pictures.

In December 1994, HBO Brazil had its first experimental 3D broadcasts, distributing anaglyph glasses for subscribers and offering additional pairs for one real each. Three-dimensional programming consisted of short movies between regular programs. The network was also the first to adopt multiplexing in Brazil by offering HBO2, with the original channel programming tape-delayed by 6 hours, in March 1995. 1996 marked the arrival of DirecTV Brazil, to be one of its most important partners: by the end of 1999, a 5-year satellite exclusivity contract was signed between HBO Brazil and DirecTV, estimated at $250 million.

In 1997, another studio joined the network: Walt Disney Studios. That same year, Cinemax, available in the rest of Latin America since 1994, launches in Brazil, totalling 3 premium channels offered. In July 2000, Grupo Abril sold its 25% stake back to Time Warner, valued at around $43 million. In October, now being run directly from abroad, another channel was added: Cinemax Prime – this time earlier than the rest of Latin America, which had HBO Plus. Other than new networks, Abril's withdrawal made programming to be determined directly by HBO Latin America Group headquarters in Coral Gables, Florida, leaving only a sales and marketing office in São Paulo, Brazil.

The package that had HBO Brazil was finally consolidated on December 18, 2003, when HBO Plus and HBO Family became available in Brazil, initially only through DirecTV. With this, it now had five channels: HBO, HBO Family, HBO Plus, Cinemax, and Cinemax Prime, each accompanied by its time-shifted companion (HBO2 among them), totalling 10 channels. On March 16, 2005, HBO Brazil, along with the HBO Max package, finally arrived to other cable providers with the inclusion of its networks on NET, the largest pay TV operator in Brazil. On satellite, SKY Brasil, acquired by DirecTV, ended up getting the channels when both companies merged in 2006. Now, with both exclusivity contracts ended, HBO Brazil was free for negotiation with other providers. However, both NET and Sky conditioned the availability of HBO to the mandatory subscription of rival Telecine channels, and the situation remained that way until December 2009. Its HD simulcast debuted in Brazil on October 1, 2008, through TVA.

In 2010, HBO on Demand was announced for Brazil, initially through a partnership with NET, offering content on demand for the channel's subscribers. March 2010 also represented the departure of Sony Pictures as a shareholder and partner of HBO Latin America Group, accompanied by Disney. The group remains only with Time Warner (Home Box Office, Inc.) and OLE.

August 2011 came with a loss for HBO, no longer with Walt Disney Studios' catalog in Brazil. Other Latin American countries will remain with Disney's content. The Brazilian transition will occur for two more years – meanwhile, the back catalog will stay with HBO, but the premium window will be exclusive to Telecine, starting in October 2011. The announcement came amidst controversies: Telecine claims to now have over 70% of premieres (Disney included), an argument refuted by HBO, which, in turn, says it has over 50% of top-grossing movies. The main issue, however, is that HBO announced that it spontaneously broke up the agreement with Disney to "open space for new Brazilian productions," also contradicting Disney's Latin America VP Fernando Barbosa's statement that it was a financial issue, Telecine being "more watched and, thus, more profitable." Globosat's general manager, Alberto Pecegueiro, was also quoted as saying that his company maintains good relations with most programmers, with the exception of HBO, which he considers "thugs." HBO did not respond.

== HBO-branded channels in Brazil ==
- HBO: The flagship channel, featuring recent feature film releases, original HBO content (series, films, music specials and Brazilian-produced series) and acquired series.
- HBO2: Content from the flagship channel, dubbed in Portuguese and at alternate times.
- HBO Plus: Aimed at young adults, features feature films, original HBO series (some of them exclusive to this channel) and comedy specials, as well as some boxing events.
- HBO Family: Features family films and series.
- HBO Signature: Dedicated to HBO's original content, especially their series, films, comedy and music specials, as well as Real Time with Bill Maher, in a live simulcast with HBO U.S. The channel also features some feature films and acquired series.

As of 2020, the Max channels were absorbed by the HBO brand, so as not to confuse viewers in a future launch of the HBO Max streaming service in the region. The channels Max, Max Prime and Max Up have become:

- HBO Mundi, formerly Max. Dedicated to international alternative cinema.
- HBO Xtreme, formerly Max Prime. Dedicated to action movies, also has exclusive series.
- HBO Pop, formerly Max Up. Dedicated to comedy and pop-oriented movies.

== Bibliography ==
- Abbas, M. Ackbar; Erni, John Nguyet (2005). Internationalizing cultural studies (an anthology). Malden: Wiley-Blackwell. p. 685. ISBN 9780631236238.
- Possebon, Samuel (2009). TV por assinatura (20 anos de evolução) (in Portuguese). São Paulo: ABTA. p. 272. ISBN 978-85-909664-0-1.
- Ramos, Murilo César (2000). Às margens da estrada do futuro (comunicações, políticas e tecnologia) (in Portuguese). Brasília: FAC/Editorial Eletrônica. p. 195.
- Sinclair, John (1999). Latin American television (a global view). Oxford: Oxford University Press. p. 187. ISBN 0-19-815929-3.
