= Nuit noire 17 octobre 1961 =

- Written by: Stéphane Giusti
- Directed by: Alain Tasma
- Music by: Cyril Morin
- Country of origin: France
- Original language: French

Production
- Producers: Thomas Anargyros; Edouard de Vésinne; Bertrand Meheut; Olivier Rousselle
- Cinematography: Roger Dorieux
- Editor: Marie-Sophie Dubus
- Running time: 120 minutes

Original release
- Network: Canal+
- Release: 2005

Nuit noire 17 octobre 1961 is a 2005 French television film directed by Alain Tasma.

This is the adaptation of the investigative book "La Bataille de Paris" by Jean-Luc Einaudi (Le Seuil, 1991) and the extensive research conducted by historians on the actual events of the massacre on October 17, 1961, following a deadly repression by the French police during a demonstration organized by the French Federation of the FLN in Paris.

== Cast ==
- Clotilde Courau ... Sabine
- Florence Thomassin ... Nathalie
- Vahina Giocante ... Marie-Hélène
- Atmen Kelif ... Tarek
- Jalil Naciri ... Maurice
- Thierry Fortineau ... Papon
- Aurélien Recoing ... Somveille
- Serge Riaboukine ... Brigadeiro Tiercé
- Jean-Michel Portal ... Martin
- Jean-Michel Fête ... Bertaut
- Philippe Bas ... Delmas

== Awards ==
| Year | Award | Category | Nominated | Result |
|---|---|---|---|---|
| 2006 | 34th International Emmy Awards | Best TV Movies/Miniseries | Nuit noire 17 octobre 1961 | Won |
