= International Emmy Founders Award =

- Country: United States
- Presented by: International Academy of Television Arts and Sciences
- First award: 1980
- Website: www.iemmys.tv

The International Emmy Founders Award (or Founders Award) is given by the International Academy of Television Arts and Sciences (IATAS) to individuals whose creative accomplishments have contributed in some way to the quality of global television production. The awards ceremony has taken place in New York City since 1980.

== Winners ==
| Year | Winner | Country | Note |
|---|---|---|---|
| 1980 | Jim Henson | United States | Creator of The Muppets |
| 1981 | Shaun Sutton | United Kingdom | Head of BBC-TV's Drama Group |
| 1981 | Roone Arledge | United States | Executive producer, ABC's Wide World of Sports |
| 1982 | Michael Landon | United States | Executive producer, director, writer and performer |
| 1983 | Herbert Brodkin | United States | Producer, co-founder of Titus Productions |
| 1984 | David L. Wolper | United States | Producer and television executive |
| 1985 | David Attenborough | United Kingdom | Creator, writer, producer and TV host |
| 1986 | Donald L. Taffner | United Kingdom | President, D.L. Taffner Ltd |
| 1987 | Jacques-Yves Cousteau | France | President, Cousteau Society |
| 1988 | Goar Mestre | Argentina | Latin American Broadcasting Pioneer |
| 1989 | Paul Fox | United Kingdom | Managing director, BBC Television |
| 1990 | Joan Ganz Cooney | United States | American television producer |
| 1991 | Adrian Cowell | United Kingdom | Film Maker, ITV Central |
| 1992 | Bill Cosby | United States | (Comedian, actor and producer |
| 1993 | Richard Dunn | United Kingdom | CEO, Thames Television |
| 1994 | Film on Four: Channel 4 | United Kingdom | British public-service television broadcaster |
| 1995 | Don Hewitt | United States | Executive producer, CBS' 60 Minutes |
| 1996 | Reg Grundy | Australia | Founder, Grundy Productions |
| 1997 | Jac Venza | United States | Director of Cultural & Arts Programs, WNET |
| 1998 | Robert Halmi Sr. | Hungary | Chairman, RHI Entertainment |
| 1999 | Hisashi Hieda | Japan | President, Fuji Television |
| 2000 | John Hendricks | United States | Founder and CEO, Discovery Communications |
| 2001 | Pierre Lescure | France | Chairman and CEO of Canal+ Group |
| 2002 | Sir Howard Stringer | United Kingdom | Chairman and CEO, Sony Corporation of America |
| 2003 | HBO | United States | American premium cable and satellite television network |
| 2004 | MTV International | United States | Channel subsidiary of MTV Networks |
| 2005 | Oprah Winfrey | United States | Chairman, Harpo Inc. |
| 2006 | Steven Spielberg | United States | American film director |
| 2007 | Al Gore | United States | Chairman, Current TV |
| 2008 | Dick Wolf | United States | Creator and executive producer, Law & Order |
| 2009 | David Frost | United Kingdom | Journalist and producer |
| 2010 | Simon Cowell | United Kingdom | Founder, SYCO |
| 2011 | Nigel Lythgoe | United Kingdom | Executive producer, So You Think You Can Dance; American Idol |
| 2012 | Ryan Murphy | United States | Showrunner |
| 2012 | Norman Lear | United States | 40th Anniversary Special Founders Award |
| 2012 | Alan Alda | United States | 40th Anniversary Special Founders Award |
| 2013 | J. J. Abrams | United States | Film director |
| 2014 | Matthew Weiner | United States | Screenwriter, Creator of the series Mad Men |
| 2015 | Julian Fellowes | United Kingdom | Screenwriter, Creator of the series Downton Abbey |
| 2016 | Shonda Rhimes | United States | Television producer, writer and author |
| 2017 | None (Note: Actor and producer Kevin Spacey was announced as the recipient, but this was rescinded following allegations of sexual misconduct prior to being awarded.) | None | None |
| 2018 | Greg Berlanti | United States | American film and television writer and producer |
| 2019 | David Benioff and D. B. Weiss | United States | Game of Thrones showrunners |
| 2020 | Andrew Cuomo (rescinded) | United States | 56th Governor of New York |
| 2021 | None | None | None |
| 2022 | Ava DuVernay | United States | Filmmaker |
| 2023 | Jesse Armstrong | United Kingdom | Screenwriter and producer |
| 2024 | David E. Kelley | United States | Television writer, producer |
| 2025 | Dana Walden | United States | Co-chairman of Disney Entertainment |

== Rescinded awards ==
=== Kevin Spacey (2017) ===
Actor and producer Kevin Spacey was chosen to be the recipient of the award for 2017, but the International Academy of Television Arts and Sciences later tweeted a reversal of their decision, following accusations of sexual misconduct by Spacey in 1986 towards a then-14-year-old Anthony Rapp.

=== Andrew Cuomo (2020) ===
Andrew Cuomo, who was the Governor of New York at the time, received the award during the 2020 ceremony for his daily briefings during the early stages of the COVID-19 pandemic, which the International Academy said "effectively created television shows, with characters, plot lines, and stories of success and failure". However, shortly after Cuomo's resignation on August 24, 2021, following a report by the state attorney general into allegations of sexual harassment, the academy rescinded his award.
