= International Emmy Award for Best Non-English Language U.S. Primetime Program =

Television award category

- Country: United States
- Presented by: International Academy of Television Arts and Sciences
- First award: 2014
- Currently held by: Buscando a Frida (2022)
- Website: www.iemmys.tv

The International Emmy Award for Best Non-English Language U.S. Primetime Program is presented by the International Academy of Television Arts & Sciences (IATAS) to the best primetime programs in a language other than English produced and initially aired in the United States.

== Rules and regulations ==
Under the rules of the International Academy of Television Arts and Sciences (IATAS), programs produced and broadcast in the United States, and originally created for television, are eligible. Productions must initially be broadcast in the country between January 1 and December 31 of the previous year. Programs with a simulcast within the US may choose to enter this category or compete in the general categories of the International Emmy. Also, not have been submitted in any other Emmy competition (including any U.S. competition); not even released in theaters, inside or outside the US, before the first television broadcast.

== Winners and nominees ==
=== 2010s ===
Year	English title	Production company/Network
2014	El Señor de los Cielos	Telemundo Internacional
2014	La Patrona	Telemundo Internacional
2014	Pasión Prohibida	Telemundo Studios / Telemundo Internacional
2014	Temple de Acero	Rock and Roll Films US / National Geographic Channel
2015	Arrepentidos (Episode: "El Infierno de Montoya")	Nat Geo Mundo / Fox Telecolombia
2015	El Mejor de los Peores	Fox International Channels / Fox Toma 1
2015	Narco Tec	Mazdoc / Zodiak Latino / Univision
2015	La Voz Kids	Talpa Media USA, Inc. / Warner Horizon Television
2016	Francisco, El Jesuita	Anima Films / The History Channel Latin America / Telemundo / Claro Video / DirecTV
2016	Asombrosamente	Fox Networks Group Latin America / Nat Geo Mundo / National Geographic Channels Latin America / Nativa Productions
2016	La Banda	FremantleMedia Latin America / Syco / Univision / Saban
2016	Un viaje con Fidel	CNN en Español
2017	Sr. Ávila	HBO Latin America / Lemon Films
2017	Hasta que te conocí	Disney Media Distribution / Somos Producciones / IGSFA Management LLC / BTF Media
2017	La Voz Kids	Talpa Media USA, Inc. / Warner Horizon Television
2017	Odisea de los Niños Migrantes	Nat Geo Mundo / Fox Networks Group Latin America / National Geographic Channel Latin America / Anima Films
2018	El Vato (Season 2)	Universo / Endemol Shine Boomdog
2018	El Señor de los Cielos (Season 5)	Telemundo Studios / Argos Televisión
2018	Jenni Rivera, Mariposa de Barrio	Telemundo Studios
2018	Sin Senos Sí Hay Paraíso (Season 2)	Telemundo Studios / FoxTelecolombia
2019	Falco	Spiral International / Red Arrow Studios International / Dynamo
2019	Al otro lado del muro	Telemundo Global Studios
2019	El Recluso	Telemundo International Studios
2019	Magnifica 70	HBO Brazil / Conspiração Filmes

=== 2020s ===
Year	English title	Production company/Network
2020	2019 Latin Grammy Awards	Univision / The Latin Recording Academy
2020	La Reina del Sur	Telemundo Global Studios / Netflix / AG Studios Colombia / Diagonal TV / Argos
2020	You Cannot Hide	Telemundo Global Studios / Netflix
2020	Preso No. 1	Telemundo Global Studios / Keshet
2021	2020 Latin Grammy Awards	Univision / The Latin Recording Academy
2021	A Tiny Audience	A Tiny Audience, LLC
2021	COVID 19: Adaptarnos o Morir	WAPA-TV
2021	Premio Lo Nuestro 2020	Univision
2022	Buscando a Frida	Telemundo Global Studios / Argos Comunicación
2022	2021 Latin American Music Awards	NBCUniversal Telemundo Enterprises / Somos Productions
2022	La suerte de Loli	Telemundo Global Studios
2022	Malverde: El Santo Patrón	Telemundo Global Studios / Equipment and Film Design
