= International Emmy Award for Best Actor =

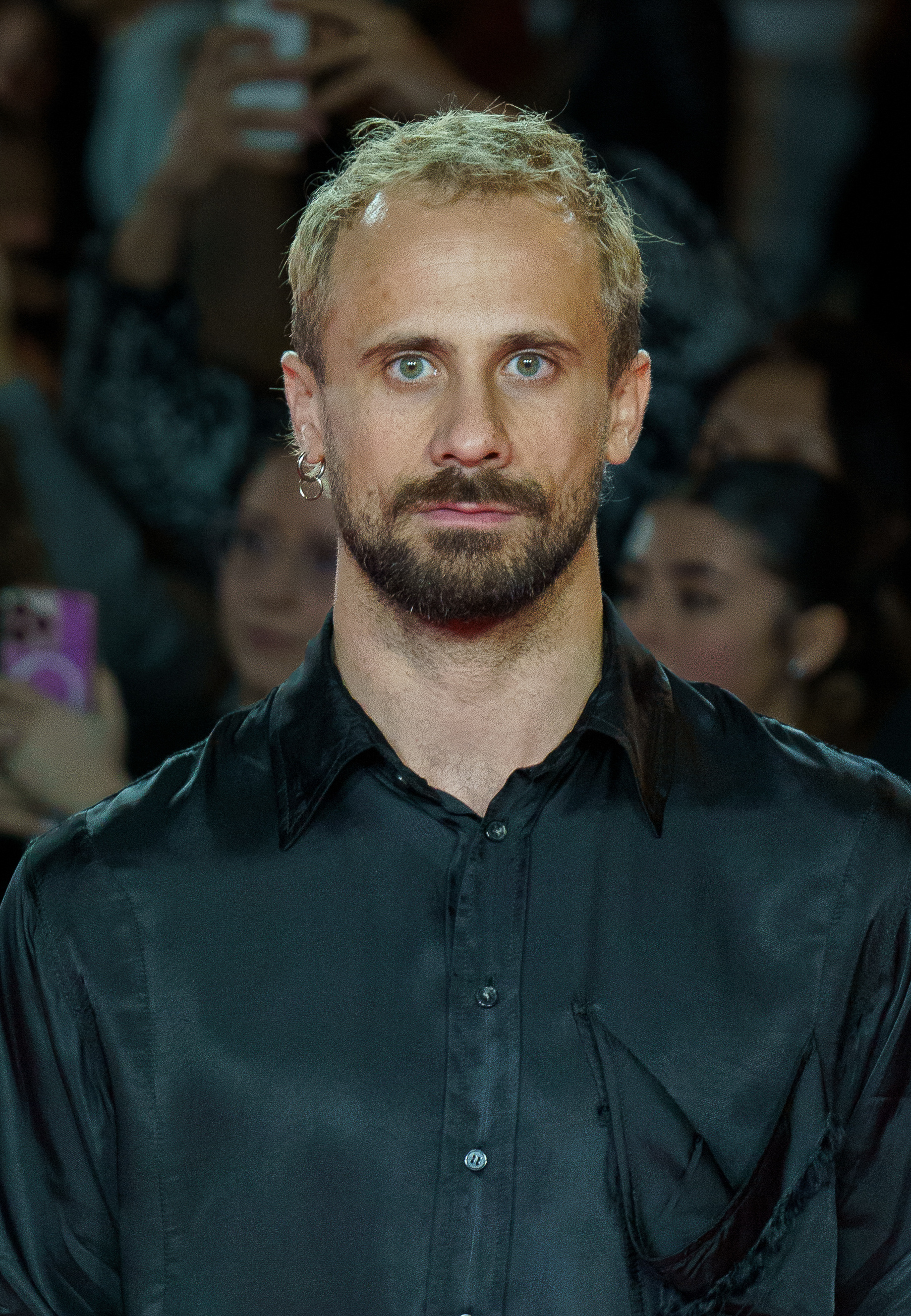
- 2025 recipient Oriol Pla
- Awarded for: Best Performance by an Actor
- Country: United States
- Presented by: International Academy of Television Arts and Sciences
- First award: 2005
- Currently held by: Oriol Pla, I, Addict (2025)
- Website: www.iemmys.tv

The International Emmy Award for Best Performance by an Actor is presented by the International Academy of Television Arts & Sciences (IATAS). It honors outstanding male performances in programs originally created for television and initially produced and aired outside the United States.

== Rules and Regulations ==
The International Emmy for Best Actor is awarded to a male performance in a made-for-television fiction program (i.e., a telefilm, miniseries, telenovela, drama series, or comedy). According to International Academy rules, only performances from a program entered into the competition are eligible. The same performer may be submitted for different productions as separate entries. More than one male performance from the same production may also be submitted.

To qualify, a performer must appear in at least 10% of the total airtime of the submitted episode. If the performance is part of a series, only one episode needs to have had its first broadcast within the listed eligibility dates.

== History ==
The first recipient of the International Emmy Award for Best Performance by an Actor was French actor Thierry Frémont for his role in the telefilm Dans la tête du tueur, a co-production between the TF1 network and GMT Productions, directed by Claude-Michel Rome. British actor Ray Winstone won the following year for his role as Vincent Gallagher in the drama series Vincent, produced by Rebecca Hodgson and John Rushton, and aired on ITV.

In 2007, Dutch actor Pierre Bokma, who won for De uitverkorene, shared the prize with British actor Jim Broadbent, who also won for his performance in The Street. In subsequent years, the Emmy was awarded exclusively to British actors: David Suchet won for portraying Robert Maxwell in Maxwell; Ben Whishaw for his role in Criminal Justice; Bob Hoskins for The Street; and Christopher Eccleston for Accused.

Argentine actor Darío Grandinetti won an Emmy in 2012 for his role as Mario in the miniseries Televisión por la inclusión, created by Bernarda Llorente and Claudio Villarruel. In 2013, Sean Bean won an International Emmy for playing a transvestite in the BBC One drama series Accused. At the 2014 ceremony, the Best Actor trophy went to Stephen Dillane for his role as Karl Roebuck in The Tunnel.

Dutch actor Maarten Heijmans won the International Emmy for Best Actor for his portrayal of actor and singer Ramses Shaffy in the television series Ramses. Academy Award-winner Dustin Hoffman was named Best Actor at the 44th International Emmy Awards in 2016. Kenneth Branagh won the Emmy for Best Actor for his performance in the BBC detective drama Wallender.

In 2018, Danish star Lars Mikkelsen won Best Performance by an Actor for his role in the drama television series Ride Upon the Storm. Famous Turkish actor Haluk Bilginer won the Best Performance by an Actor award for his role in the TV series Şahsiyet.

The thirteen-year-old British actor Billy Barratt made history by becoming the youngest person ever to win an International Emmy Award at the 2020 ceremony.

== Winners and nominees ==
=== 2000s ===
Year	Recipient	Character	English title	Original title	Country
2005	Thierry Frémont	Francis Heaulme	Murder in Mind	Dans la tête du tueur	France
2005	David Walliams	Multiple characters	Little Britain		United Kingdom
2005	Rhys Ifans	Peter Cook	Not Only But Always		United Kingdom
2005	Douglas Silva	Acerola	City of Men	Cidade dos Homens	Brazil
2006	Ray Winstone	Vincent Gallagher	Vincent		United Kingdom
2006	Bernard Farcy	Charles de Gaulle	Le Grand Charles		France
2006	Bernard Hill	David Blunkett	A Very Social Secretary		United Kingdom
2006	Lin Shen	Feng Qi	The Confession of Feng Qi		China
2007	Jim Broadbent	Stan McDermott	The Street		United Kingdom
2007	Pierre Bokma	Peter van der Laan	The Chosen One	De uitverkorene	Netherlands
2007	Bobby Au-yeung	Chai Foon-Cheung	Dicey Business	賭場風雲 / Dǔchǎng fēngyún	Hong Kong
2007	Lázaro Ramos	Foguinho	Snakes & Lizards	Cobras & Lagartos	Brazil
2007	Guo Jiaming	Xiao Yang	My Own Private Deutschland	我自己的德意志 / Wo zi ji de de yi zhi	China
2008	David Suchet	Robert Maxwell	Maxwell		United Kingdom
2008	Pedro Cardoso	Agostinho Carrara	The Big Family	A Grande Família	Brazil
2008	Karl Markovics	Franz Fuchs	Franz Fuchs - A Patriot	Franz Fuchs – Ein Patriot	Austria
2008	Cheng-yang Wang	Liu Yishou	The I-go King and His Son		China
2009	Ben Whishaw	Ben Coulter	Criminal Justice		United Kingdom
2009	Oscar Olivares	Antonia Salgado	Capadocia		Mexico
2009	Robert de Hoog	Frankie	Skin		Netherlands
2009	Li Chen	Liu Wu	Ultimate Rescue	极限救援 / Jíxiàn jiùyuán	China

=== 2010s ===
Year	Recipient	Character	English title	Original title	Country
2010	Bob Hoskins	Paddy Gargan	The Street		United Kingdom
2010	Sebastian Koch	Wolf Larsen	Sea Wolf	Der Seewolf	Germany
2010	Sid Lucero	Alfred "Red" Ramirez	Dahil May Isang Ikaw		Philippines
2010	Leonardo Sbaraglia	The killer	Epitafios		Argentina
2011	Christopher Eccleston	Willy Houlihan	Accused		United Kingdom
2011	Fábio Assunção	Herivelto Martins	Songs of Betrayal	Dalva e Herivelto: uma Canção de Amor	Brazil
2011	Jang Hyuk	Lee Dae-gil	The Slave Hunters	추노 / Chuno	South Korea
2011	Michael Nyqvist	Mikael Blomkvist	Millennium		Sweden
2012	Darío Grandinetti	Mario	Televisión por la inclusión		Argentina
2012	Arthur Acuña	Harry Shaw	The Kitchen Musical		Singapore
2012	Jason Isaacs	Jackson Brodie	Case Histories		United Kingdom
2012	Stein Winge	Frank	Norwegian Cozy	Koselig med peis	Norway
2012	Zhu Yawen	Gao Zhihang	Flying Eagle	远去的飞鹰 / Yuǎn qù de fēi yīng	China
2013	Sean Bean	Simon Gaskell/Tracie Tremarco	Accused		United Kingdom
2013	Heino Ferch	Richard Brock	Anatomy of Revenge	Spuren des Bösen	Germany
2013	Marcos Palmeira	Mandrake	Mandrake		Brazil
2013	Shinichi Tsutsumi	Yasuo ichikawa	Yasu – A Single Father’s Story		Japan
2014	Stephen Dillane	Karl Roebuck	The Tunnel		United Kingdom
2014	Claude Legault	Benoît "Ben" Chartier	19-2		Canada
2014	Pablo Rago	Sgto. Farías	Televisión por la Justicia		Argentina
2014	Wu Xiubo	Cheng Ying	The Orphan of Zhao	趙氏孤兒案 / Zhào shì gū'ér àn	China
2015	Maarten Heijmans	Ramses Shaffy	Ramses		Netherlands
2015	Engin Akyurek	Ömer Demir	Black Money Love	Kara Para Aşk	Turkey
2015	Emílio de Mello	Dr. Carlo Antonini	Psi		Brazil
2015	Rafe Spall	Joe Potter	Black Mirror: "White Christmas"		United Kingdom
2016	Dustin Hoffman	Mr Henry Hoppy	Roald Dahl's Esio Trot		United Kingdom
2016	Alexandre Nero	Romero Rômulo	Rules of the Game	A Regra do Jogo	Brazil
2016	Florian Stetter	Hans Pippig	Naked Among Wolves	Nackt unter Wölfen	Germany
2016	James Wen	Chen Kun Hua	Echoes of Time		Singapore
2017	Kenneth Branagh	Inspector Kurt Wallander	Wallander		United Kingdom
2017	Júlio Andrade	Cadu	One Against All	1 Contra Todos	Brazil
2017	Zanjoe Marudo	Victor	Maalaala Mo Kaya		Philippines
2017	Kad Merad	Philippe Rickwaert	Baron Noir		France
2018	Lars Mikkelsen	Johannes Krogh	Ride Upon the Storm	Herrens Veje	Denmark
2018	Júlio Andrade	Cadu	One Against All	1 Contra Todos	Brazil
2018	Billy Campbell	Det. John Cardinal	Cardinal		Canada
2018	Tolga Sarıtaş	Yavuz Karasu	Söz		Turkey
2019	Haluk Bilginer	Agâh Beyoglu	Şahsiyet		Turkey
2019	Christopher Eccleston	Greg Farrell	Come Home		United Kingdom
2019	Raphael Logam	Evandro do Dendê	Impure	Impuros	Brazil
2019	Jannis Niewöhner	Robert "Beat" Schlag	Beat		Germany

=== 2020s ===
Year	Recipient	Character	English title	Original title	Country
2020	Billy Barratt	Ray	Responsible Child		United Kingdom
2020	Guido Caprino	Pietro Bosco	1994		Italy
2020	Raphael Logam	Evandro do Dendê	Impure	Impuros	Brazil
2020	Arjun Mathur	Karan Mehra	Made in Heaven		India
2021	David Tennant	Dennis Nilsen	Des		United Kingdom
2021	Roy Nik	Noam Ashkenazi	Normali		Israel
2021	Nawazuddin Siddiqui	Ayyan Mani	Serious Men		India
2021	Christian Tappan	Jaime Molina	The Great Heist	El robo del siglo	Colombia
2022	Dougray Scott	Ray Lennox	Irvine Welsh's Crime		United Kingdom
2022	Sverrir Gudnason	Kurt Haijby	A Royal Secret	En Kunglig Affär	Sweden
2022	Scoot McNairy	D.E.A Special Agent Walt Breslin	Narcos: Mexico		Mexico
2022	Lee Sun-kyun	Sewon Koh	Dr. Brain	Dr. 브레인 / Dr. Beurein	South Korea
2023	Martin Freeman	Chris Carson	The Responder		United Kingdom
2023	Gustavo Bassani	José Pérez / Yosi	Yosi, the Regretful Spy	Iosi, el espía arrepentido	Argentina
2023	Jonas Karlsson	Tommy	Riding in Darkness	Nattryttarna	Sweden
2023	Jim Sarbh	Dr. Homi J. Bhabha	Rocket Boys		India
2024	Timothy Spall	Peter Farquhar	The Sixth Commandment		United Kingdom
2024	Haluk Bilginer	Agâh Beyoğlu	Şahsiyet		Turkey
2024	Laurent Lafitte	Bernard Tapie	Class Act	Tapie	France
2024	Júlio Andrade	Herbert Jose "Betinho" de Souza	Living on a Razor's Edge	Betinho: No Fio da Navalha	Brazil
2025	Oriol Pla	Javier Giner	I, Addict	Yo, adicto	Spain
2025	Diljit Dosanjh	Amar Singh Chamkila	Amar Singh Chamkila		India
2025	David Mitchell	Ludwig and James Taylor	Ludwig		United Kingdom
2025	Diego Vásquez	José Arcadio Buendía	One Hundred Years of Solitude	Cien años de soledad	Colombia
2026	Javier Cámara	Joserra	Jakarta	Yakarta	Spain
2026	Ricardo Darín	Juan Salvo	The Eternaut	El eternauta	Argentina
2026	Ian Roberts	Dan Hart	A Kind of Madness		South Africa
2026	Bobby Schofield	Joe Mitchell	Unforgivable		United Kingdom

== Photo Gallery ==
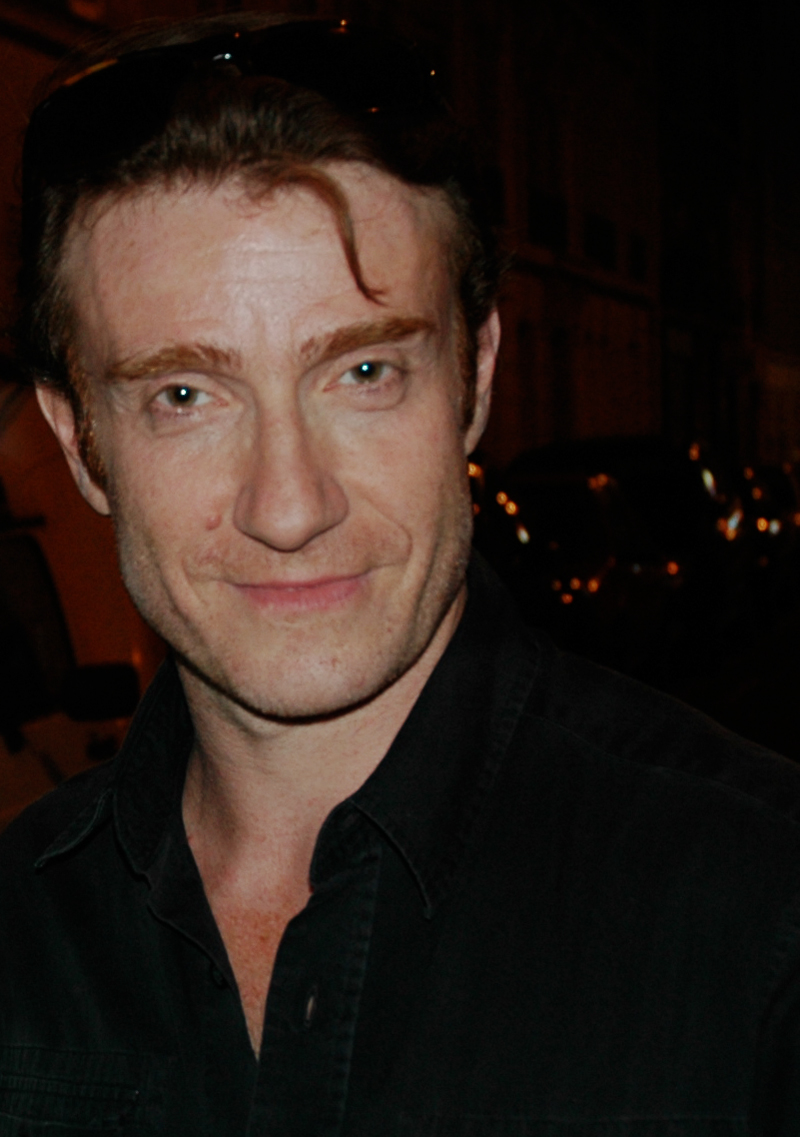
Thierry Frémont, winner in 2005.

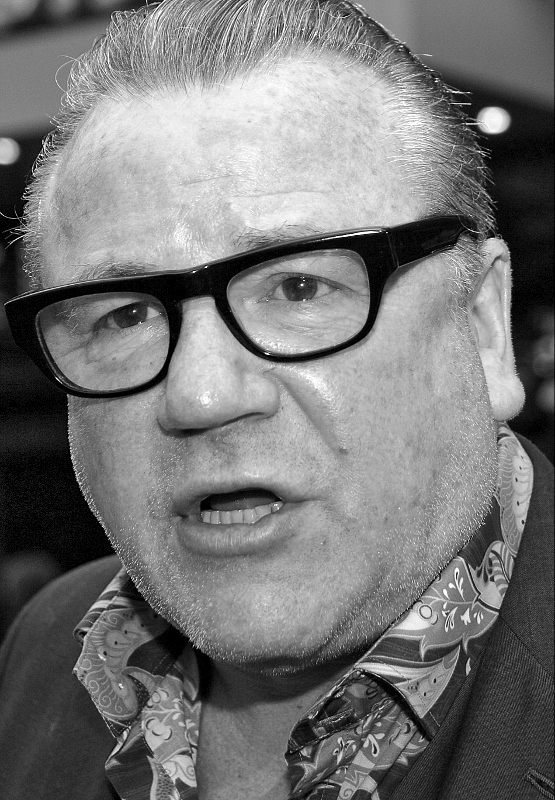
Ray Winstone, winner in 2006.

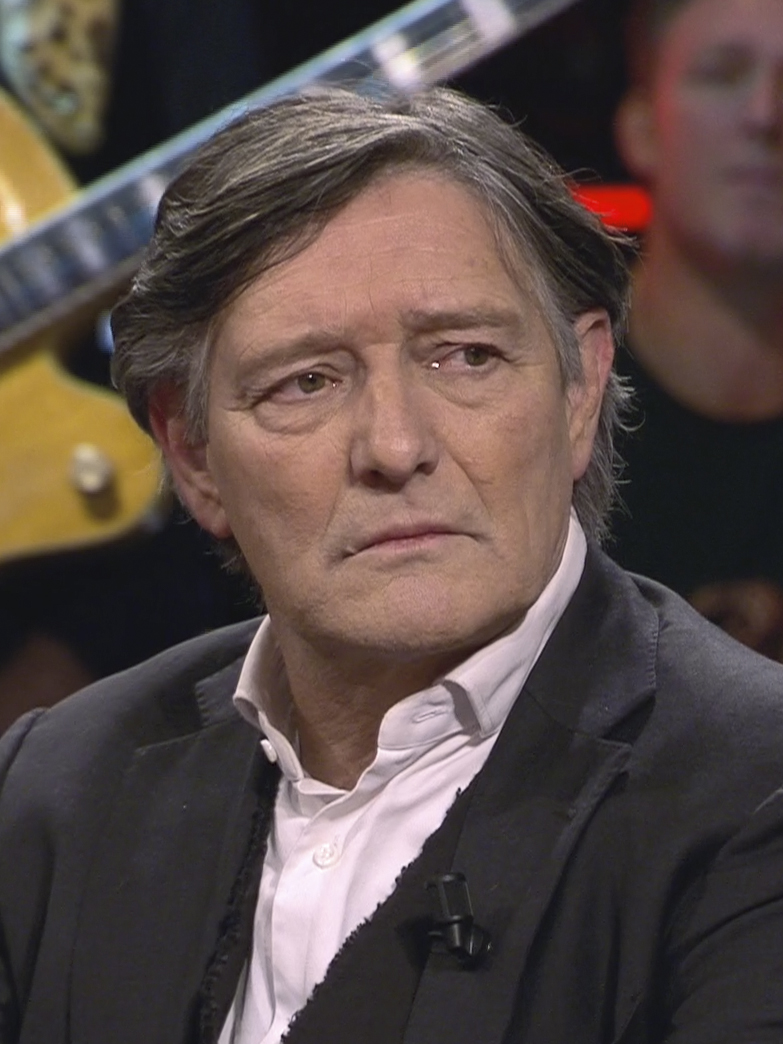
Pierre Bokma, winner in 2007.

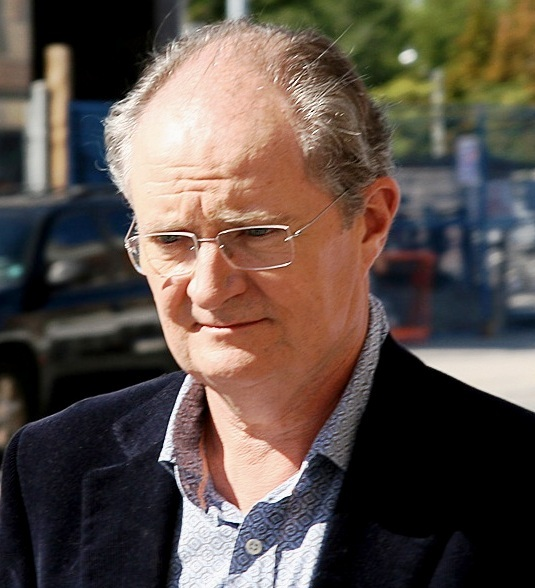
Jim Broadbent, winner in 2007.

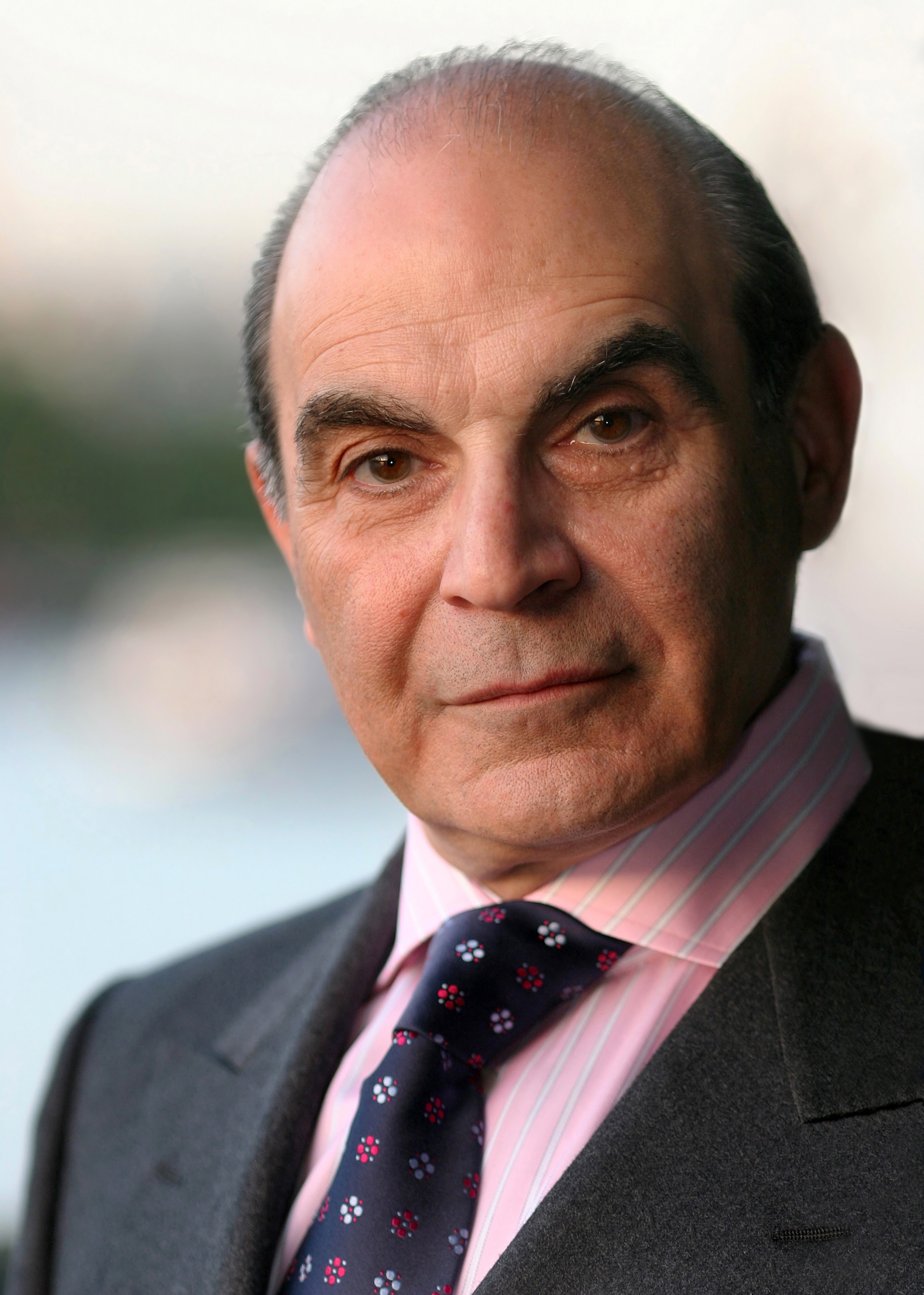
David Suchet, winner in 2008.

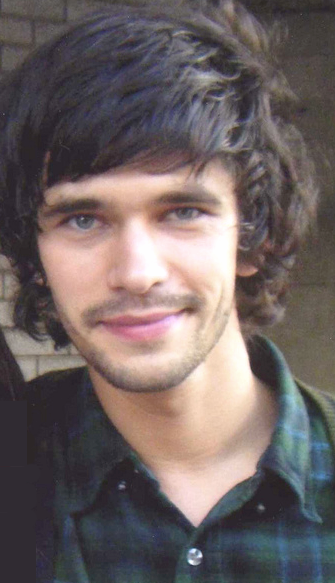
Ben Whishaw, winner in 2009.

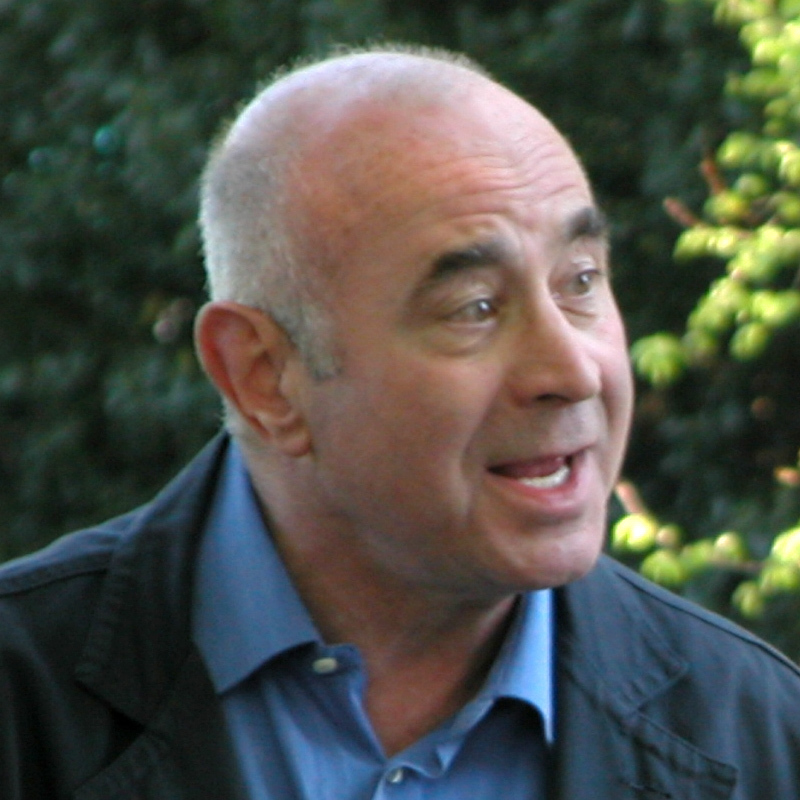
Bob Hoskins, winner in 2010.

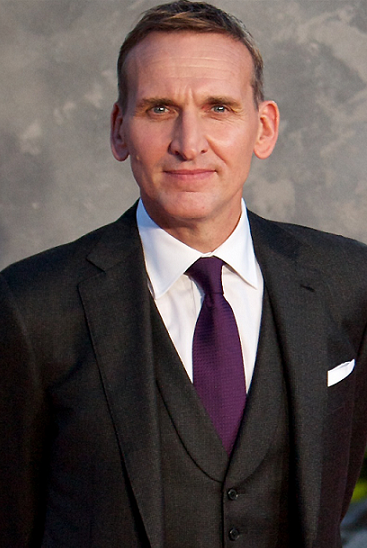
Christopher Eccleston, winner in 2011.

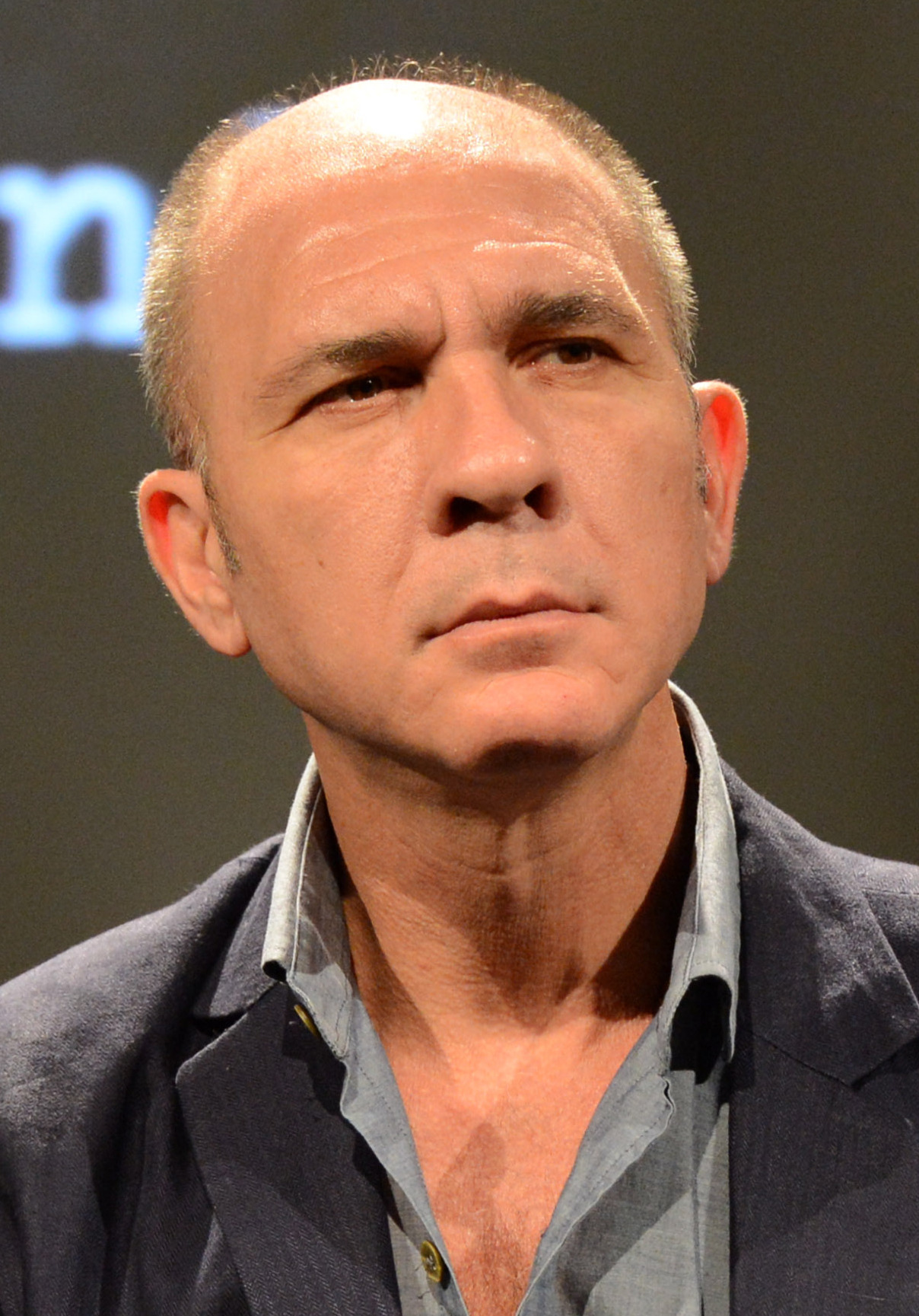
Darío Grandinetti, winner in 2012.

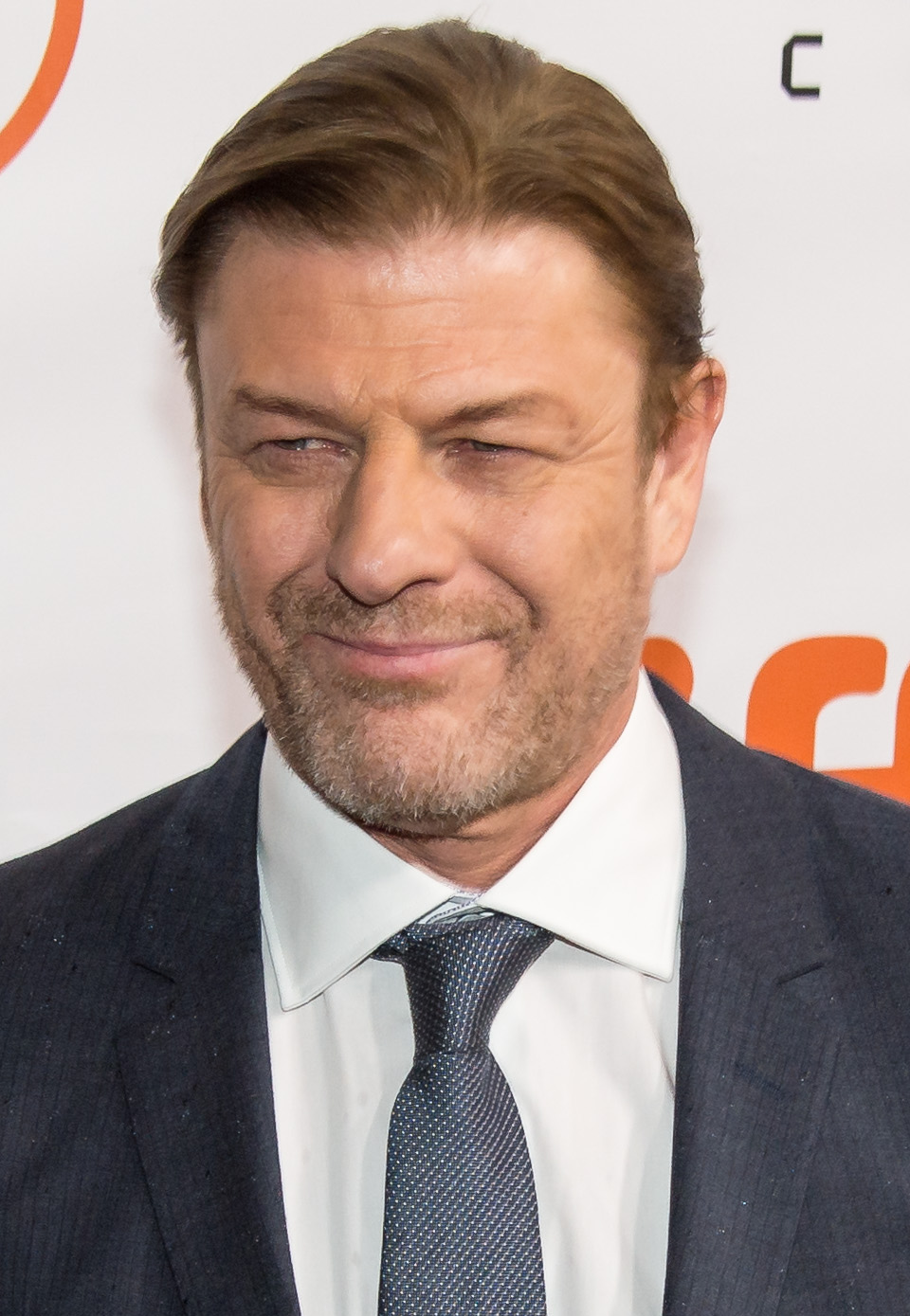
Sean Bean, winner in 2013.

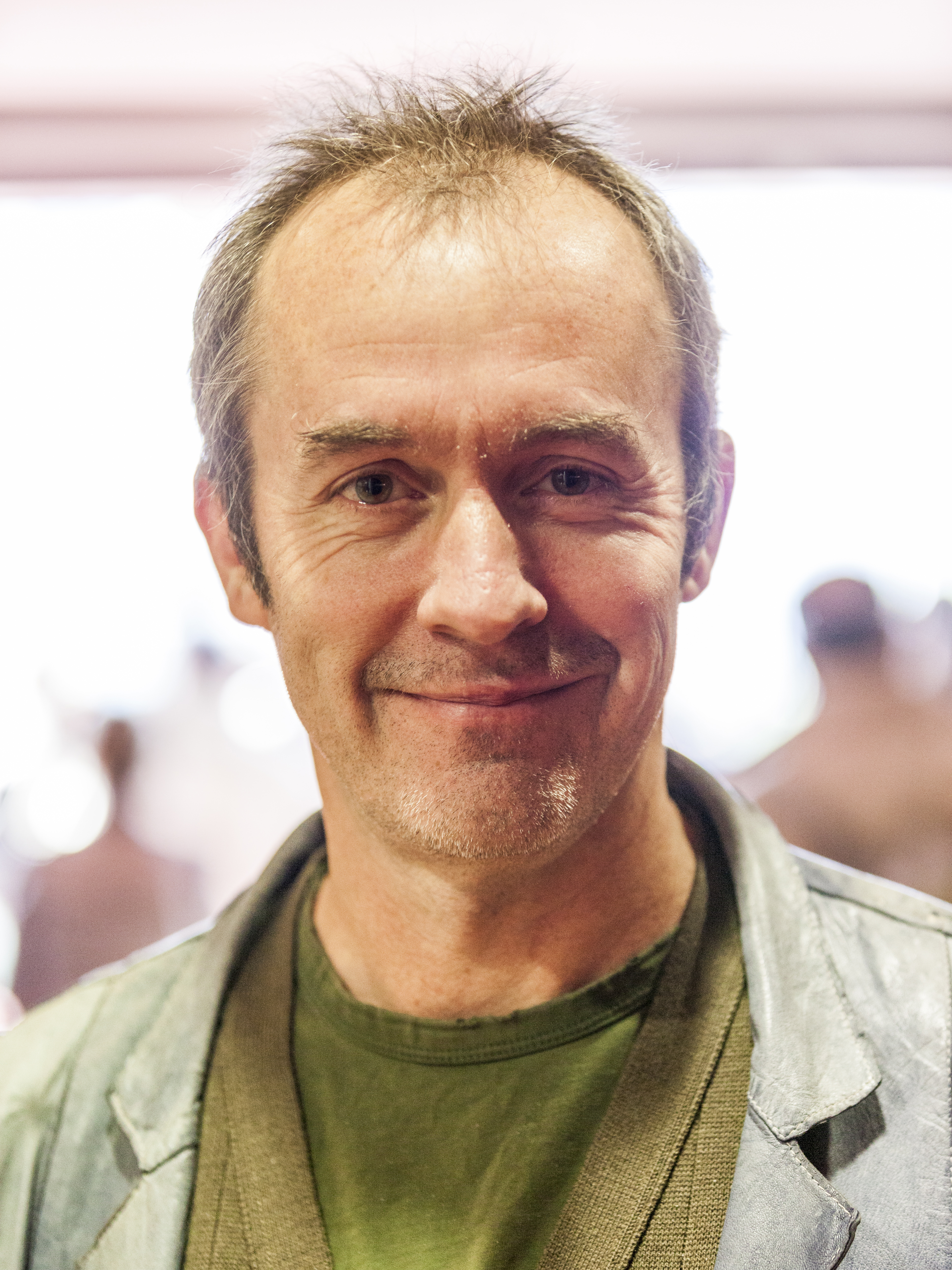
Stephen Dillane, winner in 2014.

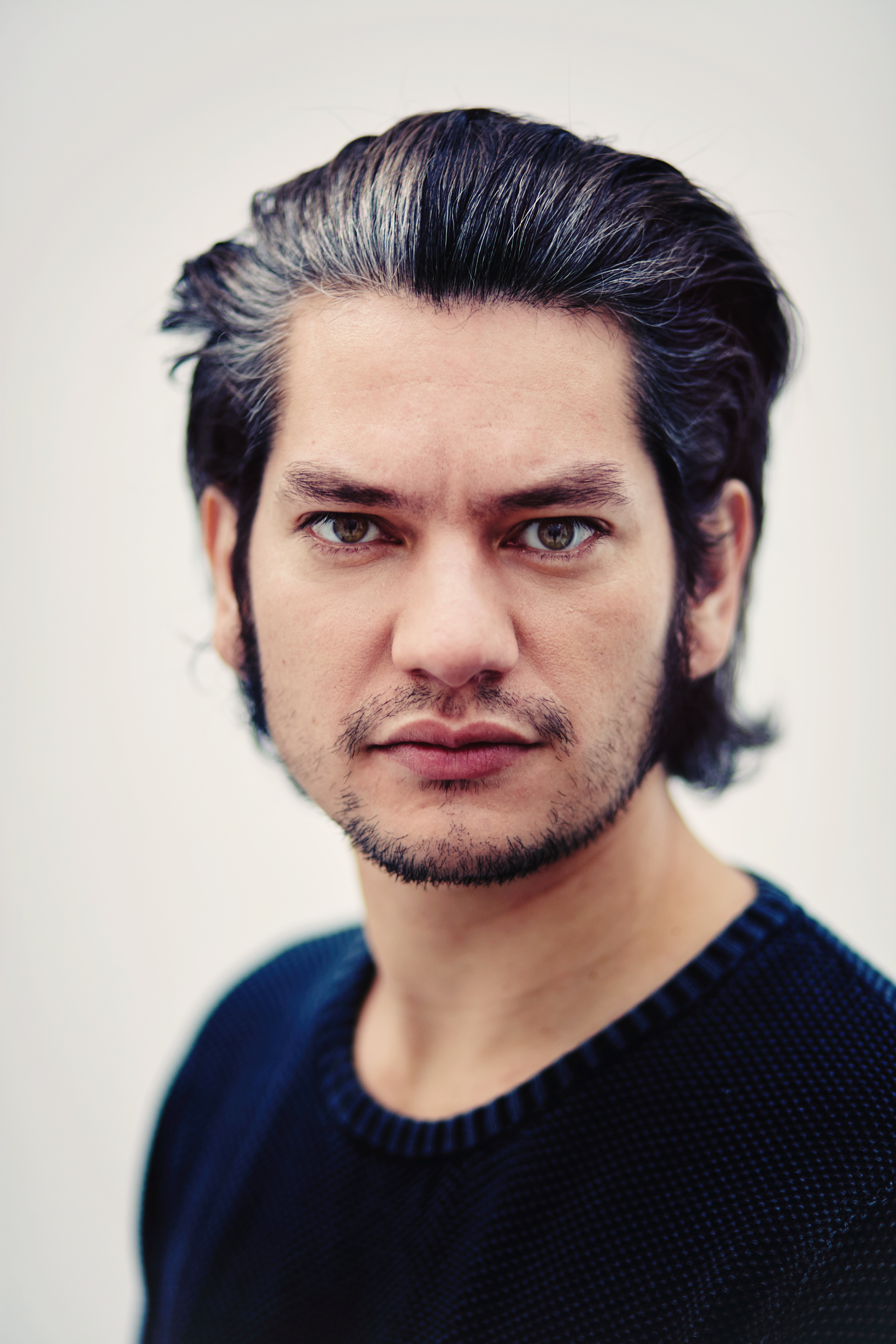
Maarten Heijmans, winner in 2015.

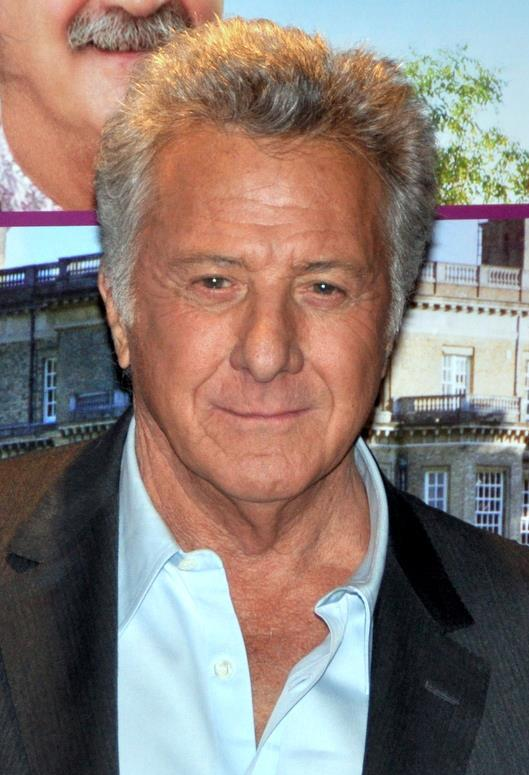
Dustin Hoffman, winner in 2016.

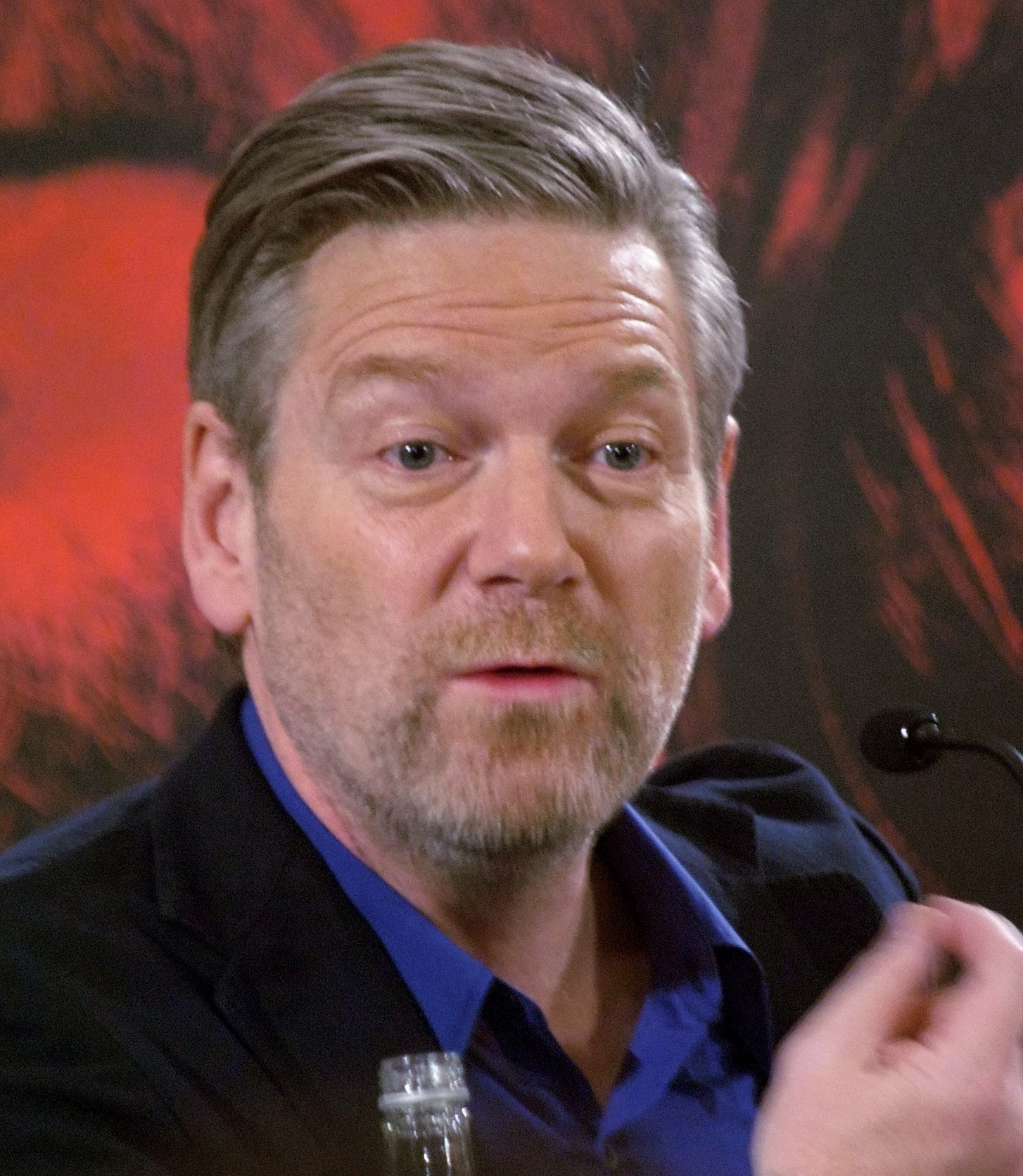
Kenneth Branagh, winner in 2017.

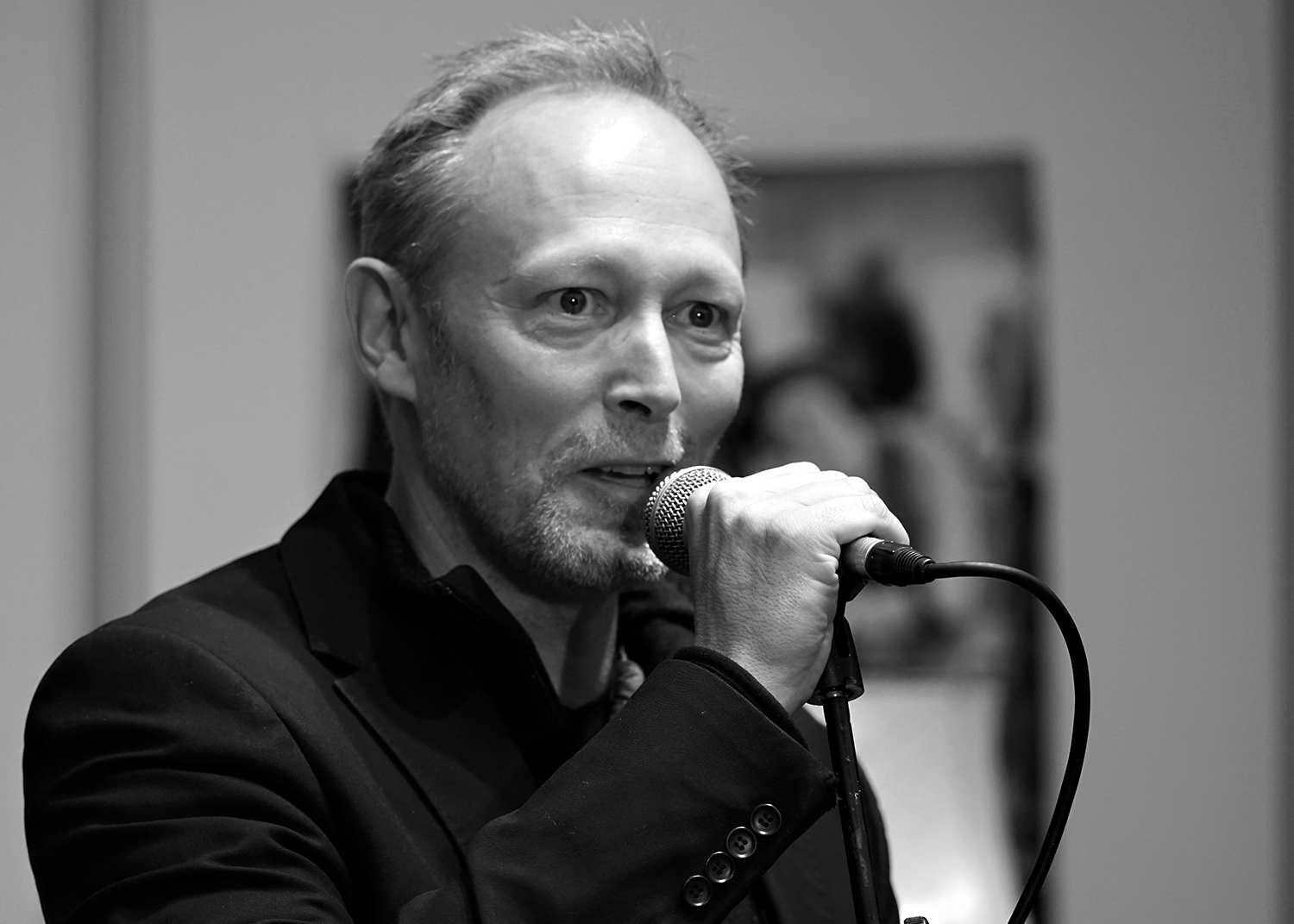
Lars Mikkelsen, winner in 2018.

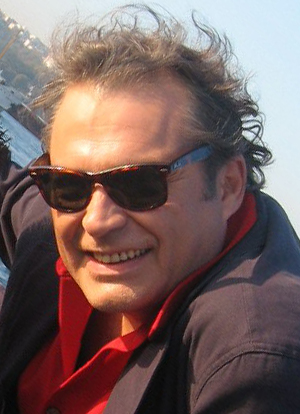
Haluk Bilginer, winner in 2019

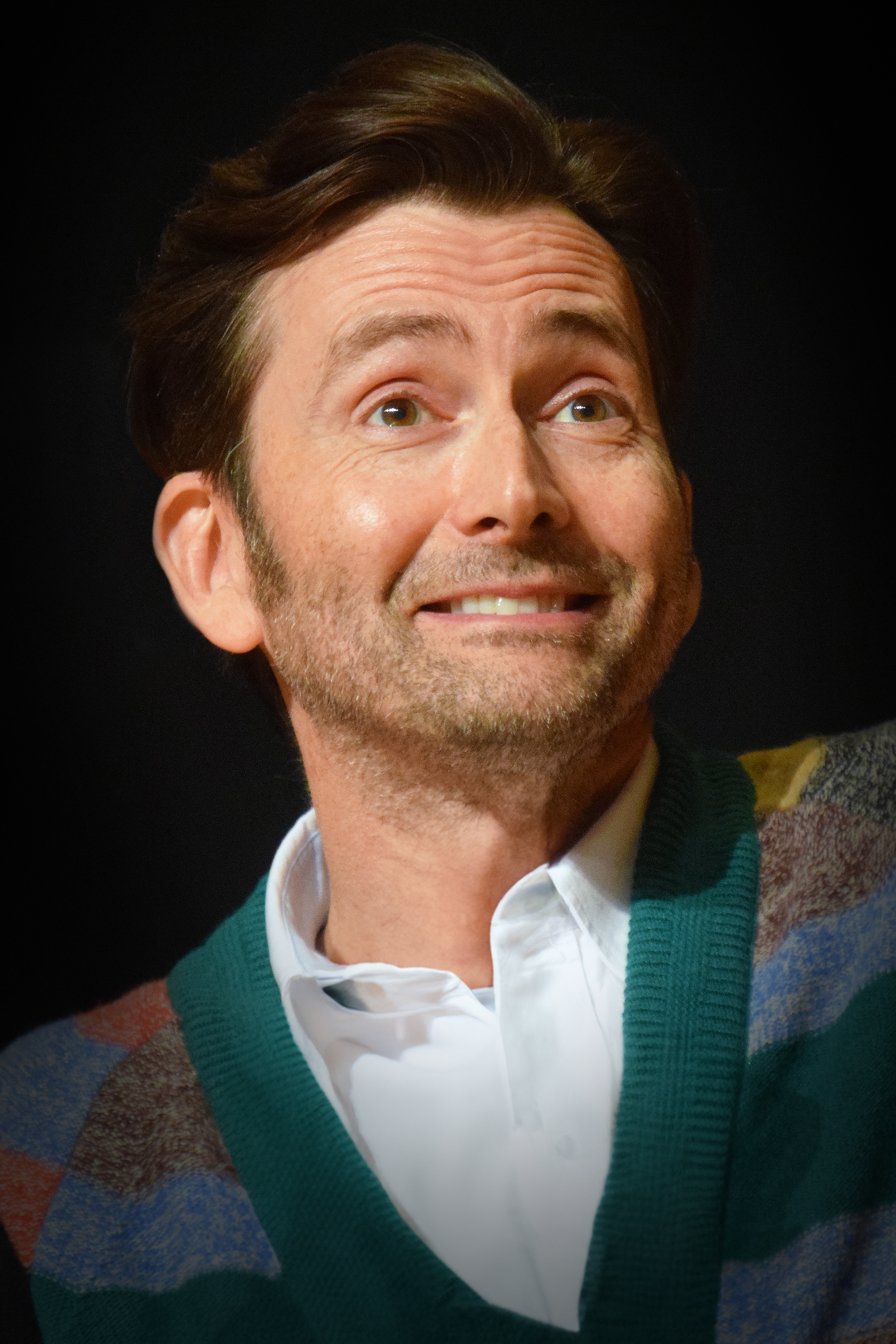
David Tennant, winner in 2021.

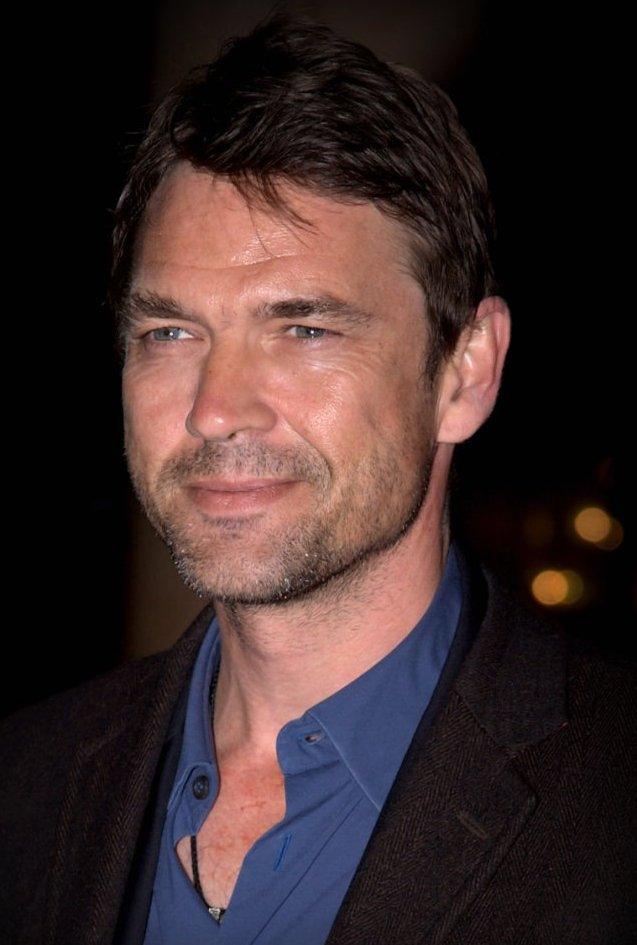
Dougray Scott, winner in 2022.

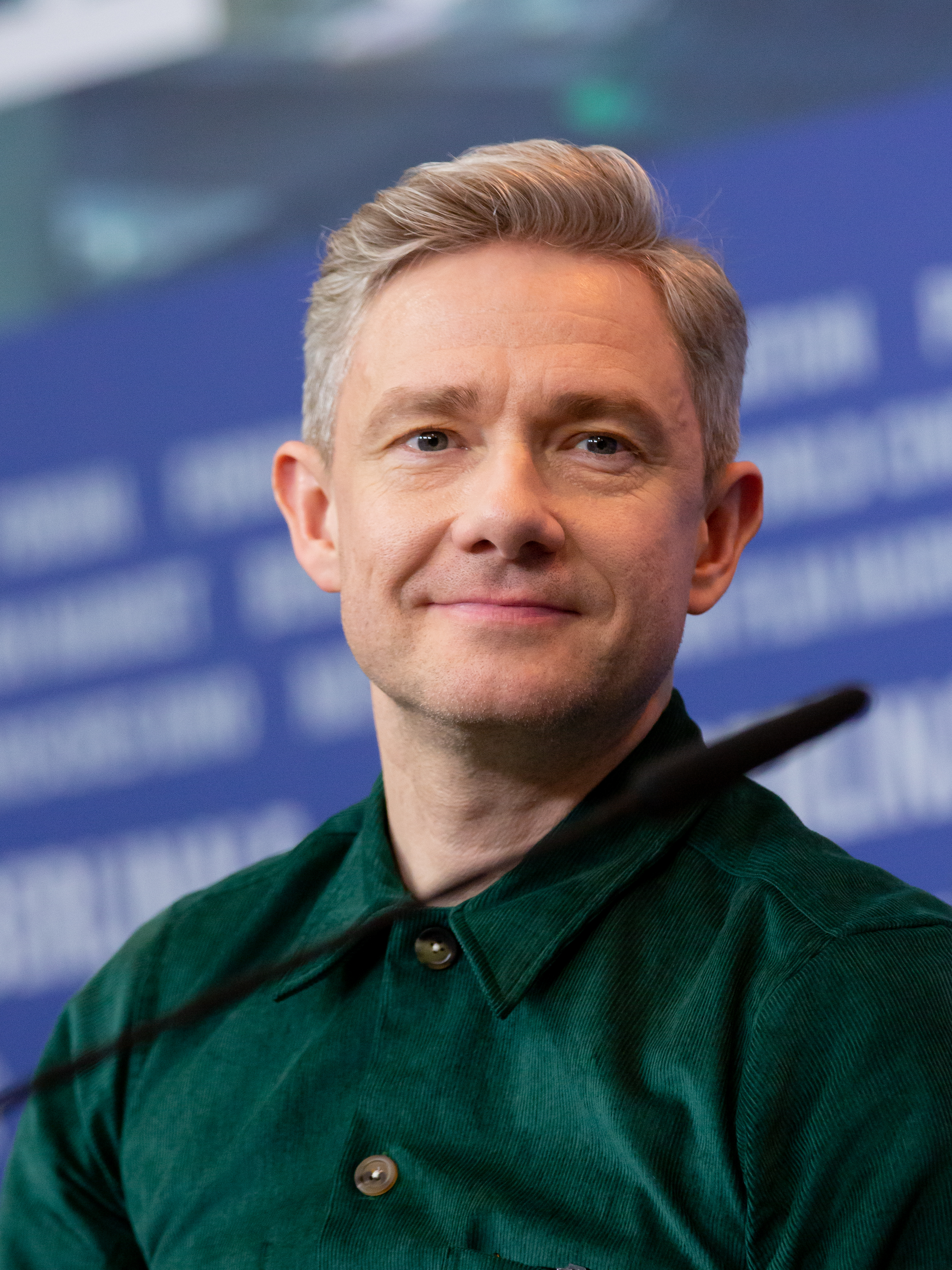
Martin Freeman, winner in 2023.

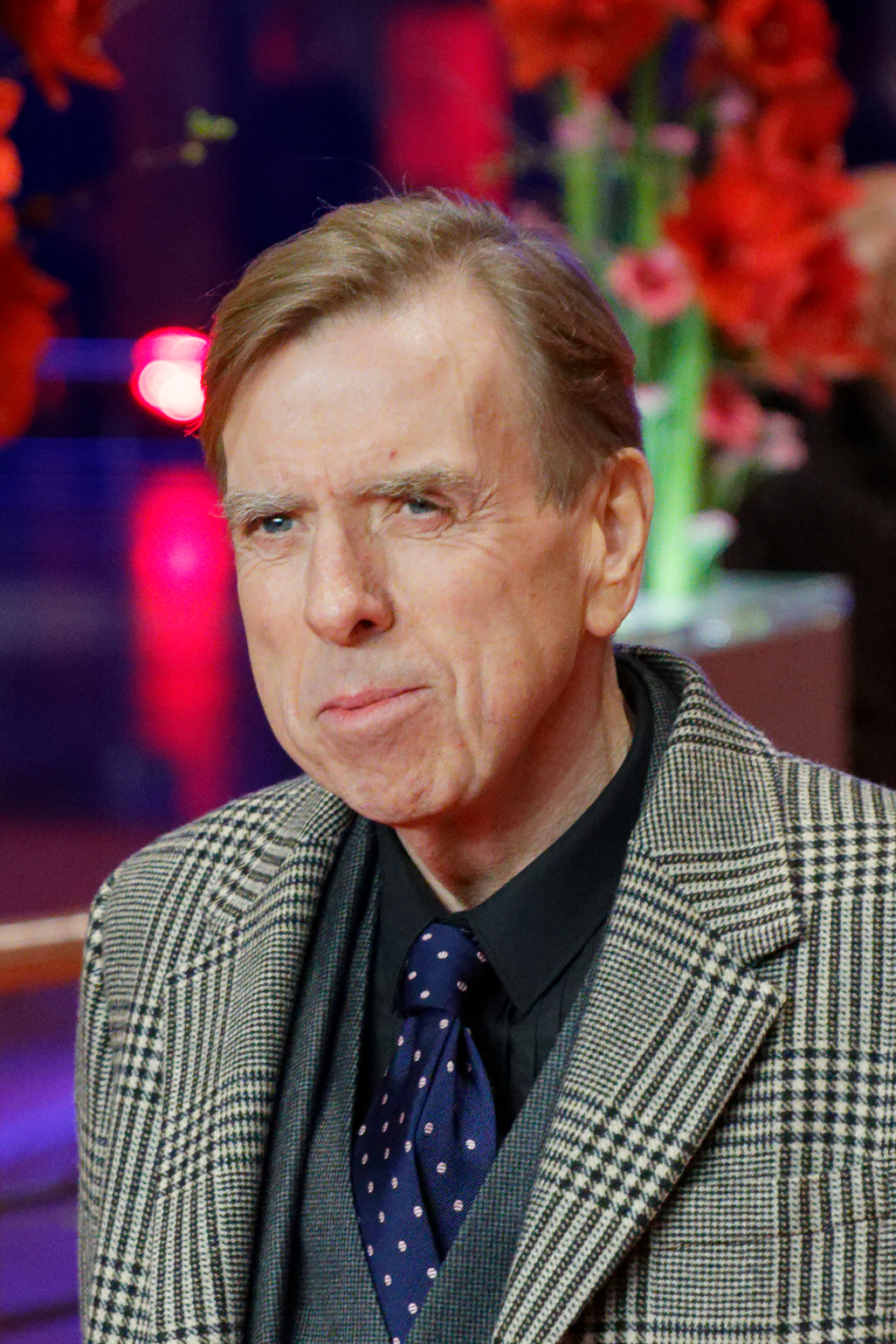
Timothy Spall, winner in 2024.
