= 43rd International Emmy Awards =

2015 awards ceremony

- Promotional poster
- Date: November 23, 2015
- Location: New York Hilton Midtown, New York City
- Hosted by: Bassem Youssef

Highlights
- Founders Award: Julian Fellowes

Television/radio coverage
- Network: TBA

The 43rd International Emmy Awards took place on November 23, 2015, in New York Hilton Midtown in New York City. The award ceremony, presented by the International Academy of Television Arts and Sciences (IATAS), honors all TV programming produced and originally aired outside the United States. This year's ceremony was hosted by Egyptian satirist Bassem Youssef.

== Ceremony ==
Nominations for the 43rd International Emmy Awards were announced on October 5, 2015, by the International Academy of Television Arts & Sciences (IATAS) at a Press Conference at Mipcom in Cannes. There are 40 nominees across 10 categories and 19 countries. Nominees come from: Angola, Austria, Argentina, Belgium, Brazil, Canada, Colombia, France, Japan, Mexico, Netherlands, Norway, Portugal, Spain, South Africa, South Korea, Turkey, United Kingdom and the United States.

In addition to the presentation of the International Emmys for programming and performances, the International Academy presented two special awards. Downton Abbey creator, Julian Fellowes received the Founders Award and Richard Plepler, chairman and CEO of HBO network, received the Directorate Award.

== Summary ==
Country	Nominations	Wins
United Kingdom	7	1
Brazil	5	2
France	4	3
United States	4	1
South Africa	3	1
Colombia	2	0
Japan	2	0
Netherlands	1	1
Norway	1	1
Turkey	1	0

== Winners and nominees ==
Best Telenovela	Best Drama Series
Império (Brazil) (Rede Globo); Ciega a citas (Spain) (Cuatro); Jikulumessu (Angola) (Semba Comunicação); Mulheres (Portugal) (TVI)	Spiral (France) (Canal+); Mozu (Japan) (TBS/WOWOW/ROBOT); My Mad Fat Diary (United Kingdom) (E4); Psi (Brazil) (HBO Latin America)
Best TV Movie or Miniseries	Best Arts Programming
Soldat blanc (France) (Canal+); La celebración (Argentina) (Underground Producciones); Common (United Kingdom) (LA Productions); Storytelling of Hostages (Japan) (WOWOW/Twins Japan)	The Man Who Saved the Louvre (France) (Ladybird Films); Buenaventura, no me dejes más (Colombia) (Caracol TV/Laberinto Producciones); Messiah at the Foundling Hospital (United Kingdom) (Reef Television); Trial of Chunhyyang – A Girl Prosecuted by Feudalism (South Korea) (KBS)
Best Comedy Series	Best Documentary
Sweet Mother (Brazil) (Rede Globo); Fais pas ci, fais pas ça (France) (France 2); Familia en venta (Colombia) (Fox International/Fox Telecolombia); ZANEWS (South Africa) (Both Worlds); Sensitive Skin (Canada) (HBO Canada)	Miners Shot Down (South Africa) (Uhuru Productions); Africa's Wild West - Stallions of the Namib Desert (Austria) (Interspot Film/ORF/Arte/NDR); Antes de que nos Olviden (Mexico) (HBO Latin America); Growing Up Down's (United Kingdom) (Maverick Television/Dartmouth Films)
Best Actor	Best Actress
Maarten Heijmans in Ramses (Netherlands) (De Familie Film & TV); Engin Akyurek in Black Money Love (Turkey) (Ay Yapim); Emílio de Mello in Psi (Brazil) (HBO Brasil); Rafe Spall in Black Mirror (United Kingdom) (Channel 4)	Anneke von der Lippe in Eyewitness (Norway) (NRK/SVT/DR/Yle Fem/Nordvision); Fernanda Montenegro in Sweet Mother (Brazil) (Endor Productions/Red Arrow Films); Sheridan Smith in Cilla (United Kingdom) (ITV)
Best Non-English Language U.S. Primetime Program	Best Non-Scripted Entertainment
Infierno de Montoya (United States) (NatGeo/Fox Telecolombia); El Mejor de los Peores (United States) (Fox International/ Fox Toma 1); Narco-Tec (United States) (Mazdoc/Zodiak Latino/Univision); La Voz Kids (United States) (Talpa Media USA/WHTV)	50 Ways to Kill Your Mammy (United Kingdom) (Sky1); Barones de la Cerveza (Argentina) (NatGeo); Flying Doctors (Belgium) (Geronimo); MasterChef South Africa (South Africa) (Quizzical Pictures/Lucky Bean Media)
