= 48th International Emmy Awards =

2020 awards ceremony

- Promotional poster.
- Date: November 23, 2020
- Location: Hammerstein Ballroom, New York City
- Hosted by: Richard Kind

Highlights
- Founders Award: Andrew Cuomo

Television/radio coverage
- Network: International Academy's website

The 48th International Emmys Awards took place on November 23, 2020, in New York City. The award ceremony, presented by the International Academy of Television Arts and Sciences (IATAS), honors all TV programming produced and originally aired outside the United States and celebrated excellence in International television.

The International Academy presented 1 Special Award and 12 Emmys across 11 categories, due to a tie in the Non-English Language U.S. Primetime category. Due to the COVID-19 pandemic, the awards were held virtually for the first time in the history of International Emmys.

== Ceremony ==
Nominations for the 48th International Emmy Awards were announced on September 24, 2020, by the International Academy of Television Arts & Sciences (IATAS). There are 44 Nominees across 11 categories and 20 countries. Nominees come from: Argentina, Australia, Belgium, Brazil, China, Colombia, Czech Republic, France, Germany, India, Israel, Italy, Japan, Norway, Portugal, Singapore, South Korea, Thailand, the United Kingdom and the United States. All these programs were broadcast between January 1 and December 31, 2019; in accordance with the competition's eligibility period. Netflix led as nominations for the award, followed by HBO and Rede Globo.

In addition to the presentation of the International Emmys for programming and performances, the International Academy presented one special award. New York Governor Andrew Cuomo received the Founders Award in recognition of his leadership during the COVID-19 pandemic in New York. In August 2021, International TV Academy rescinded Cuomo's Emmy. Cuomo stepped down as governor after a state investigation concluded he sexually harassed women who worked for him.

== Winners and nominees ==
Best Actor	Best Actress
Billy Barratt in Responsible Child (United Kingdom) (Kudos/72 Films); Guido Caprino in 1994 (Italy) (Sky/Wildside/Beta Film); Raphael Logam in Impuros (Brazil) (Fox Networks Group/Barry Company); Arjun Mathur in Made in Heaven (India) (Excel Media/Tiger Baby Productions)	Glenda Jackson in Elizabeth Is Missing (United Kingdom) (STV); Emma Bading in Play(Germany) (Sappralot Productions); Andréa Beltrão in Hebe (Brazil) (Rede Globo); Yeo Yann Yann in Invisible Stories (Singapore) (HBO)
Best Drama Series	Best Comedy Series
Delhi Crime (India) (Netflix); Charité (Germany) (UFA Fiction); Criminal: UK (United Kingdom) (Idiotlamp Productions/Netflix); The Bronze Garden (Argentina) (HBO Latin America/Polka)	Nobody's Looking (Brazil) (Gullane Entretenimento/Netflix); Back to Life (United Kingdom) (Showtime/Two Brothers Pictures); Fifty (Israel) (Endemol Shine/Yes); Four More Shots Please! (India) (Pritish Nandy Communications)
Best TV Movie or Miniseries	Best Arts Programming
Responsible Child (United Kingdom) (Kudos/72 Films); L'Effondrement (France) (Canal+); Elis – Viver é Melhor que Sonhar (Brazil) (Rede Globo); The Festival of the Little Gods (Japan) (Tohoku Broadcasting)	Vertige de la chute (France) (Babel Doc/France Televisions); Jake and Charice (Japan) (NHK); Refavela 40 (Brazil) (HBO Brasil/Conspiração Filmes); Why do we Dance? (United Kingdom) (Sky Arts)
Best Documentary	Best Telenovela
For Sama (United Kingdom) (Channel 4 News/ITN/PBS); El testigo (Colombia) (Caracol Television); Granni-E-minem (South Korea) (KBS); Terug naar Rwanda (Belgium) (De Chinezen/VRT)	Órfãos da Terra (Brazil) (Rede Globo); Love and Destiny (China) (Gcoo Entertainment/iQIYI); Na Corda Bamba (Portugal) (Plural Entertainment/TVI); Pequeña Victoria (Argentina) (VIS/Oficina Burman)
Short-Form Series	Best Non-Scripted Entertainment
#martyisdead (Czech Republic) (Bionaut/MALL.TV/cz.nic); Content (Australia) (Ludo Studio); Mil manos por Argentina (Argentina) (Storylab/Atomic Lab/Flow); People Like Us (Singapore) (Cheo Pictures/Pilgrim Pictures)	Old People's Home for 4 Year Olds (Australia) (Endemol Shine); Canta Comigo (Brazil) (RecordTV/Endemol Shine); Folkeopplysningen (Norway) (Teddy TV); MasterChef Thailand (Thailand) (Heliconia H Group Company)
Best Non-English Language U.S. Primetime Program
2019 Latin Grammy Awards (United States) (Univision/The Latin Recording Academy) (tie); La Reina del Sur (United States) (Telemundo/Netflix) (tie); You Cannot Hide (United States) (Telemundo/Netflix); Preso No. 1 (United States) (Telemundo/Keshet)

== Countries with multiple nominations and awards ==
Multiple nominations
Nominations	Country
7	Brazil
7	United Kingdom
4	United States
3	India
3	Argentina
2	Australia
2	Germany
2	Japan
2	France
2	Singapore

Multiple awards
Awards	Country
4	United Kingdom
2	Brazil
2	United States
