= 44th International Emmy Awards =

2016 awards ceremony

- Promotional poster
- Date: November 21, 2016
- Location: New York Hilton Midtown, New York City
- Hosted by: Alan Cumming

Highlights
- Founders Award: Shonda Rhimes

Television/radio coverage
- Network: TBA

The 44th International Emmy Awards took place on November 21, 2016, in New York City and was hosted by actor Alan Cumming. The award ceremony, presented by the International Academy of Television Arts and Sciences (IATAS), honors all TV programming produced and originally aired outside the United States.

== Summary ==
Country	Nominations	Wins
Brazil	7	1
United Kingdom	6	3
Germany	5	3
United States	4	1
Canada	3	0
South Korea	3	0
Argentina	2	0
France	2	0
Philippines	2	0
Sweden	1	1
Japan	1	1

== Ceremony ==
Nominations for the 44th International Emmy Awards were announced on September 26, 2016, by the International Academy of Television Arts & Sciences (IATAS). There are 40 Nominees across 10 categories and 15 countries. Nominees come from Argentina, Brazil, Canada, Colombia, France, Germany, Japan, Philippines, Singapore, South Africa, South Korea, Sweden, United Kingdom, United Arab Emirates and the United States.

In addition to the presentation of the International Emmys for programming and performances, the International Academy presented two special awards. Shonda Rhimes received the Founders Award, and Maria Rørbye Rønn of the Danish Broadcasting Corporation received the Directorate Award.

== Winners and nominees ==
Best Telenovela	Best Drama Series
Hidden Truths (Brazil) (Rede Globo); Rules of The Game (Brazil) (Rede Globo); 30 vies (Canada) (Aetios Productions); Bridges of Love (Philippines) (ABS-CBN)	Deutschland 83 (Germany) (UFA Fiction/RTL Television); 19-2 (Canada) (Sphere Media/Echo Media); La casa del mar (Argentina) (OnDIRECTV/Cisne Films/StoryLab); Waiting for Jasmin (United Arab Emirates) (ABC Production & Distribution)
Best TV Movie or Miniseries	Best Arts Programming
Capital (United Kingdom) (Kudos/BBC One); Naked Among Wolves (Germany) (UFA Fiction/ARD Degeto); Os Experientes (Brazil) (Rede Globo/O2 Filmes); Splash Splash Love (South Korea) (MBC)	The Man Who Shot Hiroshima (Japan) (WOWOW/Kmax Co.); Gabo, The Magic of Reality (Colombia) (Discovery/Caracol Televisión); Gérard Depardieu: Out of Frame (France) (Kaliste Prod./R. M. Production/France 5); Interrupt This Program (Canada) (Noble Television/Story Park Inc.)
Best Comedy Series	Best Documentary
Hoff the Record (United Kingdom) (Me & You Productions); Dix pour cent (France) (France 2); ZANEWS (South Africa) (Both Worlds); Zorra (Brazil) (Rede Globo)	War of Lies (Germany) (Zischlermann Filmproduktion); The Mothers of Plaza de Mayo (Argentina) (El Perro en la Luna); Mom & Clarinet (South Korea) (KBS/Upright Media); My Son the Jihadi (United Kingdom) (True Vision Productions)
Best Actor	Best Actress
Dustin Hoffman in Roald Dahl's Esio Trot (United Kingdom) (Endor Productions/Red Arrow Films); Alexandre Nero in Rules of The Game (Brazil) (Rede Globo); Florian Stetter in Nackt Unter Wölfen (Germany) (UFA Fiction/ARD Degeto); James Wen in Echoes of Time (Singapore) (Ochre Pictures)	Christiane Paul in Unterm Radar (Germany) (Enigma Film/WDR/ARD); Judi Dench in Roald Dahl's Esio Trot (United Kingdom) (Endor Productions/Red Arrow Films); Jodi Sta. Maria in Pangako Sa 'Yo (Philippines) (ABS-CBN); Grazi Massafera in Hidden Truths (Brazil) (Rede Globo)
Best Non-English Language U.S. Primetime Program	Best Non-Scripted Entertainment
Francisco, El Jesuita (United States) (The History Channel/Telemundo/DirecTV); Asombrosamente (United States) (Fox/Nat Geo Mundo/Nativa Productions); La Banda (United States) (FremantleMedia/Syco/Univision/Saban); Un viaje con Fidel (United States) (CNN en Español)	The Great Swedish Adventure (Sweden) (Meter Television/SVT); Adotada (Brazil) (Formata Produções/MTV); Gogglebox (United Kingdom) (Studio Lambert); I Can See Your Voice (South Korea) (CJ E&M/Signal)
