= 44th Emmy Awards =

44th Emmy Awards may refer to:

- 44th Primetime Emmy Awards, held in 1992
- 44th Daytime Emmy Awards, held in 2017
- 44th International Emmy Awards, held in 2016
