= Ramses (TV series) =

- Genre: Biography; Drama; Music
- Written by: Marnie Blok
- Directed by: Michiel van Erp
- Starring: Maarten Heijmans; Thomas Cammaert; Noortje Herlaar; Hanne Arendzen
- Country of origin: Netherlands
- Original language: Dutch
- No. of seasons: 1
- No. of episodes: 4

Production
- Production company: De Familie

Original release
- Network: AVRO
- Release: 14 January – 1 February 2014

Ramses is a Dutch miniseries directed by Michiel van Erp with script written by Marnie Blok. Starring Maarten Heijmans in the role of Ramses Shaffy.

== Plot ==
A chronicle of legendary Dutch singer Ramses Shaffy's rise to fame, from his early days as a stage actor in late 1950s Amsterdam to his emergence as a national music icon throughout the following two decades.

== Cast ==
- Maarten Heijmans ... Ramses Shaffy
- Thomas Cammaert ... Joop Admiraal
- Noortje Herlaar ... Liesbeth List
- Hanne Arendzen ... Maria
- Bert Hana ... Klaas de Wit
- Xander van Vledder ... Cees Nooteboom
- Jim Deddes ... Herman
- Floris Verbeij ... Paul
- Daniel Verbaan ... Daan

== Awards ==
| Year | Awards | Category | Result |
|---|---|---|---|
| 2015 | 43rd International Emmy Awards | Best Performance by an Actor (Maarten Heijmans) | Won |
