= Gabo: The Creation of Gabriel Garcia Marquez =

2015 film

- Directed by: Justin Webster
- Production company: Caracol Televisión
- Release date: March 24, 2015 (Colombian Film Festival)
- Country: Colombia
- Languages: Spanish; English

Gabo: The Creation of Gabriel Garcia Marquez (also known as Gabo, The Magic of Reality) is a 2015 Colombian documentary directed by Justin Webster about the life story of award-winning writer Gabriel García Márquez.

== Awards ==
Year	Awards	Category	Result
2016	44th International Emmy Awards	Arts Programming	Nominated
2016	Gaudí Awards	Best Documentary	Nominated
