= Liesbeth List =

Dutch singer (1941–2020)

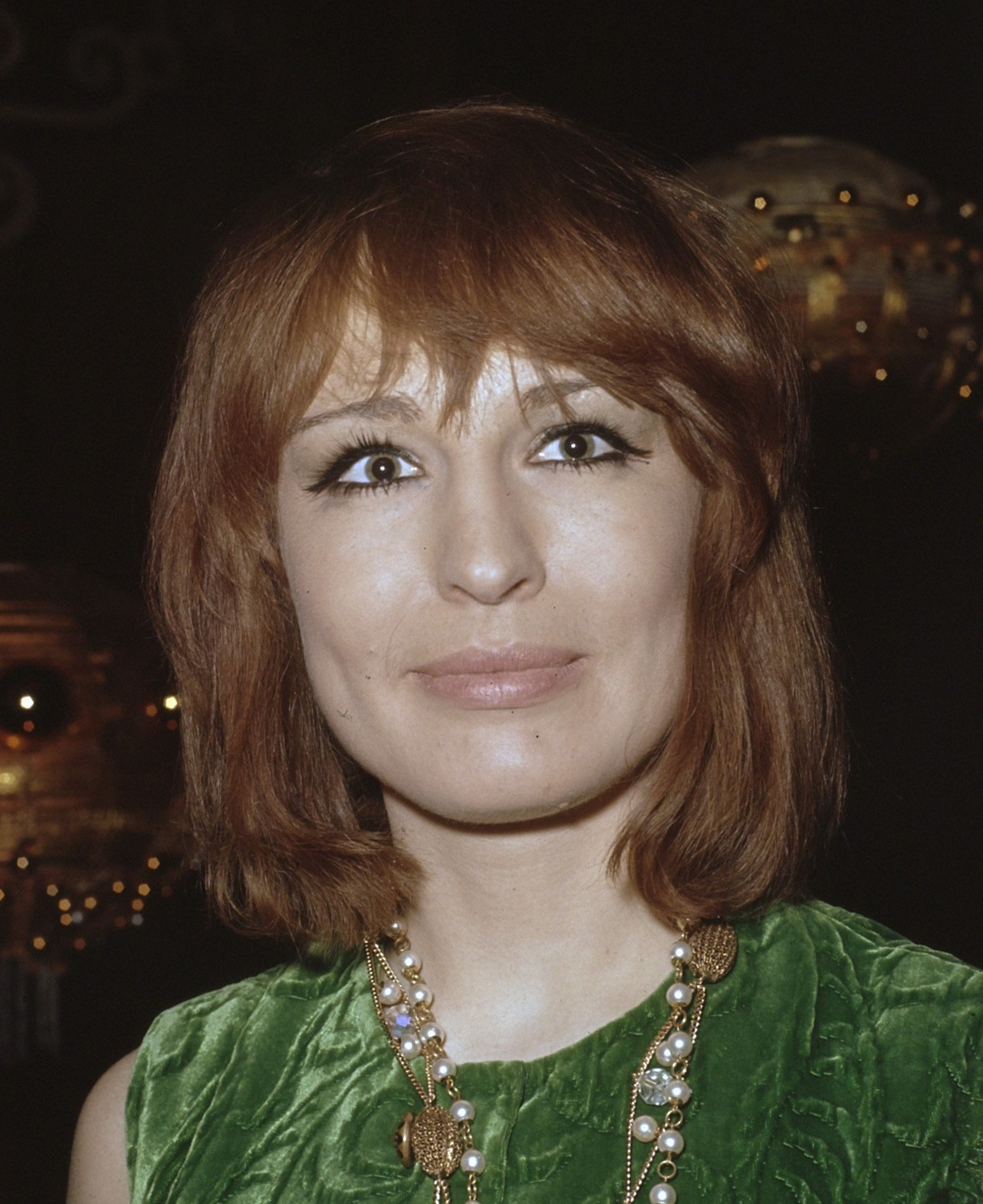
- List in 1964

Background information
- Born: Elisabeth Dorathea Driessen; 12 December 1941; Bandoeng, Dutch East Indies
- Origin: Netherlands
- Died: 25 March 2020 (aged 78) Soest, Netherlands
- Genres: Chanson, pop
- Occupation: Singer
- Years active: 1962–2012

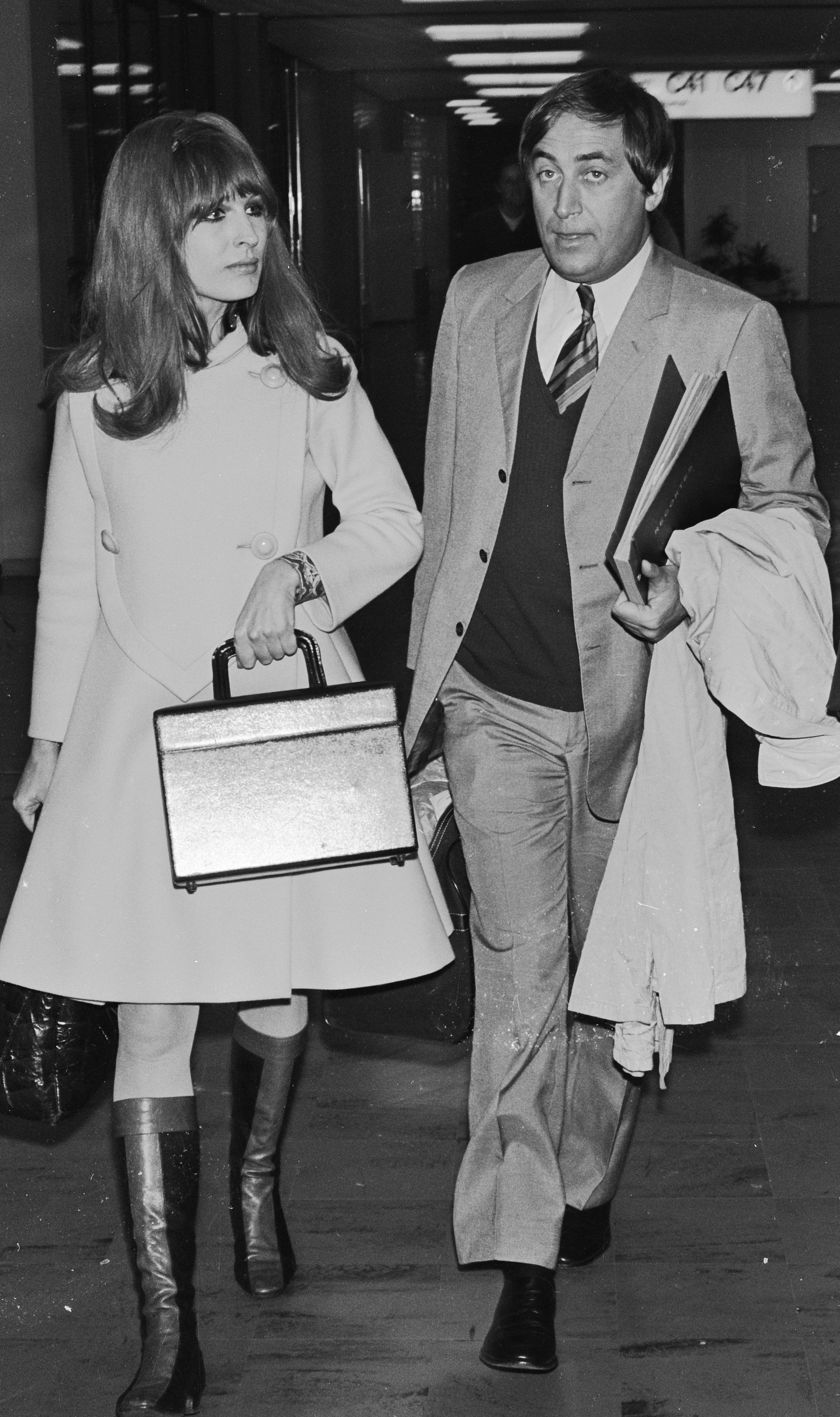
List with her longtime partner, writer Cees Nooteboom, in 1967

Elisabeth Dorathea "Liesbeth" List (born Driessen; 12 December 1941 – 25 March 2020) was a Dutch singer. She became popular during the 1960s and frequently collaborated with Ramses Shaffy. She also sang Jacques Brel's chansons in Dutch translation.

== Biography ==
=== Early life ===
List was born in Bandoeng, Dutch East Indies (present-day Indonesia), as Elisabeth "Elly" Dorathea Driessen. Her parents were separated in 1942 when during the Japanese occupation of the Dutch East Indies, her father was forced to work in coal mines. Elly and her mother were sent to one of the many camps set up exclusively to imprison Dutch occupants of Indonesia; such camps were known under the Dutch nickname "jappenkamp" (Jap-Camp). The circumstances in which Elly and her mother lived in the camp were very hard on her mother, who developed depression. When the Japanese capitulated at the end of WWII Elly and her mother were set free. They were reunited with their father and husband, but a few weeks later, Elly's mother committed suicide.

Elly and her father returned to the Netherlands, where her father remarried. His new wife, however, frequently clashed with Elly. At the age of seven, children's services took Elly away. It was thought her father was deceased, and she was placed in an orphanage. After it was revealed her father was still alive, she was placed back with her father and stepmother.

In 1948, during a trip to the Dutch island of Vlieland, Elly's stepmother was told that the owner of a hotel on Vlieland and his wife were seeking to adopt a child. Elly was subsequently given up by her father and adopted by this couple, whose surname was List.

=== 1958–1968: television, theatre and music ===
As a teenager, List was very interested in culture and music. At age 18, in 1959 she moved to Amsterdam, where she studied fashion and had a job as a secretary. She appeared in the AVRO talent show "Nieuwe Oogst", after which she was signed to collaborate with legendary Dutch singer Ramses Shaffy (1933–2009) in the theatre show Shaffy Chantant. They first started this show, in which they performed well-known chansons, in 1964. In 1965, the duo was awarded the Europe Cup for Best Singing Performance in Knokke, Belgium. This caused List to focus on a musical career and she released her debut album in 1966. In 1967, Mikis Theodorakis asked her to collaborate on an LP of his Mauthausen Ballad, describing the persecution of Jews during the Second World War in dramatic chansons. The LP was a critical and commercial success. List was also successful with an LP containing cover versions of songs by Jacques Brel: the LP was certified gold.

=== 1969–1990: expanded career ===
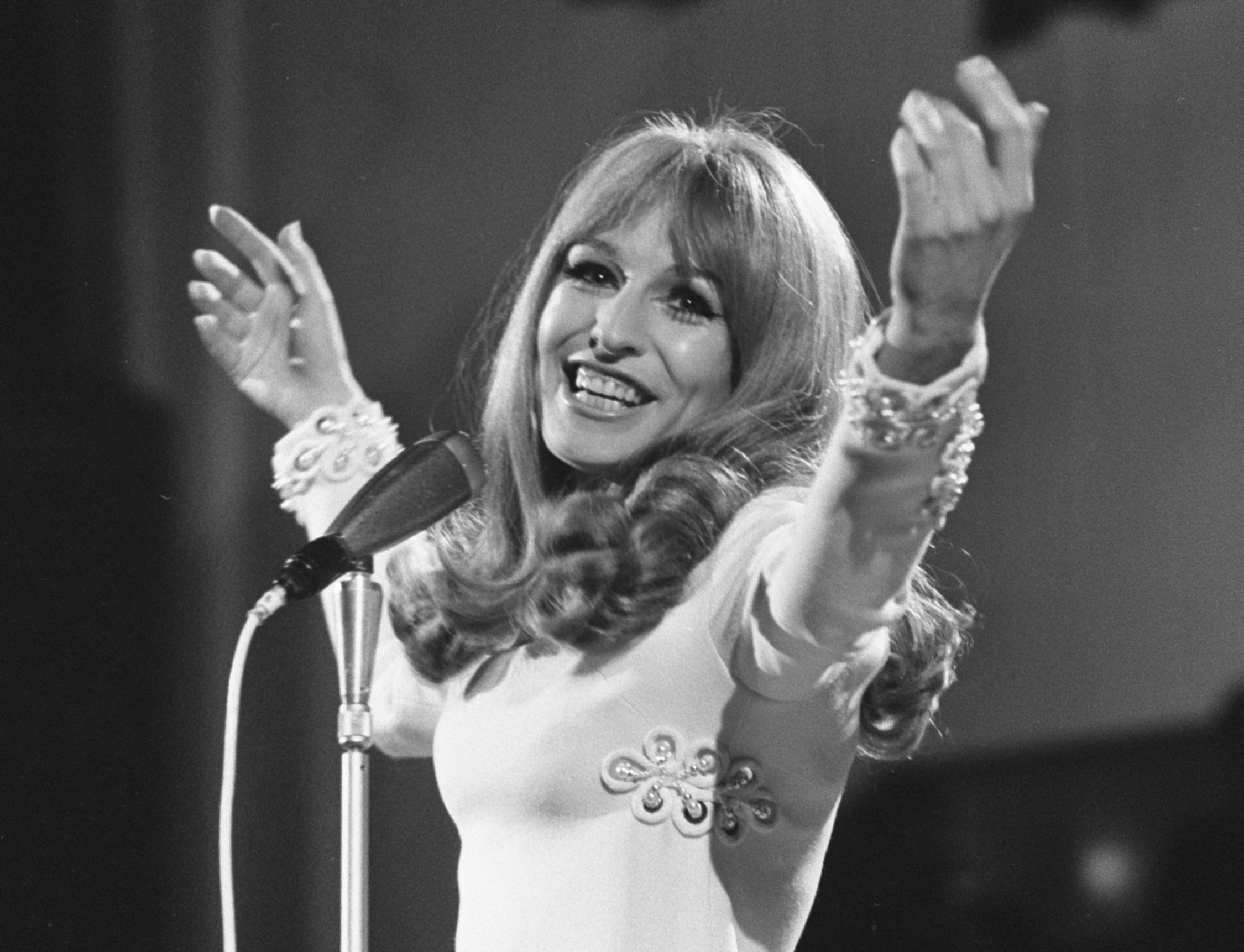
List performing in 1970

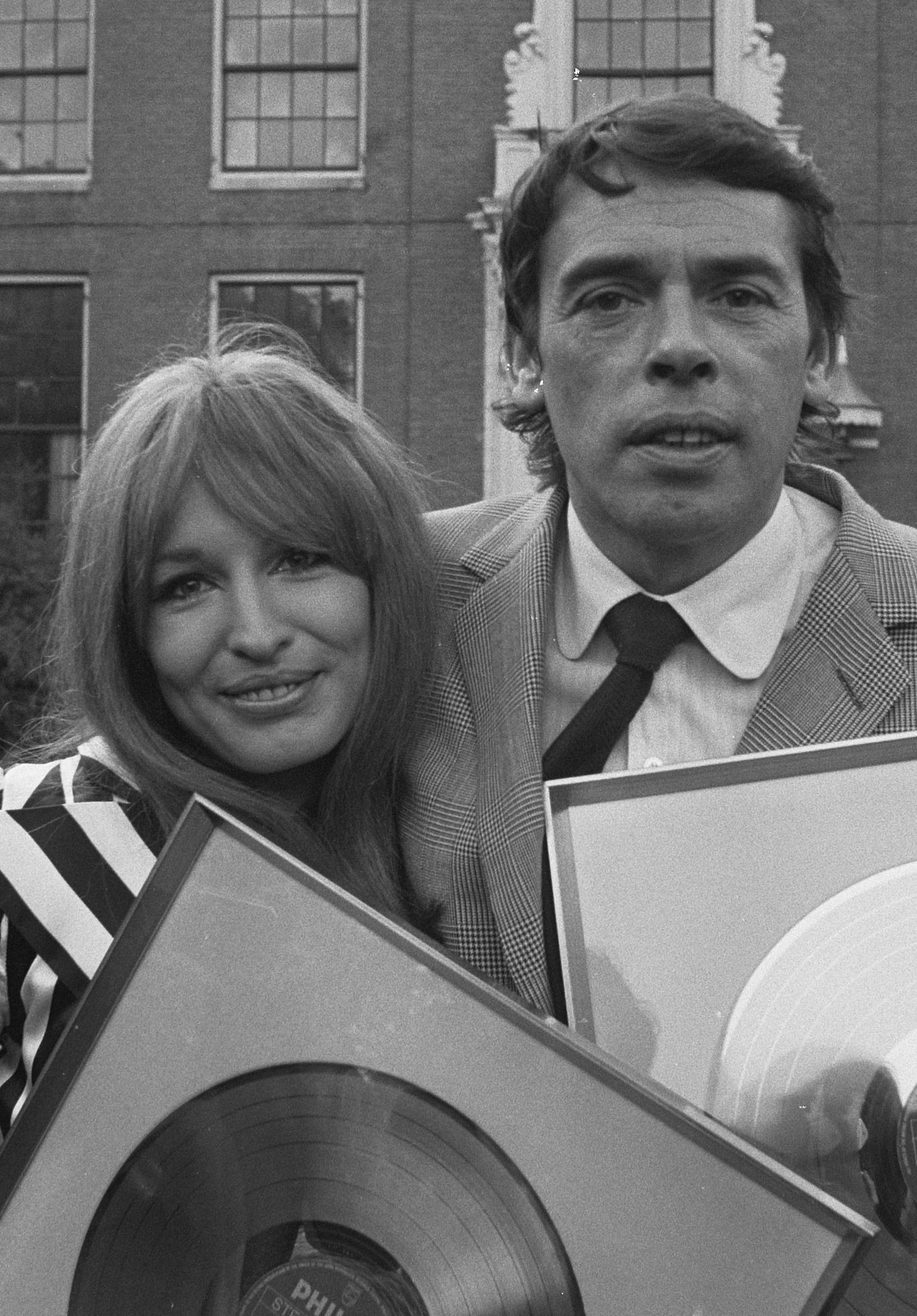
List with poet and singer Jacques Brel when she received a Gold record for her LP with Brel's songs translated to Dutch.

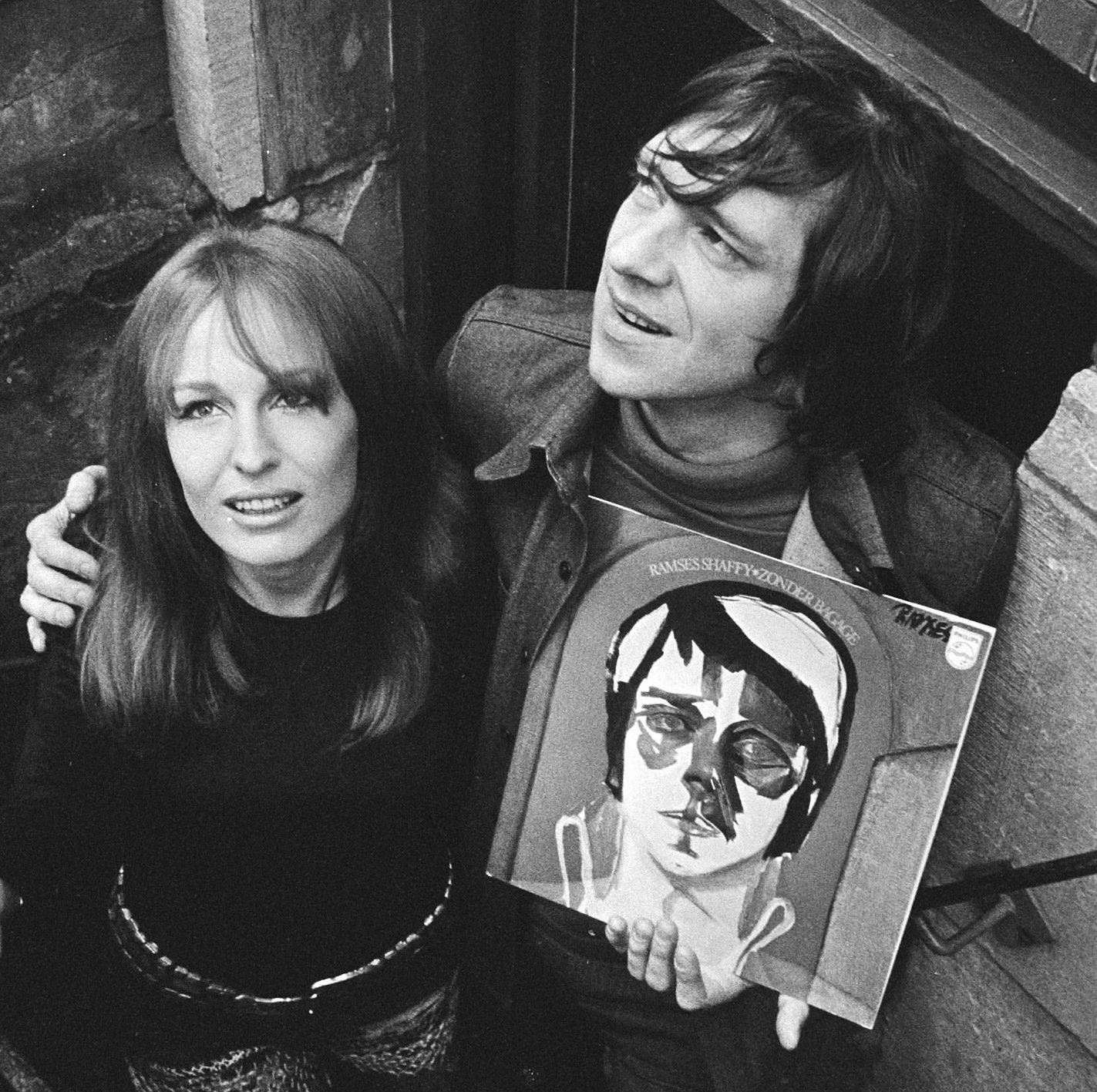
List with Ramses Shaffy presenting his LP Zonder Bagage in 1971

In 1969, List was awarded a press prize at a television festival in Montreux. The prize was awarded to her for her contribution in a television series. Because of this foreign acclaim, List focused more on international success. She started recording more cover versions of well-known artists, such as Gilbert Bécaud. List's success continued with the release of more LPs and a continued acting career in television, film, and stage. In 1972 she recorded an album with the American singer, songwriter Rod McKuen: 'Two against the morning'. In 1973 she recorded the album 'Meet lovely Liesbeth List' in England. Her album: 'Liesbeth List sings Jacques Brel' was released in 1972 in the USA. In 1976 she recorded an album with songs of Charles Aznavour 'Charles Aznavour presents: Liesbeth List'. She sang with him the duet: 'Don't say a word.'

List took a short break when she became pregnant with her first child; she and husband Robert Braaksma had a daughter, Elisah, in 1983, when List was 41. List ceased her activities for six years to care for her child. In 1988, List made her return to the public eye, starring in a theatre programme titled "List NU". In 1990, she started on a similar show, but it gained neither critical nor commercial success, therefore List accepted that her career had ended.

=== 1991–2020 ===
In the 90s singer, songwriter and producer Frank Boeijen revived List's career. She recorded two albums with him: in 1994 List and in 1996 Noach. In 1995 she received an Edison for the first, which is one of the highest musical honors awarded in The Netherlands. In 1999 she released Vergezicht which contains the song Heb Het Leven Lief (Love life) which she sang in 2007 at the memorial celebration for Jos Brink, with whom she had performed in a musical Het Hemelbed to great acclaim. She was also approached by Albert Verlinde to star in his musical about Edith Piaf's life. She started this in 1999 and did 170 shows of Piaf, de Musical. Because of its success, and the many requests to bring the musical back, she reprised the role during 2008 and 2009. In 2000 and in 2009, she won the coveted John Kraaijkamp Musical Award for this role. In 2009 she released a new CD called Verloren & Gewonnen. In 2015, she released what would be her last album, a tribute album to Ramses Shaffy titled Echo, which contained covers of songs by Shaffy.

In 2017, List decided to retire from music because she was developing dementia due to brain damage she had sustained in a car accident earlier in life. She died in her sleep on 25 March 2020, after spending the last years of her life in an assisted-living facility.

== Discography ==
- Liesbeth List (1966)
- Liesbeth List Sings Theodorakis (1967)
- Pastorale (1968)
- Zingt Jacques Brel (1969)
- Victoria (1970)
- Neuremberger Droom (1971)
- Two Against the Morning (1972)
- Meet lovely Liesbeth List (1973)
- Foto (1974)
- Samen (with Ramses Shaffy) (1976)
- Charles Aznavour presents: Liesbeth List (1976)
- Madame Melancholie (1977)
- Meisjes van Dertig (1979)
- Voor vanavond en daarna (1982)
- List (1994)
- Noach (1996)
- Vergezicht (1999)
- Van Shaffy tot Piaf (2001)
- Heb het leven lief (2001)
- Portret (2002)
- Carré Vedetten Gala (2006)
- Verloren en Gewonnen (2009)
- Echo (2015)
- Voor Altijd (2022)

== Bibliography ==
- Verburg, Alex Het voorlopige leven van Liesbeth List, published by Archipel 2001, ISBN 90-6305-010-0 (Dutch language)
- Verburg, Alex Intiem. De herinneringen van Liesbeth List, published by Witsand/ Archipel, 2010, ISBN 90-6305-574-9 (Dutch language)
- Dave Boomkens, Liesbeth List, de dochter van de vuurtorenwachter, published by Luitingh-Sijthoff, 2017. ISBN 978-90-245-7567-1 (Dutch language)
