= War of Lies =

2014 film

- Film poster
- German: Krieg der Lügen
- Directed by: Matthias Bittner
- Starring: Rafed Aljanabi
- Music by: Philipp Kobilke
- Country of origin: Germany
- Original languages: German; English

Production
- Cinematography: Julia Schlingmann
- Editor: Friedemann Schmidt
- Running time: 88 minutes

Original release
- Release: 22 November 2014

War of Lies (German: Krieg der Lügen) is a 2014 German documentary directed by Matthias Bittner.

== Plot ==
War of Lies is the story of an Iraqi refugee, whose information about portable weapons of mass destruction passed through the hands of the BND, MI6 and CIA. This information was ultimately used by the US government to legitimize the invasion of Iraq in 2003. Today we know the war was based on a lie.

== Awards ==
| Year | Award | Category | Nominated | Result |
|---|---|---|---|---|
| 2016 | 44th International Emmy Awards | Best documentary | Krieg der Lügen | Won |
