= Vertige de la chute =

- Written by: Vincent Rimbaux
- Directed by: Vincent Rimbaux; Patrizia Landi
- Starring: Ballet Company of Rio de Janeiro
- Countries of origin: France; Brazil
- Original language: Portuguese

Production
- Producer: Stéphanie Lebrun
- Running time: 86 minutes
- Production companies: Babel Doc; France Télévisions; Cafeína Produções

Original release
- Network: Canal Brasil
- Release: 2018

Vertige de la chute (also known as: Ressaca) is a 2018 French-Brazilian documentary directed by Vincent Rimbaux and Patrizia Landi, and produced by Babel Doc and Stéphanie Lebrun. The film addresses the struggle of employees of the Municipal Theater of Rio de Janeiro in the midst of the state's economic and political crisis. Stéphanie Lebrun and the production team won an International Emmy Award for it in 2020 in the Arts Programming category.

Ressaca was aired on Canal Brasil on May 24, 2021, and is available on the Globoplay streaming platform.

== Synopsis ==
Shot entirely in black and white, the documentary tells the daily lives of professionals at the Municipal Theater of Rio de Janeiro in 2017, when then-governor Luiz Fernando Pezão suspended the salaries of the institution's employees.

== Accolades ==
Year	Award	Category	Recipient	Result
2019	Festival do Rio	Best Documentary Direction	Vincent Rimbaux e Patrizia Landi	Won
2019	Festival do Rio	Best Documentary	Vertige de la chute	Won
2020	48th International Emmy Awards	Best Arts Programming	Vertige de la chute	Won
