= Miners Shot Down =

- Directed by: Rehad Desai
- Screenplay by: Rehad Desai; Anita Khanna
- Produced by: Rehad Desai; Anita Khanna
- Release date: 1 May 2014
- Country: South Africa

Miners Shot Down is a 2014 South African documentary film directed by Rehad Desai. This film explores the events that led to what was called the "Marikana Massacre". In 2015, the film won an International Emmy.
