= Ramses Shaffy =

Dutch singer and actor (1933–2009)

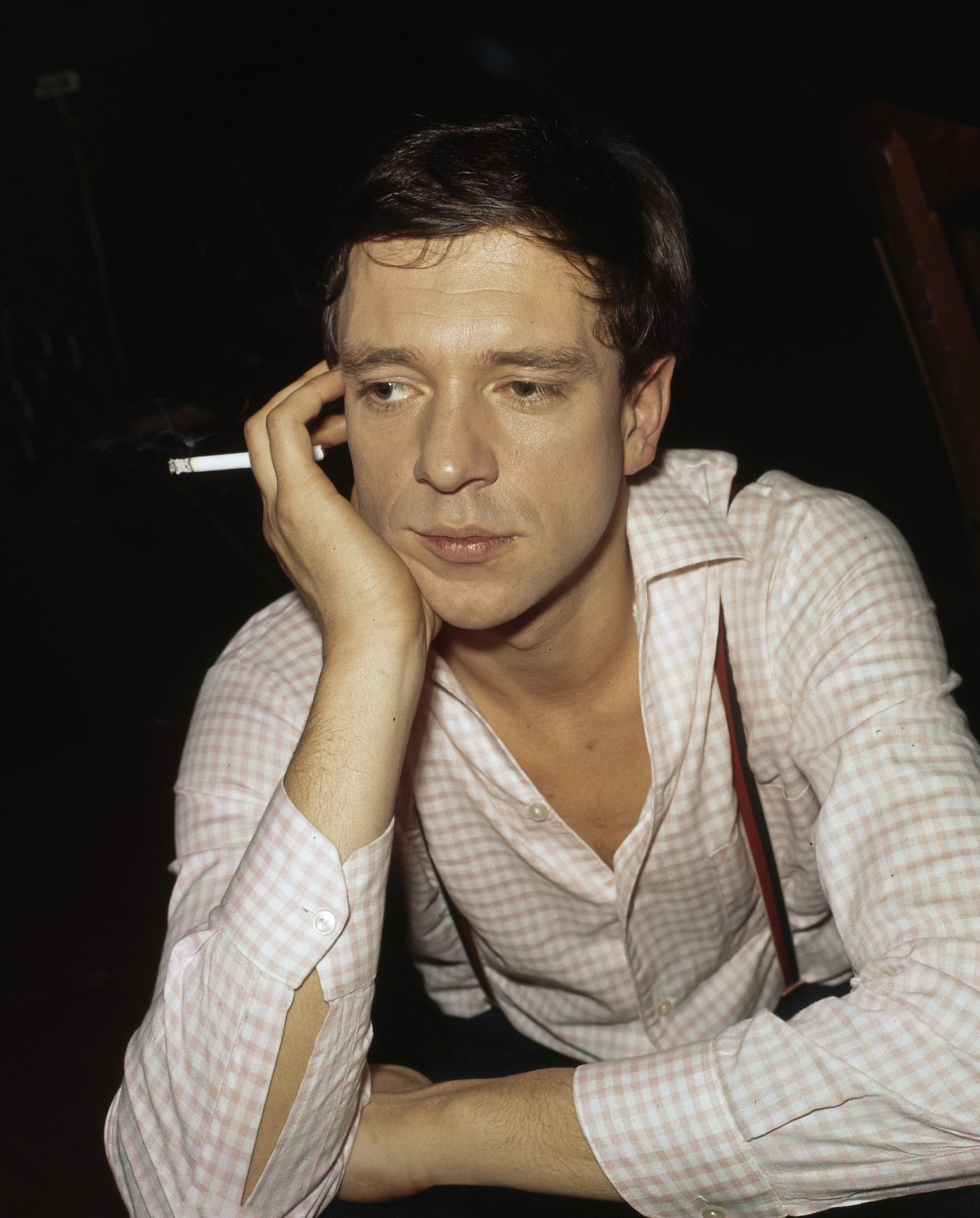
- Shaffy in 1965

Background information
- Also known as: Didi
- Born: Ramses II Shaffy; 29 August 1933; Neuilly-sur-Seine, France
- Died: 1 December 2009 (aged 76) Amsterdam, Netherlands
- Genre: Chanson
- Occupations: Chanteur, musician, actor
- Instrument: Piano
- Years active: 1955–2009
- Label: PolyGram

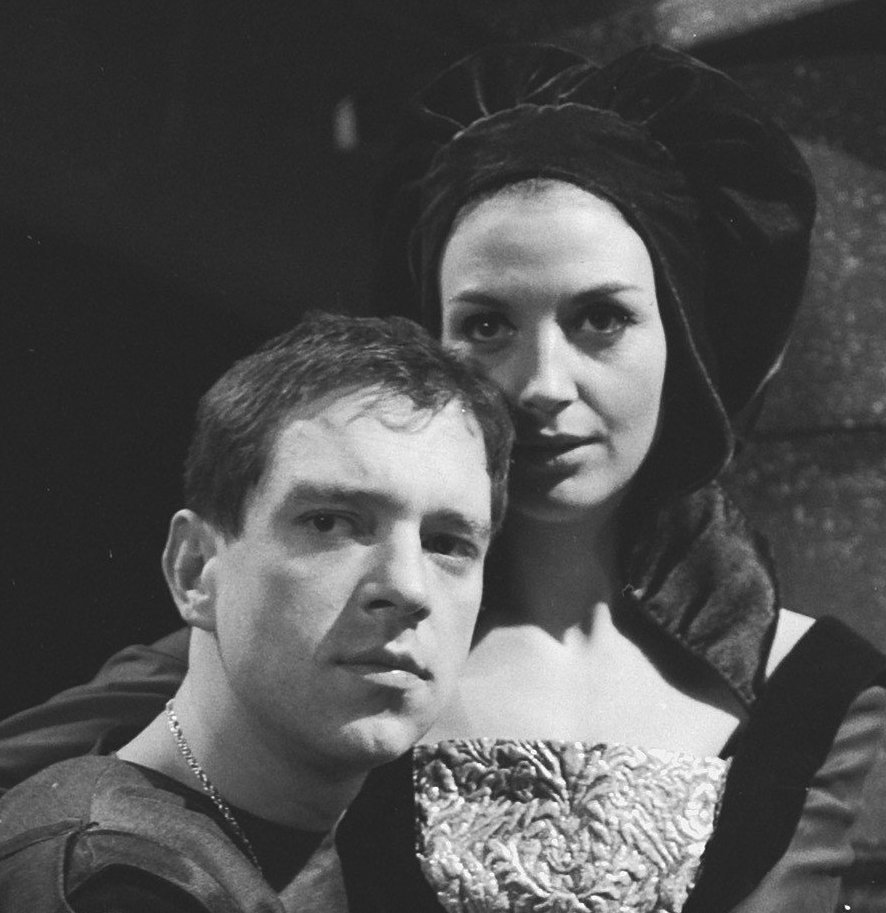
Shaffy as an actor together with Kitty Courbois 1964

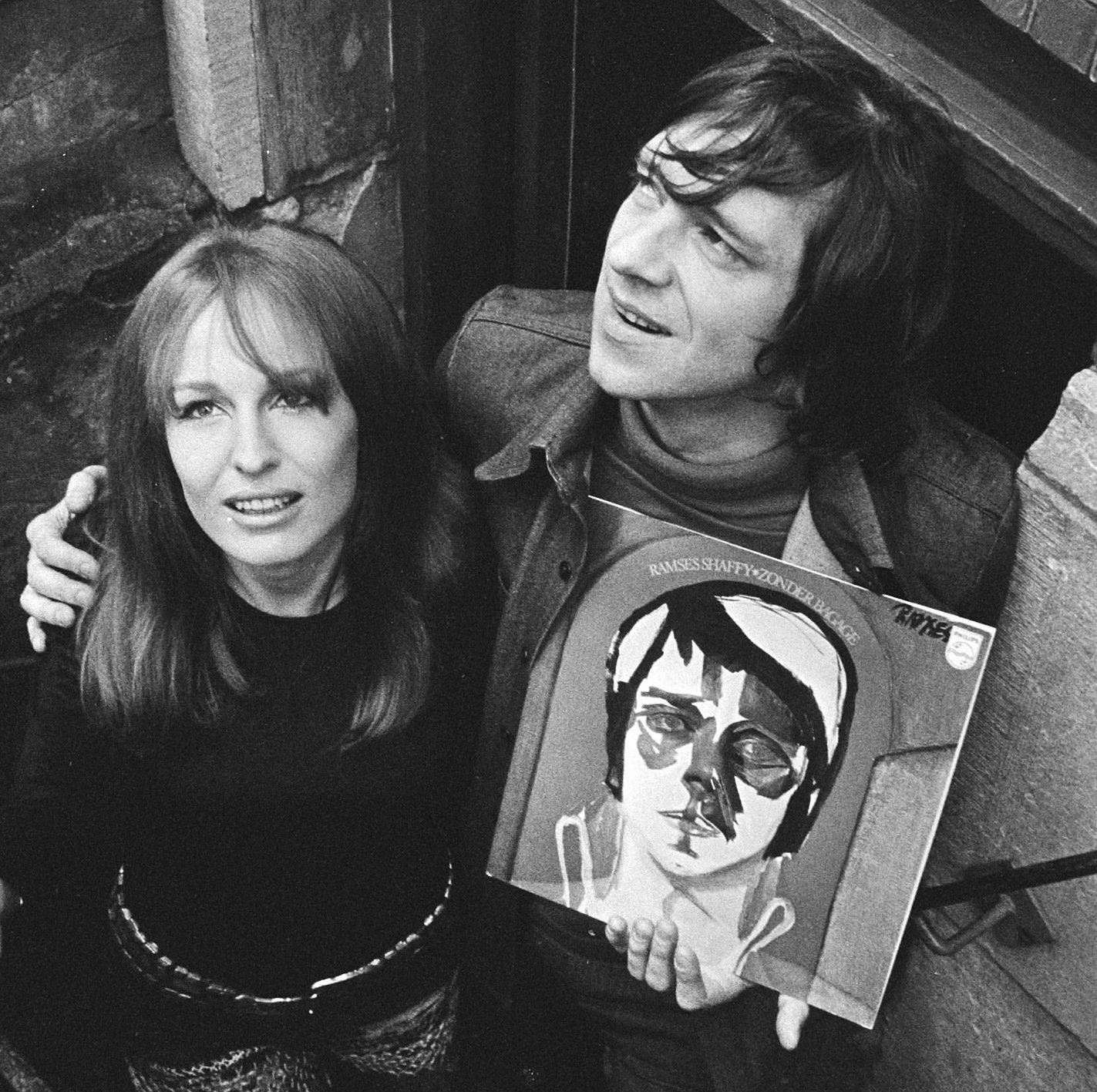
Shaffy with Liesbeth List in 1971, presenting his new LP Zonder bagage

Ramses Shaffy (29 August 1933 – 1 December 2009) was a Dutch singer and actor who became popular during the 1960s. His most famous songs include "Zing, vecht, huil, bid, lach, werk en bewonder", "We zullen doorgaan", "Pastorale", "Sammy" and "Laat me". He frequently collaborated with Dutch singer Liesbeth List.

== Biography ==
Shaffy was born on 29 August 1933 in Paris, in the suburb Neuilly-sur-Seine. His father was the Egyptian diplomat Ramsès Shaffy Bey, and his mother was the Polish-Russian countess Alexandra de Wysocka. He grew up with his mother in Cannes. When she was infected with tuberculosis, Shaffy was sent to an aunt in Utrecht. Eventually, he ended up with a foster family in Leiden.

He did not finish high school, but he was accepted at the Amsterdam School of Theatre Arts in 1952. In 1955, he made his debut with the Nederlandse Comedie. He went to Rome in 1960 aspiring to be a film actor, but was unsuccessful in the endeavour. In the 1960s, Shaffy had a relationship with Dutch actor Joop Admiraal (1937–2006). In 1964 he founded Shaffy Chantant, a theatre group, which led to his first collaborations with chanteuse Liesbeth List. He worked with Dutch pianist Louis van Dijk. Among others, musician Thijs van Leer was a member of the group for a short period of time. With Liesbeth List, Shaffy recorded the classic song "Pastorale" (Sun and Moon). His hit song "We zullen doorgaan" was parodied by comedian André van Duin in 1975.

He temporarily stopped his habit of heavy drinking when he became a member of the Rajneesh movement in the 1980s.

In the 1980s, Shaffy returned to the stage and the set as an actor. He played Don Quixote in the musical De man van La Mancha in 1993. He also played the role of Count of Egmont in the Flemish/Dutch miniseries Willem van Oranje. Pieter Fleury made a documentary about Shaffy in 2002, titled Ramses. It won a Golden Calf, the award of the Netherlands Film Festival. The film shows Shaffy's life in a rest home in Amsterdam. He had to move to a rest home, suffering from Korsakoff-like symptoms, caused by heavy alcohol use.

Shaffy's condition slightly improved in the years following the film. His memory improved and he sometimes made public appearances again. In the fall of 2005, he re-recorded his 1978 hit song "Laat me", together with List and the band Alderliefste, which became a minor hit.

== Death ==
On 5 May 2009 it was made public that Shaffy suffered from esophageal cancer. He died of the disease in the Dr. Sarphati House, Amsterdam, where he had lived the last seven years, on 1 December 2009, aged 76. A public memorial service was held at the Royal Carré Theatre in Amsterdam.

== Portrayal ==
In 2014, a four-part drama series about the young Ramses Shaffy titled Ramses was produced by the AVRO for Dutch television. Actor Maarten Heijmans portrayed Shaffy.

The municipal artwork in Vijzelgracht metro station, Amsterdam is a highly stylised transit map which portrays events in Shaffy's life.

== Accolades ==
- In 2002, Ramses Shaffy received a Knighthood of the Order of the Dutch Lion.
- On 23 June 2017, the Ramses Shaffy Home (residential space for artists) was opened in Amsterdam.

== Discography ==
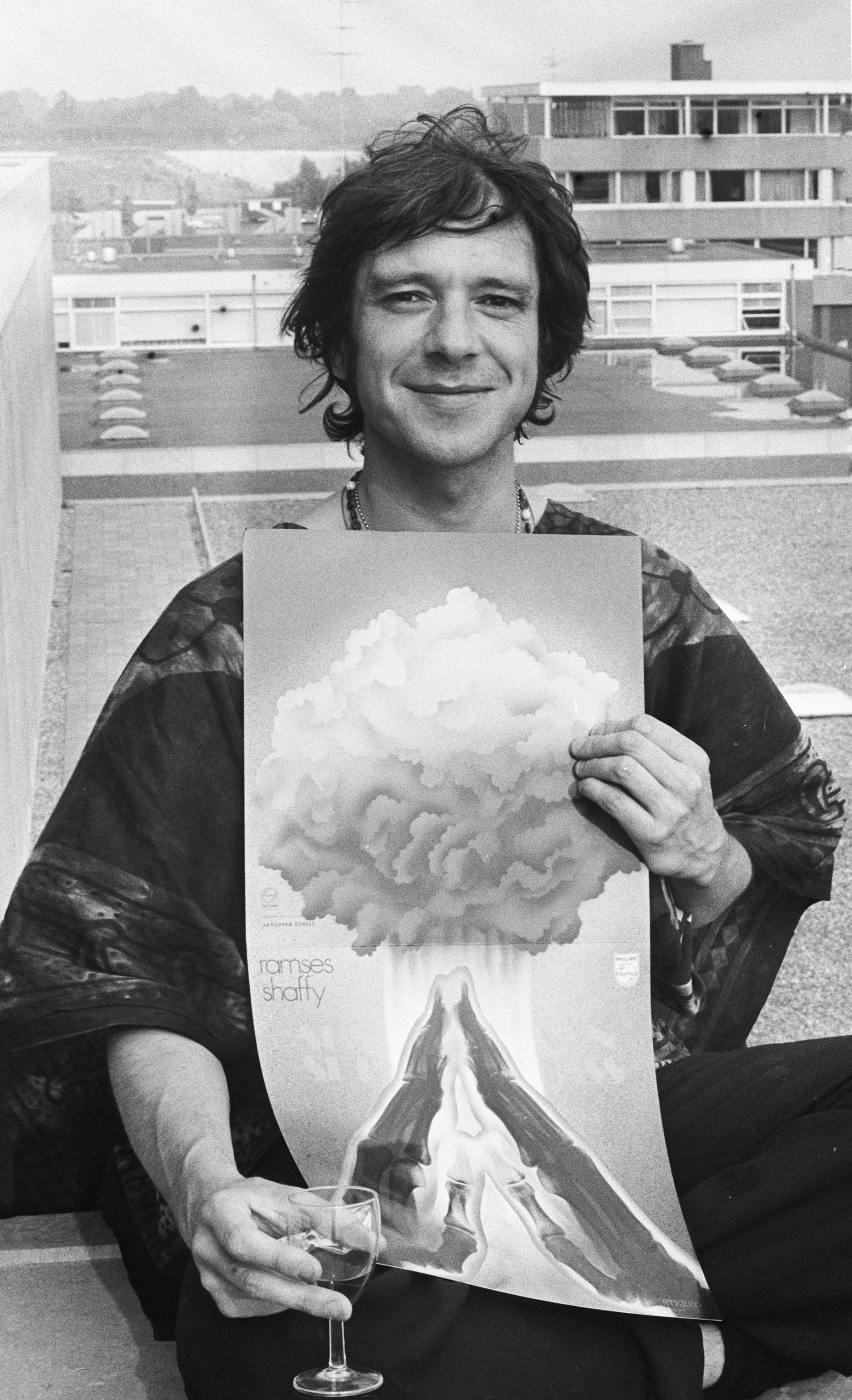
Shaffy in 1970 with a sleeve for album Sunset Sunkiss

- Shaffy Chantant (1966)
- Ramses II (1966)
- Shaffy Chantate (1967)
- Sunset Sunkiss (1970)
- Zonder bagage (1971)
- We zullen doorgaan (1972)
- We leven nog (1975)
- Samen (1976, with Liesbeth List)
- Ramses en Liesbeth live (1977, with Liesbeth List)
- Dag en nacht (1978)
- Live (1980)
- Sterven van geluk (1988)
