= Responsible Child =

- Films release poster
- Directed by: Nick Holt
- Written by: Sean Buckley
- Starring: Billy Barratt; James Tarpey; Tom Burke
- Cinematography: Nick Cooke
- Edited by: Matthew Gray
- Production companies: Kudos Film; 72 Films
- Distributed by: BBC Two
- Release date: 12 December 2019
- Running time: 86 minutes
- Country: United Kingdom
- Language: English

Responsible Child is a 2019 British television film directed by Nick Holt and written by Sean Buckley. The film is based on a true story and stars Billy Barratt in the role of Ray, a 12-year-old boy who goes to trial accused of killing his mother's boyfriend. It was produced by Kudos with 72 Films for BBC Two.

At the 48th International Emmy Awards, 13-year-old Barratt won the Award for Best Actor, becoming the youngest person to win an International Emmy.

== Premise ==
Ray, a 12 year old boy, finds himself standing trial for murder. Told in two time frames, the film follows both the events that led up to the murder, and the unfolding drama of the trial. Ray and his adult older brother Nathan are arrested after together killing their mother’s partner and, with the age of Criminal Responsibility in England currently set at ten years old, Ray must stand trial in adult court alongside his brother.

== Cast ==
- Billy Barratt as Rafael "Ray" McCullin, a 12 year old boy accused of killing his step-father along with his brother, Nathan.
- James Tarpey as Nathan McCullin, Ray's older brother.
- Owen McDonnell as Pete, a solicitor assigned to Ray's case.
- Michelle Fairley as Kerry, a barrister assigned to Ray's case.
- Tom Burke as William Ramsden, the prosecutor.
- Debbie Honeywood as Veronica, Ray and Nathan's mother.
- Shaun Dingwall as Scott, Ray and Nathan's abusive step-father.
- Kirsten Wright and Zachary Barnfield as Serena and Christie, Ray's younger brother and sister.
- Stephen Campbell Moore as Dr Johann Keaton, a psychiatrist assigned to Ray's case.
- Angela Wynter as Grace
- Matthew Aubrey as Gary
- Zita Sattar as Sam Delaney
- Stephen Boxer as Judge Walden

== Accolades ==
List of awards and nominations
Year	Award	Category	Nominated	Result	Ref(s)
2020	48th International Emmy Awards	Best Performance by an Actor	Billy Barratt	Won	
2020	48th International Emmy Awards	Best TV Movie or Miniseries	Responsible Child	Won	
2020	BAFTA Awards	Best Single Drama	Responsible Child	Nominated	
