= Francisco, El Jesuita =

- Based on: El Jesuita: Conversaciones con el cardenal Jorge Bergoglio by Francesca Ambrogietti; Sergio Rubín
- Directed by: Matías Gueilburt
- Starring: Gustavo Yanniello
- Country of origin: United States
- Original language: Spanish
- No. of episodes: 4

Production
- Producers: Verónica Montali; Juana Maria Torres
- Running time: 180 minutes
- Production companies: Anima Films; The History Channel (Latin America); Telemundo; Claro-Video; DirecTV

Original release
- Network: Telemundo
- Release: September 13, 2015 – 2015

Francisco, El Jesuita is a 2015 American four-part television miniseries directed by Matthias Gueilburt and produced by Anima Films. The first episode debuted on Telemundo on September 13, 2015.

== Awards ==
| Year | Award | Category | Result |
|---|---|---|---|
| 2016 | 44th International Emmy Awards | Non-English Language U.S. Primetime Programs | Won |
