= The Man Who Saved the Louvre =

- Directed by: Jean-Pierre Devillers; Pierre Pochart
- Country of origin: France
- Original language: French

Production
- Production company: Ladybird Films

Original release
- Release: 2014

The Man Who Saved the Louvre (French: Illustre & Inconnu: Comment Jacques Jaujard a sauvé le Louvre, lit. 'Illustrious and Unknown: How Jacques Jaujard Saved the Louvre') is a 2014 French documentary film directed by Jean-Pierre Devillers and Pierre Pochart.

It's about how Louvre director Jacques Jaujard and his curators evacuated works of art before German occupation forces could seize them.
