= Billy Barratt =

English actor

- Born: 2006/2007 (age 18–19); London, England
- Occupation: Actor
- Years active: 2016–present
- Mother: Carolyn Owlett
- Relatives: Shakin' Stevens (grandfather)

Billy Barratt (born 2006 or 2007) is an English actor. He became the youngest winner of the International Emmy Award for Best Actor at the age of 13 for his role in the television film Responsible Child (2019). His films since include Bring Her Back (2025). On television, he is known for his roles in the Apple TV series Invasion (2021–present) and the ITV series Gone (2026).

== Early life and education ==
Billy Barratt was born in the Brixton area of London, the son of record engineer Dean James Barratt and singer and actress Carolyn Owlett and the paternal grandson of Welsh singer Shakin' Stevens.

He attended Sylvia Young Theatre School from the age of 11.

== Career ==
Barratt made his film debut in To Dream (2016) and later played a street urchin in Mary Poppins Returns (2018).

He starred as Ray in Responsible Child (2019), for which he became the youngest winner of the International Emmy Award for Best Actor at the age of 13.

In June 2026, he was cast as Nathan Prescott in Life Is Strange, a television adaptation of the adventure game series. In September 2026, it was announced that Barratt had been cast as Tom Riddle in the second season of the Harry Potter television adaptation.

== Filmography ==
=== Film ===
Key
†	Denotes films that have not yet been released

Year	Title	Role	Notes
2016	To Dream	Young Luke	
2018	Mary Poppins Returns	Street urchin	
2019	Blinded by the Light	Young Matt	
2022	The Other Me	Niazi	
2023	Crater	Dylan	
2024	My Spy: The Eternal City	Ryan Kerr	
2024	Kraven the Hunter	Young Dmitri Smerdyakov	
2025	Bring Her Back	Andy	
2026	Storm Rider: Legend of Hammerhead	Young Neb	
TBA	The Chaperones †		Post-production

=== Television ===
Key
†	Denotes television productions that have not yet been released

Year	Title	Role	Notes
2016	Mr Selfridge	Ralph Selfridge	4 episodes
2017	The White Princess	Prince Arthur	4 episodes
2017	Sharknado 5: Global Swarming	Gil	Television film
2018	The Alienist	Ted Roosevelt Jr.	Episode: "Castle in the Sky"
2019	Responsible Child	Ray	Television film
2019	A Christmas Carol	Young Scrooge	1 episode
2021–present	Invasion	Caspar Morrow	Main role
2026	Gone	Dylan Sedgwick	Main role
TBA	Life Is Strange †	Nathan Prescott	Main role
TBA	Harry Potter †	Tom Riddle	Guest role (season 2)
