= Un viaje con Fidel =

Un viaje con Fidel (English: A Trip with Fidel) is a 2015 documentary and original production for CNN en Español's DocuFilms. It was directed by Eduardo Suárez. The documentary premiered on 8 November 2015 on CNN en Español. It was nominated for an International Emmy Award in 2016.

== Synopsis ==
The documentary follows the story of Jon Alpert's 1979 trip with Cuban politician Fidel Castro. Fidel had granted Alpert permission to accompany him on his plane trip to the United Nations, where he was expected to give a speech as the president of the non-aligned countries. Alpert, a young journalist with experience reporting on Cuban affairs, had expected to use the material for a piece with his employer at the time, NBC, only for the piece to never air, something that Suárez claims was done due to NBC not wanting to show Castro as a charismatic person.

Castro allowed Alpert access to both himself and his private rooms during the entirety of his trip, something that he had not previously granted to any journalists from North America. Alpert later stated that he was initially extremely nervous but grew more comfortable around Castro.
