= Arrepentidos =

Arrepentidos is an American television series directed by Lilo Vilaplana for Nat Geo Mundo. The series won an International Emmy.
