= Asombrosamente =

American television series

- Starring: Aleks Syntek; Sebastián Martínez
- Country of origin: United States
- Original language: Spanish
- No. of episodes: 10

Production
- Running time: 30 minutes
- Production companies: Fox Networks Group Latin America National Geographic Channels Latin America; Nativa Productions

Original release
- Network: NatGeo Mundo

Asombrosamente (Spanish for "amazingly" or "astonishingly") is a 2015 American television series produced and aired by Nat Geo Mundo. The series, starring Mexican musician Aleks Syntek is composed of 10 half-hour episodes that explains the brain's functioning in daily activities.
