= Maarten Heijmans =

Dutch actor (born 1983)

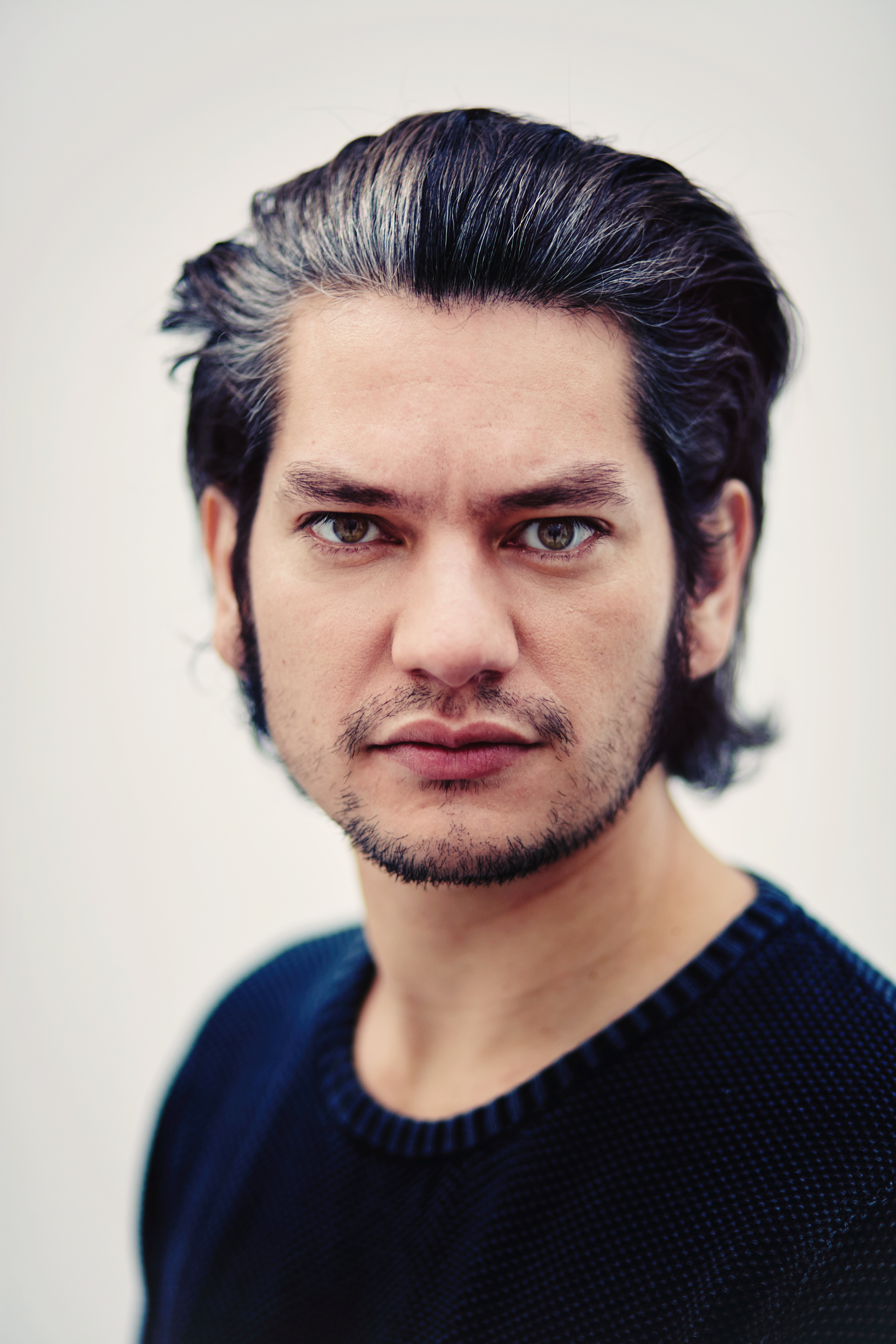
- Born: Maarten Henri Lajos Heijmans; 24 December 1983 (age 42); Amsterdam, Netherlands
- Occupation: Actor

Maarten Henri Lajos Heijmans (born 24 December 1983 in Amsterdam) is a Dutch Emmy-winning actor.

== Career ==
In 2007 he graduated from the Amsterdamse Toneelschool & Kleinkunstacademie (Amsterdam Theatre School & Kleinkunst Academy) where he studied Drama for four years. Since his graduation, Maarten has performed in several theatre plays and television shows.

In 2007 he and his former classmate Ian Bok made their own theatre-piece called De Huilende Kers (The Crying Cherry). That year they won the audience award at the ITS Festival (International Theatreschool Festival). In 2008 they won the Dioraphte Fringe Award at the Amsterdam Fringe Festival. In summer 2009, De Huilende Kers performed at the Prague Fringe Festival as well as the Dublin Fringe Festival.

Maarten is also a member of Dutch theatre-group, Circus Treurdier (which would translate roughly as "Circus of the sad animals"), a group of young performers who create and perform their own theatre shows.

== Filmography ==
=== Theatre ===
- Brundibar - Hans Krasa (1995)
- Oliver! - Lionel Bart (1998)
- The Good Person of Szechwan - Bertolt Brecht (2006)
- De Kleine Kapitein - Tom Sijtsma (2007)
- Arabische Nacht - Roland Schimmelpfennig (2007)
- Verplichte Figuren - Niek Barendsen (2008)
- Batte - Ad De Bont (2008)
- De Huilende Kers (2008)
- Op Hoop van Zegen (Herman Heijermans) (2009)
- Thaibox Verdriet - Ad De Bont (2010)
- De Wijze Kater - Herman Heijermans (2010)
- Expats - Peter Van De Witte (2011)
- Les Enfants du Paradis (2011)
- Heldenbrigade - Roel Adam (2011)
- Wienerwald - Ödön von Horváth (2012)
- Antigone - Jean Anouilh (2012)
- Soldier of Orange - Anton (2013)
- Vaslav - Arthur Japin (2014)
- Mary Stuart - Friedrich Schiller (2014)
- De Gelaarsde Poes - Don Duyns (2015)
- Een Klein Leven (2019)
- De Wetten - de Astroloog (2024)
- Hadestown (2025)

=== Television ===
- Ramses
- Het Klokhuis
- S1NGLE
- Spangas
- Koppels
- Tita Tovenaar
- Van der Valk (2020, S1:E3)
- Modern Love Amsterdam

=== Film ===
- Het woeden der gehele wereld (2006)
- Weg van jou (2017)
- Wat is dan liefde (2019)
