= International Emmy Award for Best Actress =

Annual film award

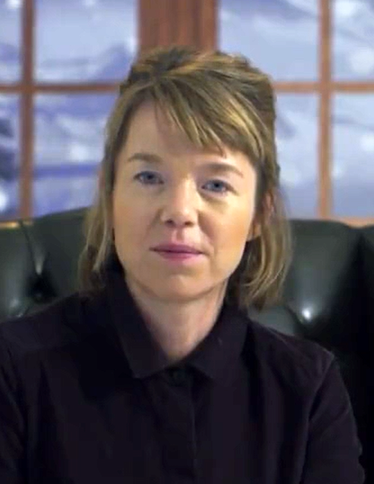
- The 2025 recipient: Anna Maxwell Martin
- Awarded for: Best Performance by an Actress
- Country: United States
- Presented by: International Academy of Television Arts and Sciences
- First award: November 21, 2005
- Currently held by: Anna Maxwell Martin, Until I Kill You (2025)

Highlights
- Most awards: Julie Walters, (2)
- Website: iemmys.tv/

The International Emmy Award for Best Performance by an Actress is presented annually by the International Academy of Television Arts & Sciences (IATAS). The award honors the best performance by an actress in a made-for-television fiction program (i.e., a movie, miniseries, drama series, telenovela, or comedy series).

Since its inception, the award has been given to twenty actresses. Anna Maxwell Martin is the current recipient, for her portrayal of Delia Balmer in Until I Kill You. Julie Walters holds the record for the most wins in this category, with two awards.

== Rules and Regulations ==
The International Emmy Award for Best Actress is awarded for a female performance in a made-for-television fiction program (which can be a television film, miniseries, drama series, telenovela, or comedy series). According to International Academy rules, only performances from programs entered into the competition are eligible.

The same actress may be submitted for different productions, as separate entries. More than one female performance from the same production may also be submitted.

To be eligible, a performer must appear in at least 10% of the total airtime of the submitted episode. If the performance is part of a series, only one episode must have had its first broadcast within the listed eligibility dates.

== History ==
The first actress to win the International Emmy was Chinese actress He Lin, for Slave Mother, a television film produced by the CCTV6 channel. In 2006, Dutch actress Maryam Hassouni won for her performance as Laila al Gatawi in Offers, a drama thriller directed by Dana Nechushtan.

In 2007, the International Emmy for Best Actress was awarded to French actress Muriel Robin for her role as Marie Besnard in the Belgian-French film The Poisoner.

British actresses Lucy Cohu, Julie Walters and Helena Bonham Carter won in subsequent years, with Walters being the only two-time winner—first in 2009 for her role as Anne Turner in A Short Stay in Switzerland, and again in 2011 for her performance in the biographical film Mo, which tells the life story of Labour Party politician Mo Mowlam.

The first Emmy for Best Actress awarded to a Latin American performer went to Argentina’s Cristina Banegas, for her role in the miniseries Televisión por la Inclusión, followed by Brazil’s Fernanda Montenegro in 2013.

In 2014, Dutch actress Bianca Krijgsman was honored for her performance in A New World, a film about a chance encounter between her character and an African refugee, which leads to an unexpected relationship. Norwegian actress Anneke von der Lippe won the 2015 Emmy for her role in Øyevitne, a noir thriller created and directed by Jarl Emsell Larsen. She had previously been nominated in 2005 for her performance in the miniseries Ved Kongens Bord, but lost to China’s He Lin that year.

In 2016, Christiane Paul won the Emmy for her portrayal of Elke Seeberg in Unterm Radar, a German television film based on a book by Henriette Bruegger. In the story, her character's daughter is suspected of participating in a terrorist attack in Berlin.

Anna Friel won her first Emmy in 2017 for her role as Marcella Backland in the British Nordic-noir drama series Marcella.

In 2018, Anna Schudt won for portraying comedian Gaby Köster in Ein Schnupfen hätte auch gereicht, a biopic based on Köster’s autobiography of the same name.

In 2019, Marina Gera won Hungary’s first International Emmy Award for her lead role in Eternal Winter.

== Winners and nominees ==
=== 2000s ===
Year	Recipient	Character	English title	Original title	Country
2005	He Lin	A'Xiu	Slave Mother	為奴隸的母親 / Wèi núlì de mǔqīn	China
2005	Anneke von der Lippe	Tove Steen	At the King's Table	Ved kongens bord	Norway
2005	Carolina Oliveira	Maria	Today is Maria's Day	Hoje É Dia de Maria	Brazil
2005	Catherine Tate	Multiple roles	The Catherine Tate Show		United Kingdom
2006	Maryam Hassouni	Laila al Gatawi	Offers		Netherlands
2006	Heike Makatsch	Margarete Steiff	Margarete Steiff		Germany
2006	Imelda Staunton	Louisa Durrell	My Family and Other Animals		United Kingdom
2006	Lucy Cohu	Princess Margaret	The Queen's Sister		United Kingdom
2007	Muriel Robin	Marie Besnard	The Poisoner	Marie Besnard, l'empoisonneuse	France
2007	Lília Cabral	Marta Toledo Flores	Pages of Life	Páginas da Vida	Brazil
2007	Brenda Ngxoli	Vuyo Radebe	Home Affairs		South Africa
2007	Victoria Wood	Nella Last	Housewife, 49		United Kingdom
2008	Lucy Cohu	Liz	Forgiven		United Kingdom
2008	Irene Ravache	Loreta O'Neill	Eternal Magic	Eterna Magia	Brazil
2008	Sofie Gråbøl	Sarah Lund	The Killing	Forbrydelsen	Denmark
2008	Zhibo Yuan	Runyue	Wait for the Birth of the Husband		China
2009	Julie Walters	Dr Anne Turner	A Short Stay in Switzerland		United Kingdom
2009	Cecilia Suárez	La Bambi	Capadocia		Mexico
2009	Angel Locsin	Lyka Raymundo-Ortega	Lobo		Philippines
2009	Emma de Caunes	Marie Manikowski	Night Birds	Rien dans les poches	France

=== 2010s ===
Year	Recipient	Character	English title	Original title	Country
2010	Helena Bonham Carter	Enid Blyton	Enid		United Kingdom
2010	Lília Cabral	Teresa	Seize the Day	Viver a Vida	Brazil
2010	Iris Berben	Bertha Krupp	Krupp: A Family Between War and Peace	Krupp – Eine deutsche Familie	Germany
2010	Lerato Mvelase	Katlego Mbatha	Home Affairs		South Africa
2011	Julie Walters	Mo Mowlam	Mo		United Kingdom
2011	Adriana Esteves	Dalva de Oliveira	Songs of Betrayal	Dalva e Herivelto: uma Canção de Amor	Brazil
2011	Noomi Rapace	Lisbeth Salander	Millennium		Sweden
2011	Athena Chu	Tai Mung	A Wall-less World	沒有牆的世界 / Méiyǒu qiáng de shìjiè	Hong Kong
2012	Cristina Banegas	Paula	Televisión por la inclusión		Argentina
2012	Sidse Babett Knudsen	Birgitte Nyborg	Borgen		Denmark
2012	Rina Sa	Zhao Lao Ga's wife	Zhong Guo Di		China
2012	Joanna Vanderham	Cathy Connor	The Runaway		United Kingdom
2013	Fernanda Montenegro	Dona Picucha	Sweet Mother	Doce de Mãe	Brazil
2013	Sun Li	Zhen Huan	The Back Palace: Legend of Zhen Huan	后宫·甄嬛传 / Hòugōng·zhēnhuán chuán	China
2013	Sheridan Smith	Charmian Biggs	Mrs Biggs		United Kingdom
2013	Lotta Tejle	Majlis	30 Degrees in February	30° i februari	Sweden
2014	Bianca Krijgsman	Mirte	The New World	De Nieuwe Wereld	Netherlands
2014	Tuba Büyüküstün	Melek Halaskar	20 Minutes	20 Dakika	Turkey
2014	Olivia Colman	Ellie Miller	Broadchurch		United Kingdom
2014	Romina Gaetani	Jorgelina	Televisión por la justicia		Argentina
2015	Anneke von der Lippe	Helen Sikkeland	Eyewitness	Øyevitne	Norway
2015	Fernanda Montenegro	Dona Picucha	Sweet Mother	Doce de Mãe	Brazil
2015	Sheridan Smith	Cilla Black	Cilla		United Kingdom
2016	Christiane Paul	Elke Seeberg	Under the Radar	Unterm Radar	Germany
2016	Grazi Massafera	Larissa Ramos	Hidden Truths	Verdades Secretos	Brazil
2016	Jodi Sta. Maria	Amor de Jesus-Powers	The Promise	Pangako Sa 'Yo	Philippines
2016	Judi Dench	Mrs Lavinia Silver	Roald Dahl's Esio Trot		United Kingdom
2017	Anna Friel	Marcella Backland	Marcella		United Kingdom
2017	Adriana Esteves	Fátima	Above Justice	Justiça	Brazil
2017	Sonja Gerhardt	Monika Schöllack	Ku'damm 56		Germany
2017	Thuso Mbedu	Winnie	Is'Thunzi		South Africa
2018	Anna Schudt	Gaby Köster	Ein Schnupfen hätte auch gereicht		Germany
2018	Thuso Mbedu	Winnie	Is'Thunzi		South Africa
2018	Emily Watson	Dr Yvonne Carmichael	Apple Tree Yard		United Kingdom
2018	Denise Weinberg	Denise Dell Pizzo	Psi		Brazil
2019	Marina Gera	Irén	Eternal Winter	Örök tél	Hungary
2019	Radhika Apte	Kalindi	Lust Stories		India
2019	Jenna Coleman	Joanna Lindsay	The Cry		United Kingdom
2019	Marjorie Estiano	Dr Carolina Alencar	Under Pressure	Sob Pressão	Brazil

=== 2020s ===
Year	Recipient	Character	English title	Original title	Country
2020	Glenda Jackson	Maud Horsham	Elizabeth Is Missing		United Kingdom
2020	Emma Bading	Jennifer Reitwein	Play		Germany
2020	Andréa Beltrão	Hebe Camargo	Hebe	Hebe: A Estrela do Brasil	Brazil
2020	Yeo Yann Yann	Lian	Invisible Stories		Singapore
2021	Hayley Squires	Jolene Dollar	Adult Material		United Kingdom
2021	Valeria Bertuccelli	María "Marie" Vázquez	Notes for My Son	El cuarderno de Tomy	Argentina
2021	Ane Gabarain	Miren Uzkudun	Patria		Spain
2021	Menna Shalabi	Nour	Every week has a Friday		Egypt
2022	Lou de Laâge	Eugénie Cléry	The Mad Women's Ball	Le bal des folles	France
2022	Céline Buckens	Talitha Campbell	Showtrial		United Kingdom
2022	Letícia Colin	Dr. Amanda Vergueiro Meireles	Where My Heart Is	Onde Está Meu Coração	Brazil
2022	Kim Engelbrecht	Reyka Gama	Reyka		South Africa
2023	Karla Souza	Mariel Saenz	Dive	La Caída	Mexico
2023	Connie Nielsen	Karen Blixen	The Dreamer – Becoming Karen Blixen	Drømmeren – Karen Blixen Bliver Til	Denmark
2023	Billie Piper	Suzie Pickles	I Hate Suzie Too		United Kingdom
2023	Shefali Shah	DCP Vartika Chaturvedi	Delhi Crime		India
2024	Chutimon Chuengcharoensukying	Aoy	Hunger		Thailand
2024	Sara Giraudeau	Marion Lafarge	Everything is Fine	Tout va bien	France
2024	Jessica Hynes	Emily Yates	There She Goes		United Kingdom
2024	Adriana Barraza	Teacher Georgina	Where the Tracks End	El Último Vagón	Mexico
2025	Anna Maxwell Martin	Delia Balmer	Until I Kill You		United Kingdom
2025	Charlotte Hope	Micki Pistorius	Catch Me a Killer		South Africa
2025	Carolina Miranda	Esmeralda	Mujeres asesinas		Mexico
2025	Maria Sid	Isa Stenberg	Pressure Point	Smärtpunkten	Sweden
2026	Mona Mina Leon	Yasmine De Laet	Holy Sh!t		Belgium
2026	Bárbara Mori	Bárbara Anderson	Lucca's World	Los dos hemisferios de Lucca	Mexico
2026	Park Ji-hyun	Cheon Sang-yeon	You and Everything Else	은중과 상연	South Korea
2026	Sheridan Smith	Ann Ming	I Fought the Law		United Kingdom

== Photo gallery ==
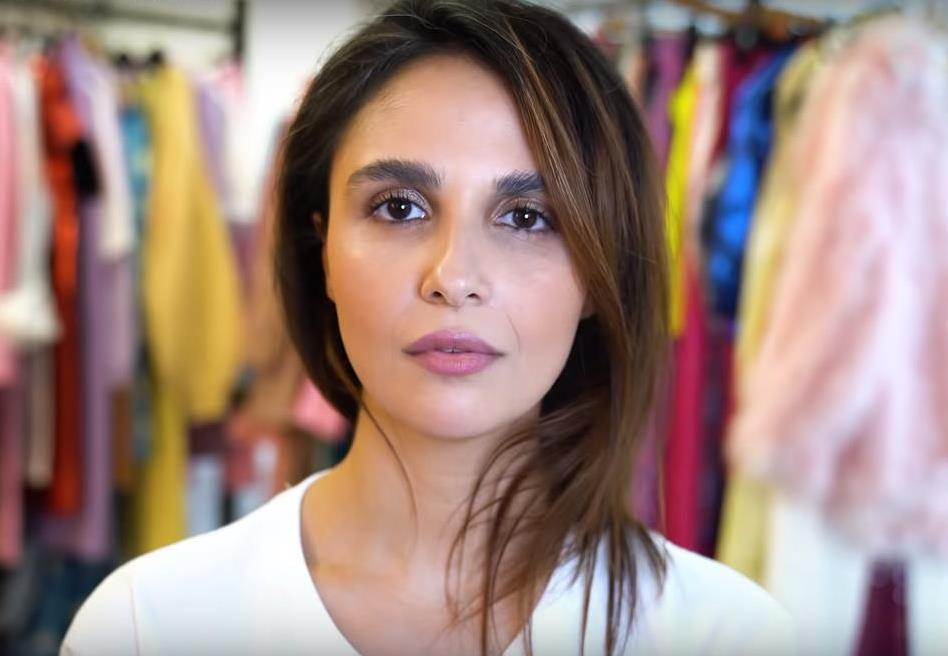
Maryam Hassouni, winner in 2006

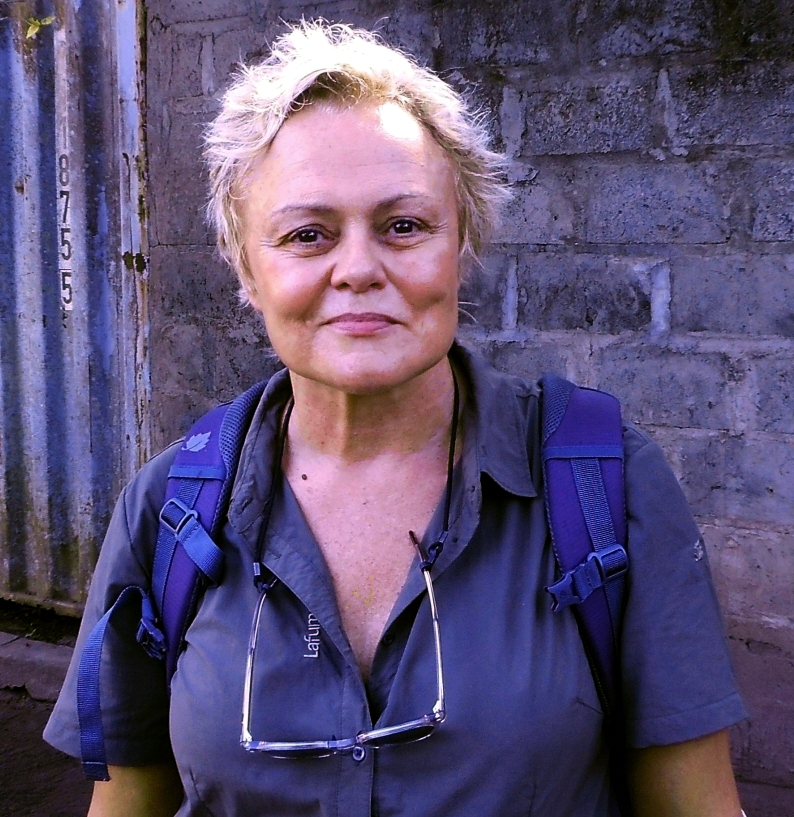
Muriel Robin, winner in 2007

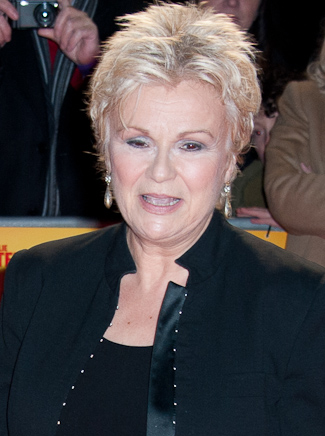
Julie Walters, winner in 2009 and 2011

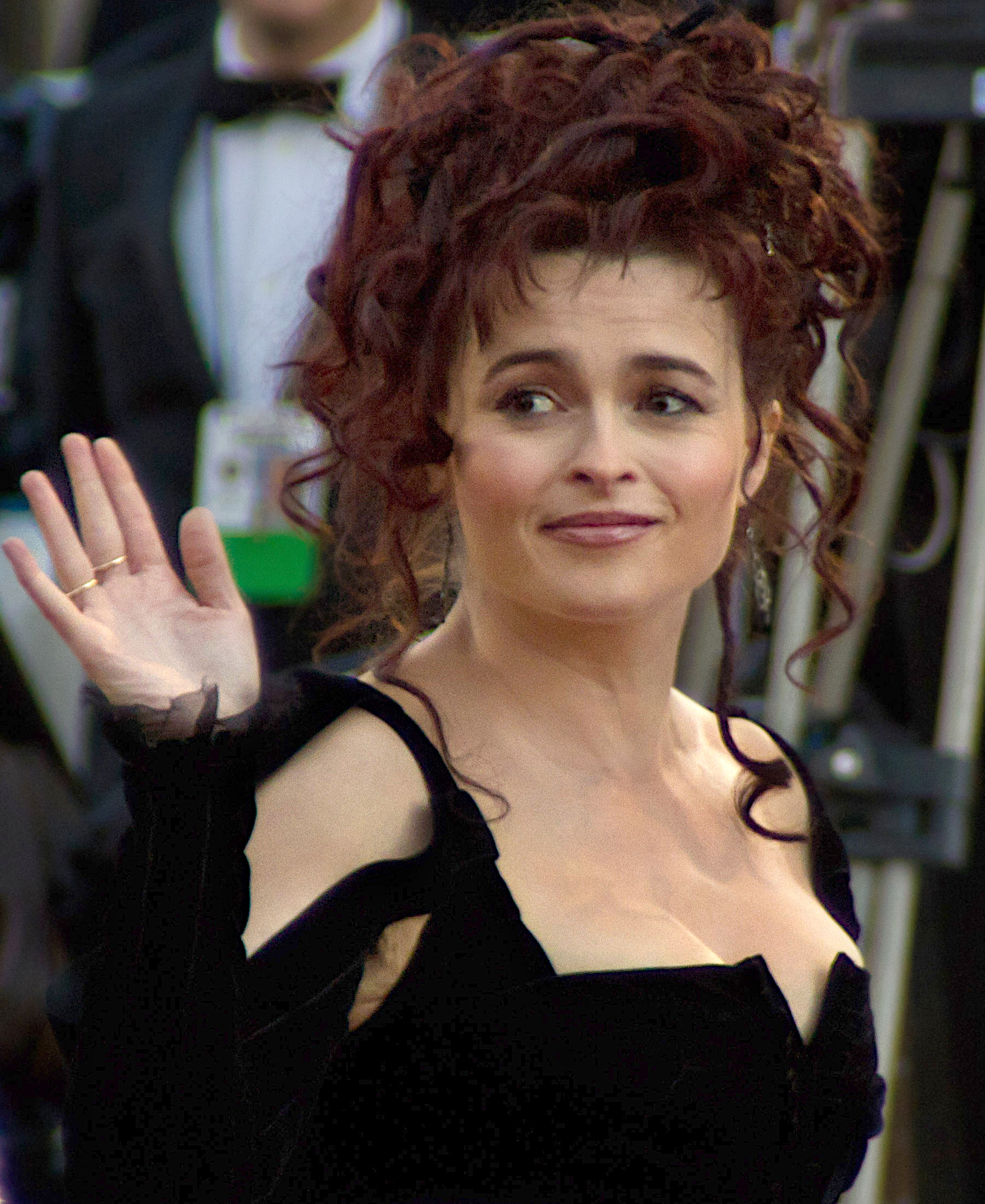
Helena Bonham Carter, winner in 2010

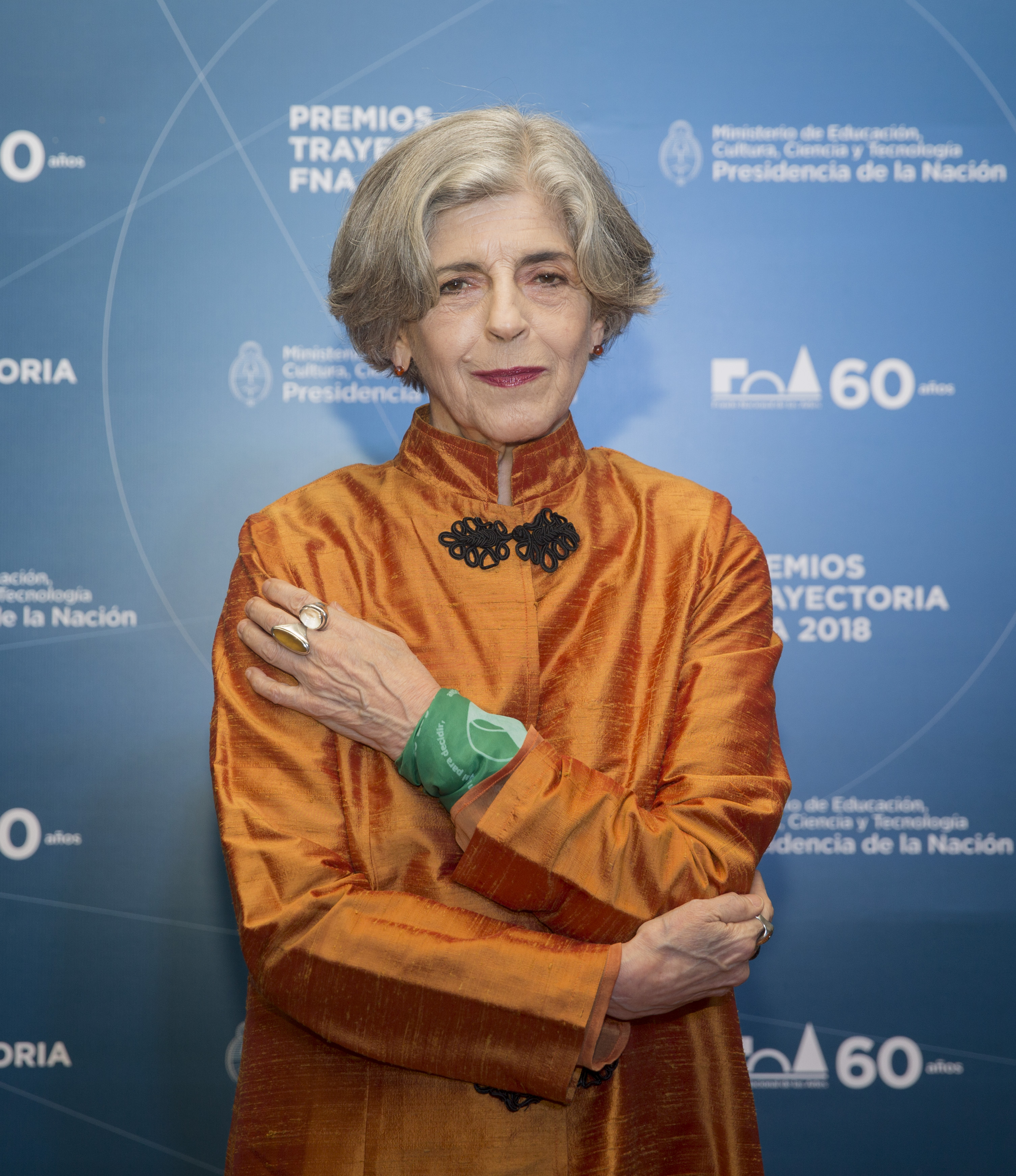
Cristina Banegas, winner in 2012

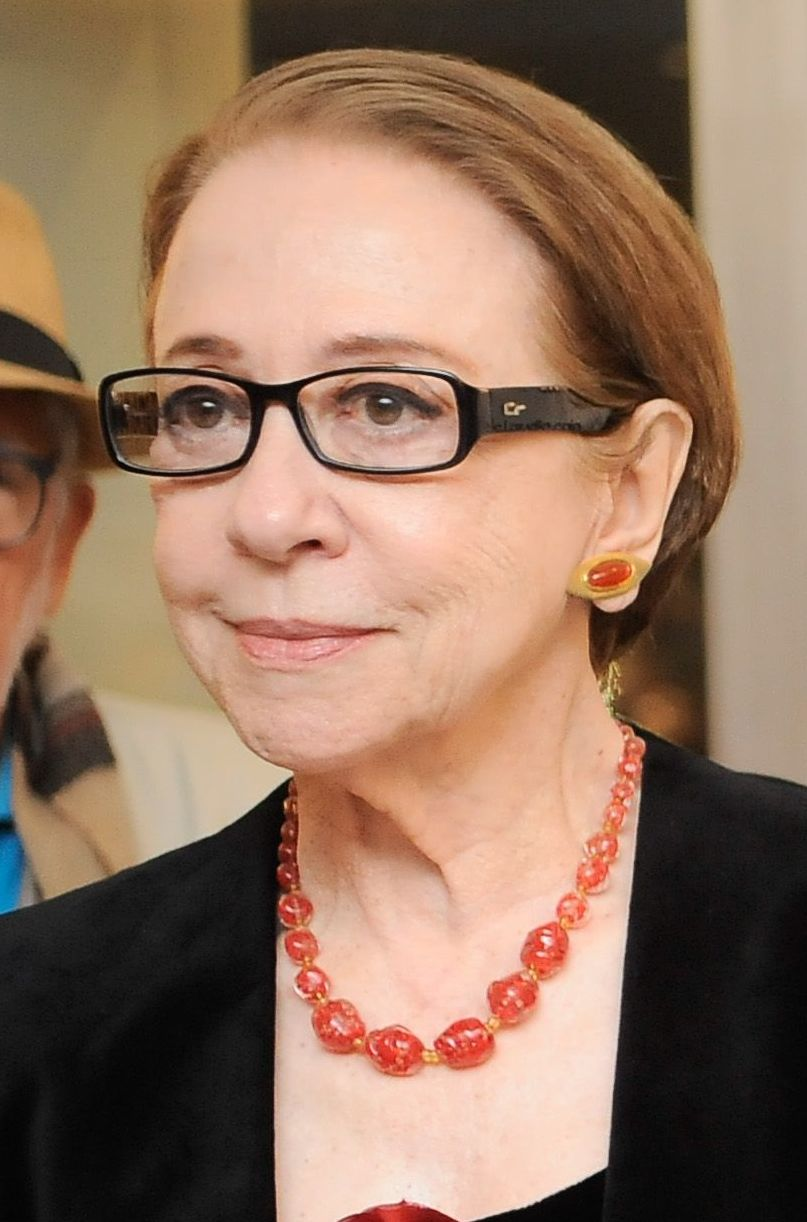
Fernanda Montenegro, winner in 2013

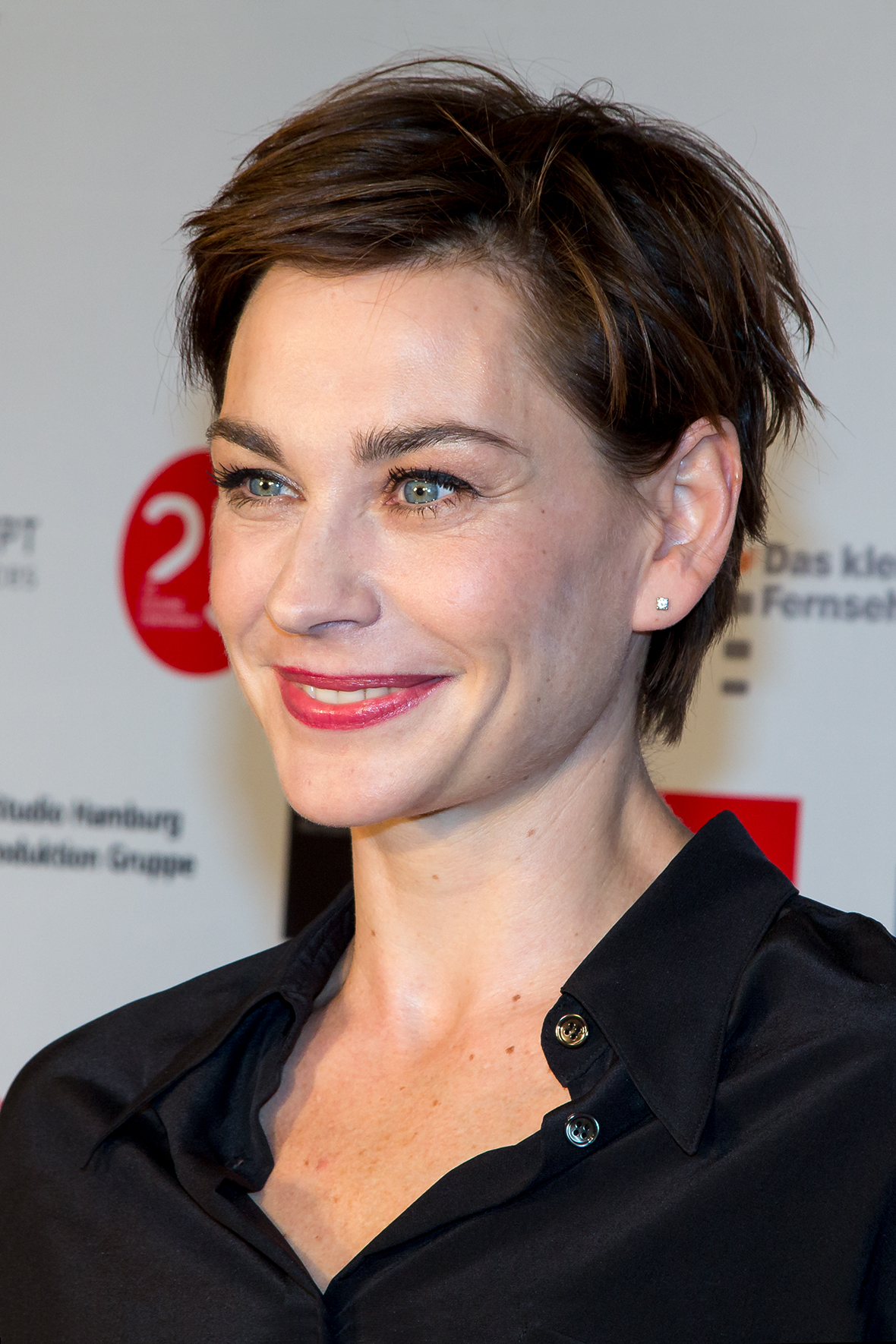
Christiane Paul, winner in 2016

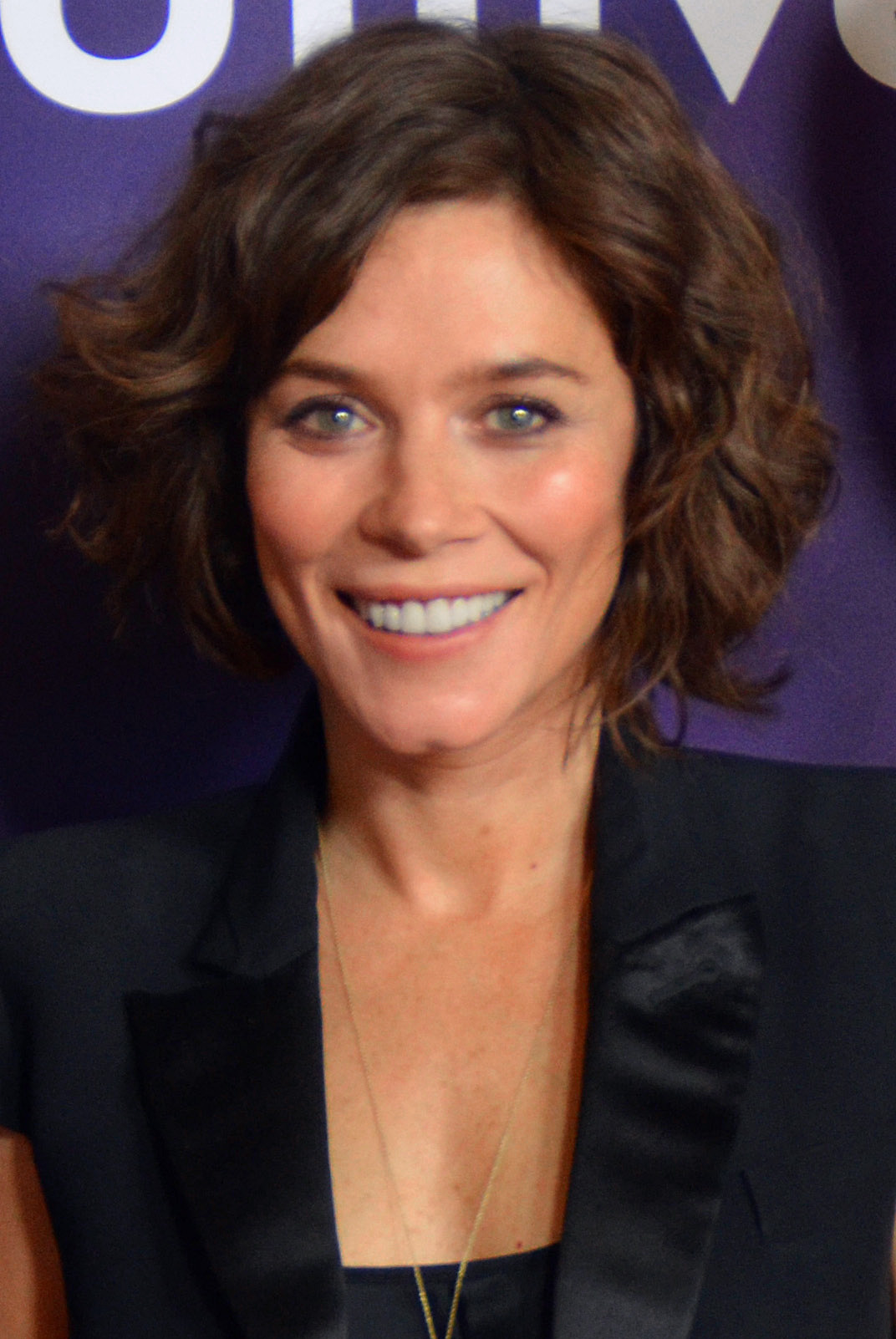
Anna Friel, winner in 2017

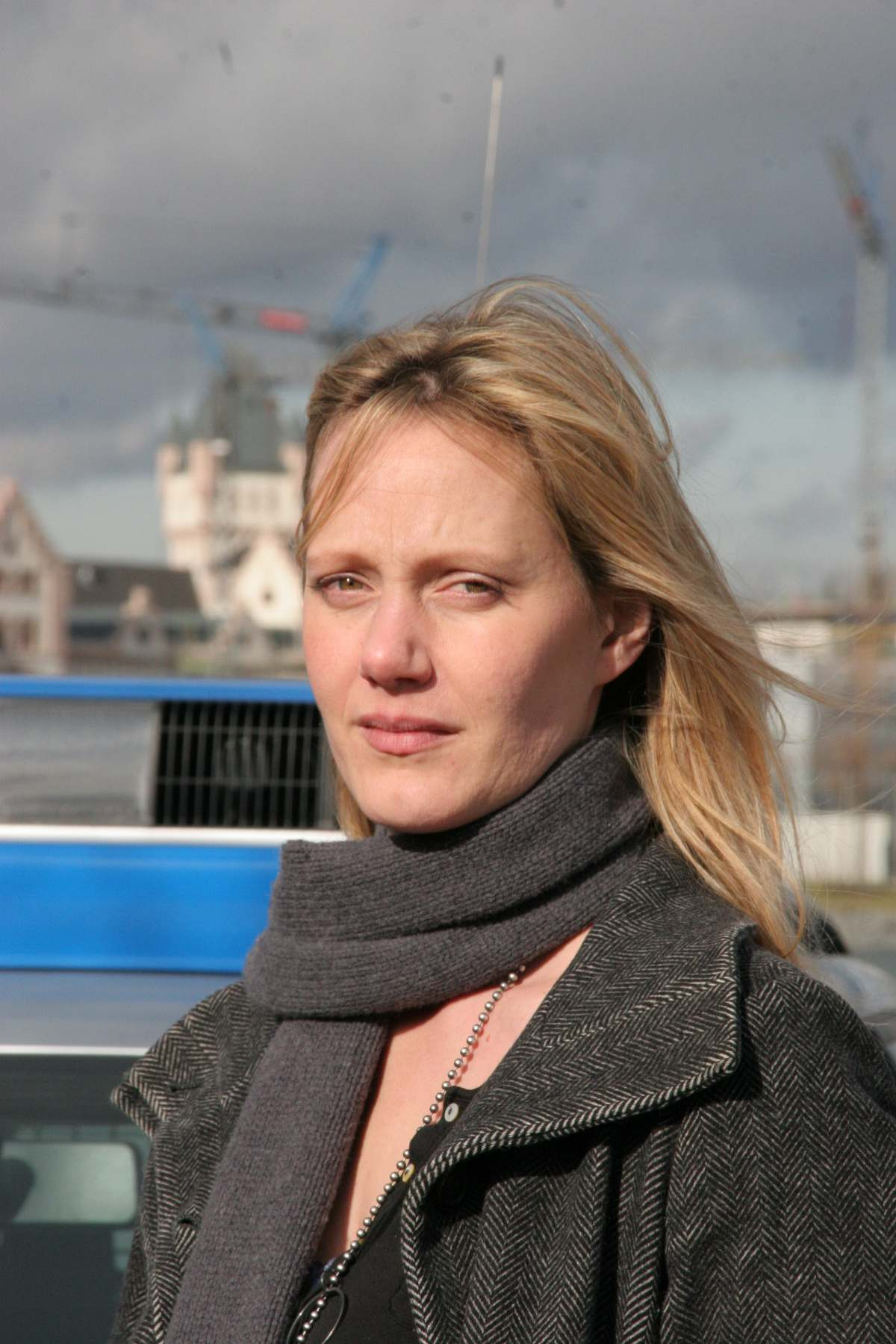
Anna Schudt, winner in 2018

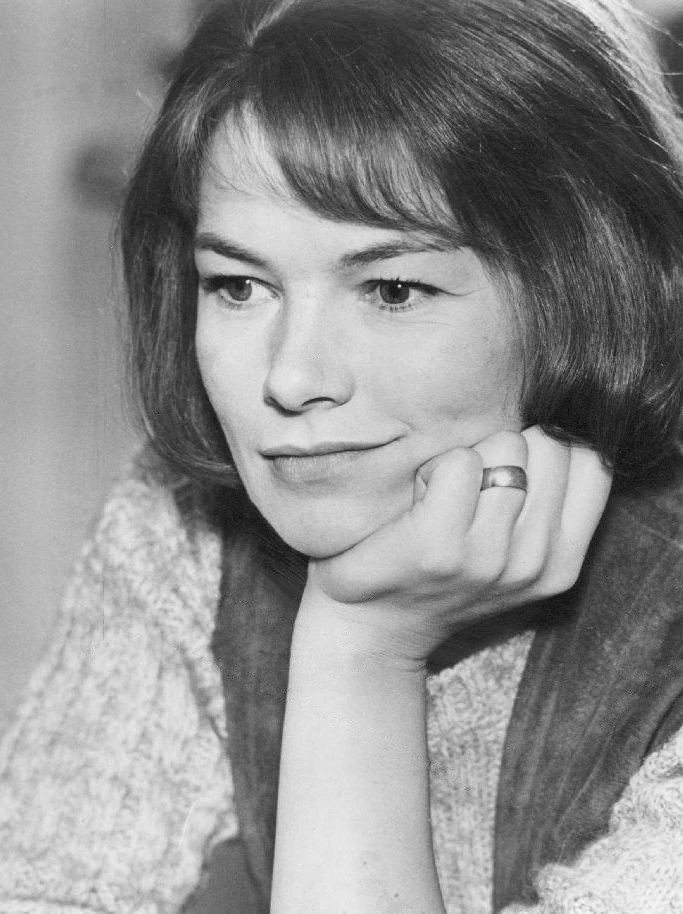
Glenda Jackson, winner in 2020

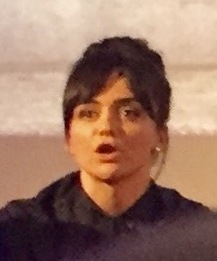
Hayley Squires, winner in 2021

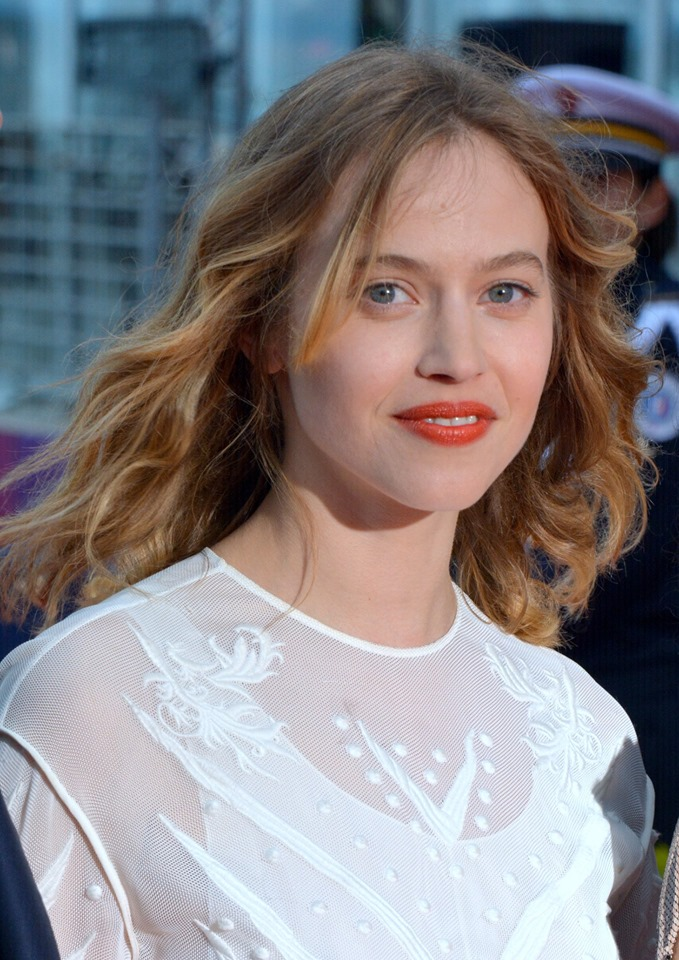
Lou de Laâge, winner in 2022

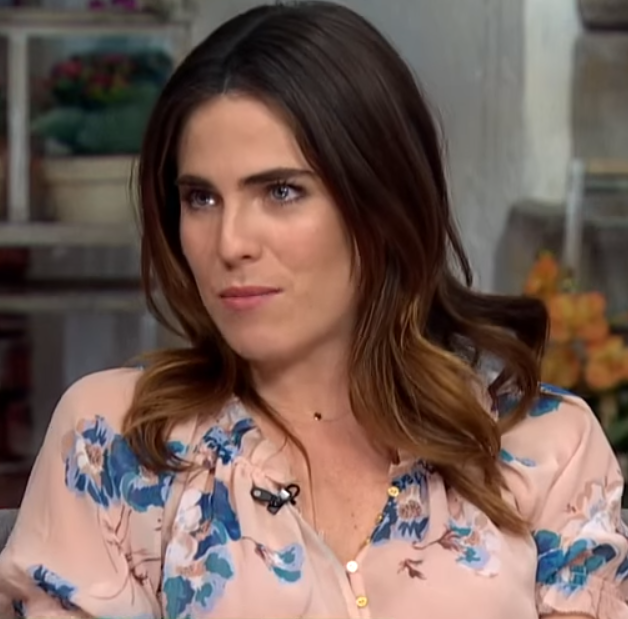
Karla Souza, winner in 2023

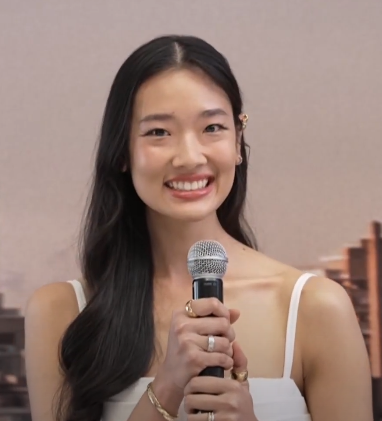
Chutimon Chuengcharoensukying, winner in 2024

== Multiple nominations ==
Most nominations by a female actor

Number	Actress
2	Adriana Esteves
2	Anneke von der Lippe
2	Fernanda Montenegro
2	Julie Walters
2	Lilia Cabral
2	Lucy Cohu
2	Sheridan Smith
2	Thuso Mbedu

Most nominations by a Program

Number	Program
2	Home Affairs
2	Is'Thunzi

Most nominations by country

Number	Country
18	United Kingdom
12	Brazil
6	Germany
4	South Africa
4	China
France
3	Argentina
2	Denmark
2	Philippines
2	Norway
2	Netherlands
2	Sweden

== Multiple wins ==
Most awards won by a female

Number	Actress
2	Julie Walters

Most awards won by a country

Number	Country
5	United Kingdom
2	Germany
2	Netherlands
