= Bernd Stelter =

German comedian and writer (born 1961)

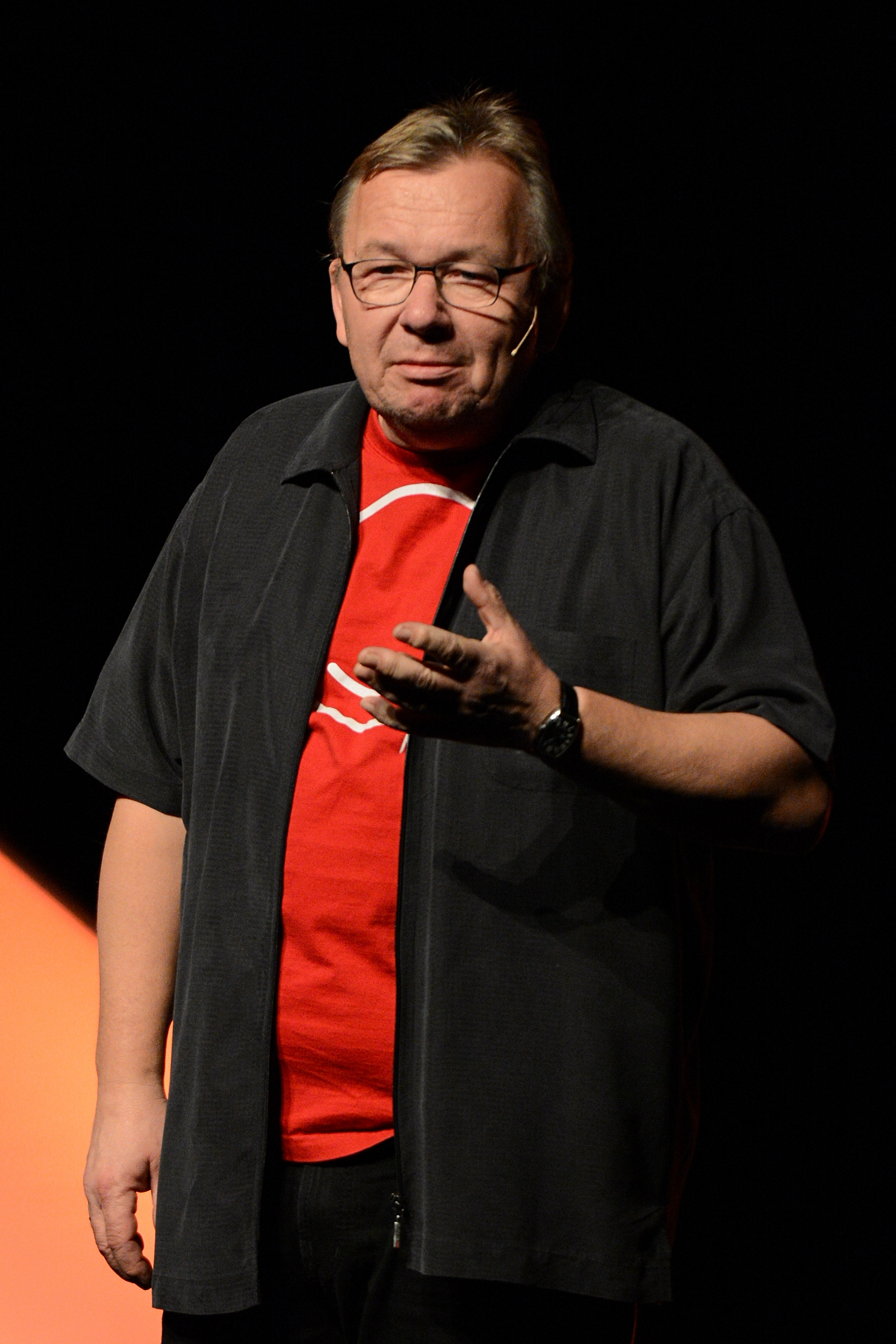
- Stelter in 2013
- Born: 19 April 1961 (age 65); Unna, North Rhine-Westphalia, Germany
- Citizenship: German
- Occupations: Comedian; writer; radio presenter; television presenter; musician; singer
- Years active: 1982–present
- Spouse: Anke Stelter
- Children: 2
- Website: berndstelter.de

Bernd Stelter (born 19 April 1961) is a German Kabarett comedian, writer, musician, singer and presenter.

== Career ==
In the early 1980s, Stelter released two LPs, Das darf uns doch nicht egal sein and Schaut Euch ins Gesicht, which feature a mix of humorous chansons and critical political songs. He also worked as a radio presenter for WDR 4 and RPR. Furthermore, for many years, he served as the "station voice" for Antenne Bayern.

Selter made his first appearance on television in 1990 as a contestant on the show Glücksrad. Later, he gained nationwide popularity through his appearances in shows and series on the TV channel RTL. Especially the comedic talk show 7 Tage, 7 Köpfe (which he co-hosted together with Rudi Carrell, Jochen Busse, Karl Dall, Mike Krüger, Gaby Köster, Kalle Pohl and Oliver Welke) and the sitcom Bernds Hexe were very popular.

In 2007, Stelter moved to WDR, where he hosted the comedy show So lacht NRW as well as the quiz show Das NRW-Duell and the comedy show Deutschland lacht on Das Erste. In 2007, he hosted the gala Danke Rudi in honor of the entertainer and his former colleague Rudi Carrell, who had passed away the previous year.

With his comedy programs Geschichten aus der Vorstadt, Papa ist ’ne Knackwurst, Pubertät ist mehr als Pickel, and Mittendrin – Männer in den Wechseljahren he performed nationwide. From 2011 to 2014, he toured with his show Mundwinkel hoch. Starting in 2014, he toured with the show Wer heiratet, teilt sich die Sorgen, die er vorher nicht hatte. From 2019 onwards, he performed the show Hurra! Ab Montag ist wieder Wochenende!, which explores the joys and downsides of retirement.

=== Carnival ===
Since November 1988, Stelter has been active in the Cologne Carnival. Aside from his stand-up comedy, he is also known for popular carnival songs such as Ober, Zack'n Helles (a parody of Living Next Door to Alice), Hörst du die Regenwürmer husten, Ich hab drei Haare auf der Brust and Mahatma.

In 2019, during the live recording of a Carnival session in Gürzenich, Stelter was verbally attacked on stage by an outraged audience member following a joke about the double surname of the then Leader of the Christian Democratic Union Annegret Kramp-Karrenbauer. After a brief interruption, she was escorted out and the program resumed amidst applause. Session president Joachim Wüst criticized the woman for attempting to "impose her own taste on 1,300 guests." On Twitter, this incident sparked an online discussion whether his program was sexist.

== Works ==
=== Books ===
- 2004: Nie wieder Ferienhaus
- 2004: Das Leben ist zu kurz, um schlechten Wein zu trinken
- 2008: Der Tod hat eine Anhängerkupplung: Ein Campingkrimi
- 2011: Wer abnimmt, hat mehr Platz im Leben.
- 2017: Der Killer kommt auf leisen Klompen. Camping-Krimi.
- 2021: Mieses Spiel um schwarze Muscheln. Camping-Krimi.
- 2022: Wer älter wird, braucht Spaß am Leben.
- 2024: Mode, Mord und Meeresrauschen. Camping-Krimi.
- 2026: Die kalte Hand des Camping-Killers. Camping-Krimi.

=== Music ===
==== Albums ====
- 1982: Das darf uns doch nicht egal sein
- 1984: Schaut Euch ins Gesicht
- 1997: Eine runde Sache
- 2003: Bernds Beste
- 2014: Ein 1/4 Jahrhundert
- 2015: Wer Lieder singt, braucht keinen Therapeuten

==== Singles ====
- 1998: Wahnsinn (Kölle Kölle Kölle)
- 2001: Ich hab drei Haare auf der Brust
- 2002: Das Lied vom Kaninchen
- 2003: Ein Bier im Keller
- 2004: Mahatma
- 2007: Köln ist prima
- 2008: Hörst du die Regenwürmer husten?
- 2010: Glitzer im Gesicht
- 2011: Der Clown
- 2018: Nackig knackig
- 2022: Ein verdammtes Leben
- 2024: O Gott, o Gott, o Gott
- 2025: Kind vom Dorf

== Filmography ==
=== As an actor ===
- 1998: Das Amt (1 episode)
- 1998: Die Anrheiner (1 episode)
- 2000: Ja uff erstmal! - Winnetou unter Comedy Geiern
- 2001: The Little Polar Bear (voice of Palle)
- 2002–2011: Bernds Hexe
- 2013: Lindenstraße (2 episodes)

=== As a presenter or panel member ===
- 1996–1997: Stimmung!
- 1997–2005, 2022: 7 Tage, 7 Köpfe
- 2006: 60 Jahre NRW – Die große Geburtstagsshow
- 2007: Danke, Rudi
- 2008–2016: Das NRW-Duell
- 2007: So lacht NRW
- 2024: Genial witzig - Das große Witze-Battle

=== Guest appearances in entertainment shows ===
- 1990: Glücksrad
- 2000, 2012: Zimmer frei!
- 2002: Stars in der Manege
- 2003: Wer wird Millionär?
- 2003, 2004, 2005, 2006, 2007, 2008, 2009, 2012: Verstehen Sie Spaß?
- 2004: Das Quiz mit Jörg Pilawa
- 2004, 2005, 2008, 2010: Die ultimative Chart-Show
- 2006: Darf man das?
- 2007: Deutschland lacht
- 2007: Die große Maus-Show
- 2007: Die große Show der Naturwunder
- 2008: Die große ARD-Weltreise
- 2009: Das Schlagzeilenquiz
- 2009: Das unglaubliche Quiz der Tiere
- 2010: Die große Wissensshow mit Ranga Yogeshwar
- 2013, 2014, 2015, 2020: Spätschicht - Die Comedy Bühne
- 2014: Grünwald - Freitagscomedy
- 2016, 2018, 2021, 2023, 2024, 2025: Wer weiß denn sowas?
- 2018, 2019, 2020, 2025, 2026: Immer wieder sonntags
- 2020: Mann, Sieber!
- 2020, 2022: Quizduell
- 2021: Wohnzimmer-Comedy - Mit Dui do on de Sell

== Comedy Programs ==
- 1999: Geschichten aus der Vorstadt
- 2004: Papa ist ’ne Knackwurst
- 2005: Pubertät ist mehr als Pickel
- 2008: Mittendrin – Männer in den Wechseljahren
- 2011: Mundwinkel hoch
- 2014: Wer heiratet, teilt sich die Sorgen, die er vorher nicht hatte
- 2019: Hurra! Ab Montag ist wieder Wochenende!
- 2026: Reg Dich nicht auf! Gibt nur Falten.
