= 7 Tage, 7 Köpfe =

- Also known as: Sieben Tage, sieben Köpfe
- Genre: Comedy / Documentary
- Directed by: Dieter Zeihner
- Presented by: Jochen Busse
- Country of origin: Germany
- Original language: German
- No. of seasons: 12

Production
- Producer: Burkhard Bergermann
- Cinematography: Günther Adlmüller
- Editor: Gabi Mensching

Original release
- Network: RTL
- Release: 23 February 1996 – 30 December 2005

7 Tage, 7 Köpfe (Sieben Tage, sieben Köpfe, lit. Seven days, seven heads) is a German comedy television program of the television station RTL Television and featured a humorous retrospective of the past week. The show was hosted by Jochen Busse.

From 23 February 1996 the show was recorded every Friday in the afternoon to be broadcast in the evening, normally at 10:15 pm, on RTL. On 2 June 2005 it was announced that the show was to be discontinued at the end of 2005 due to declining audience ratings amongst other things. On 30 December 2005 the last show entitled "Das große Finale" ("The Grand Finale") was broadcast.

== The Show ==
=== Concept ===
In the show the most recent topics of the last seven days were reviewed humorously by seven celebrities.

The regular staff consisted of presenter Jochen Busse and five celebrities. Each week, a new guest from the field of cabaret or comedy was added to fill the seventh seat.

After a short topic introduction by Busse, each celebrity commented on the topic with a joke or a sketch. Also the dynamic between the celebrities and the guests was beneficial to the success of the show.

However, it has emerged that each of the celebrities' contributions were normally prewritten by a team of ghostwriters and were rehearsed before the recording, as is common practice in many "comedy" shows.

=== Staff ===
The regular staff consisted of Mike Krüger, Kalle Pohl, Gaby Köster, Bernd Stelter and Oliver Welke, who took the seat of Rudi Carrell in 2002. Carrell however still appeared on camera at special events and produced the show.

In the beginning the staff consisted of Karl Dall, Bärbel Schäfer, Hellmuth Karasek, Milena Preradovic and celebrities from entertainment and politics like Gregor Gysi, Jürgen Möllemann, Friedrich Nowottny or Marcel Reif. Carrell died in 2006 of lung cancer at the age of 71 in his sanctuary in Lower Saxony.

=== Guests ===
The seventh seat and sometimes even one or two regulars' seats were given to another celebrity from comedy or politics each week. Thus over 70 different celebrities were guests on the show, among them Michael Mittermeier, Ingo Appelt, Mario Barth, Django Asül, Dieter Nuhr, Atze Schröder, Piet Klocke, Stefan Raab, Hans Werner Olm, Willy Astor, Ingo Oschmann, Bernhard Hoëcker, Hennes Bender, Anka Zink, Dr. Eckart von Hirschhausen, Ludger Stratmann, Thomas Hermanns, Ina Müller and Oliver Pocher.

In the final show Harald Schmidt appeared in the last five minutes of the show as a guest. Schmidt often ridiculed the show in his own show - for which he "apologized" in the show - and was one of the greatest critics of the show. Nevertheless, he agreed to this guest appearance because of his paragon and fatherly friend Rudi Carrell, who was already so ill at this time that he only poured a glass of water over Harald Schmidt on his final appearance without saying a word.

== Running gags ==
Over time, some things on the show evolved into running gags. For example, Rudi Carrell always made jokes about Mike Krüger's nose, who in turn made jokes about the Dutch and their caravans and about Carrell's age. Kalle Pohl was the victim of jokes about dwarfism, Bernd Stelter about fat people, Oliver Welke about baldness, Jochen Busse about ironing creases and Gaby Köster had to suffer jokes about women.

Other running gags were the "terrible childhood" of Mike Krüger. This gag always began with:"Ja, Sie wissen alle...ich hatte eine (Oooohhh!)..fürchterliche Kindheit."/"Well, you all know it...I had a (Audience: Oooohhh!)..terrible childhood." Running gags of Kalle Pohl were his pretendes stunning success with women (Ja, ich als Frauentyp..."/"Well, me as a woman's hero..."), his "cousin Hein Spack" (Vetter Hein Spack) who is always angry ("Ey wat is los, dumm Sau?!"Ey what's the matter, dumb sow?!") or his "aunt Mimi" (Tante Mimi) who is always complaining. Gaby Köster made such a running gag with her "grandma Finchen" (Oma Finchen) who is also perpetually nagging.

Jochen Busse always greeted the audience "in seiner gewohnt liebenswürdigen Art" (in his distinctly amicable way) and finished each show with: "Bleiben Sie uns gewogen" (Keep us in good remembrance). The recent shows each ended with a "surprise".

== Awards ==
The format was awarded prizes several times. The show received television and viewer awards like the "Golden Lion" and the "Bambi".

In 2004 the special prize of the Deutscher Comedypreis (German Comedy Prize) was awarded to 7 Tage, 7 Köpfe, since the show had been on RTL for 250 shows and set benchmarks in German television comedy.

== See also ==
- German television comedy
