= Jasmin Schwiers =

German actress (born 1982)

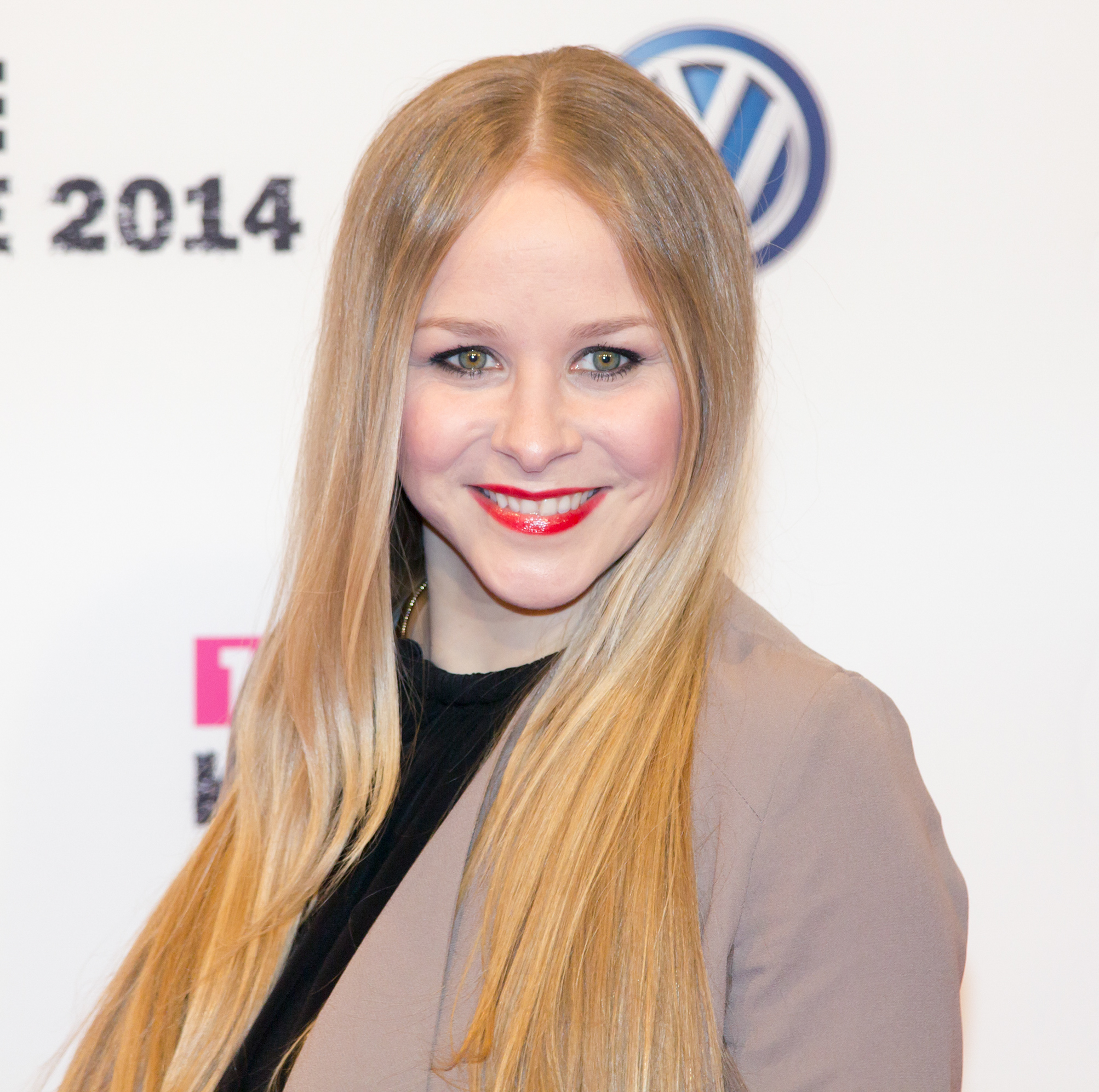
- Schwiers in 2014
- Born: 11 August 1982 (age 43); Eupen, Belgium
- Occupation: Actress

Jasmin Schwiers (born 11 August 1982) is a German actress.

== Life and career ==
Schwiers grew up in the German-speaking community in eastern Belgium. She began her career in children's theatre, and later made appearances in several German TV series and television movies. She got her breakthrough in 1998 as the daughter of Rita Kruse, played by Gaby Köster, in the RTL comedy series Ritas Welt. The following year she made her cinema debut, and by the time she graduated from high school, she had worked on about 20 productions.

In addition to acting, Schwiers organizes creative groups for children at Bleiberger Fabrik, an educational facility in Aachen, Germany, and is an ambassador for the German Children's Hospice Association in Olpe, Germany. In 2012, she recorded the song "Dann bin ich zu Haus" with musician Gregor Meyle.

Schwiers lives in Cologne and is married to actor Jan van Weyde. Their first daughter was born in August 2014 and they had a second daughter in May 2019. Her brother Rene is a musician in the Kölschrock group Kasalla.

== Selected filmography ==
=== Television ===
List of television appearances, with year, title, and role shown
Year	Title	Role	Notes
1999	Die Wache		1 episode
1999–2000	Tanja	Paula	5 episodes
1999–2001	Ritas Welt	Sandra Kruse	29 episodes
1999/2001	Tatort	Nadine / Sarah Köster	2 episodes
2003	Stubbe – Von Fall zu Fall	Kater Förster	1 episode
2003	Tatort	Julia	1 episode
2005–2006	Bis in die Spitzen	Rosa	7 episodes
2006	Polizeiruf 110	Angelina / Andrea	1 episode
2006	Abschnitt 40		1 episode
2007	Ein Fall für zwei		1 episode
2007	SOKO Rhein-Main		1 episode
2007–2013	Stolberg	Svenja Landau	8 episodes
2009	Der Kapitän	Anita Harmsen	2 episodes
2009	Lutter	Christina Siegener	1 episode
2010	Tatort	Julia Gerber	1 episode
2010	SOKO Wismar		1 episode
2010	Deadline – Jede Sekunde zählt		1 episode
2011	Leipzig Homicide		1 episode
2011–2013	KRIMI.DE		3 episodes
2012	Danni Lowinski		1 episode
2014	Küstenwache		1 episode
2014	The Old Fox		1 episode
2017	Cologne P.D.		1 episode
2017	Die Chefin		1 episode
2018	Deutsch-les-Landes	Marion	

=== Film ===
List of film appearances, with year, title, and role shown
Year	Title	Role	Notes
2000	Heimliche Küsse – Verliebt in ein Sex-Symbol	Lisa Schröder	
2002	Tattoo	Marie Minks	
2005	NVA	Marie Kalt	
2008	Little Paris	Eve	
2009	Mord ist mein Geschäft, Liebling	Lisa	
2017	Ein Schnupfen hätte auch gereicht	Jackie	

== Awards and recognition ==
- 2000: "Günter-Strack-Fernsehpreis" at Studio Hamburg for outstanding performance in the film Heimliche Küsse – Verliebt in ein Sex-Symbol
- 2005: "Lilli Palmer & Curd Jürgens Gedächtniskamera" prize at the Goldene Kamera.
