= 46th International Emmy Awards =

2018 awards ceremony

- Promotional poster
- Date: November 19, 2018
- Location: New York Hilton Midtown, New York City
- Hosted by: Hari Kondabolu

Highlights
- Founders Award: Greg Berlanti

The 46th International Emmy Awards took place November 19, 2018 at the New York Hilton Midtown in New York City. The award ceremony, presented by the International Academy of Television Arts and Sciences (IATAS), honors all TV programming produced and originally aired outside the United States and celebrated excellence in International television.

== Ceremony ==
Nominations for the 46th International Emmy Awards were announced on September 27, 2018, by the International Academy of Television Arts & Sciences (IATAS). Nominees come from Australia, Belgium, Brazil, Canada, Chile, Denmark, Germany, India, Israel, Japan, Mexico, Netherlands, Portugal, Spain, South Africa, South Korea, Thailand, Turkey, United Kingdom and the United States.

In addition to the presentation of the International Emmys for programming and performances, the International Academy presented two special awards. Greg Berlanti received the Founders Award, and Sophie Turner Laing of Endemol Shine Group, received the Directorate Award.

== Summary ==
Country	Nominations	Wins
Brazil	6	0
Canada	5	0
United States	4	1
United Kingdom	4	2
Mexico	3	0
Turkey	3	0
Spain	2	1
Argentina	2	0
Japan	2	0
Netherlands	2	1
India	1	0
Israel	1	1
Portugal	1	1
Germany	1	1
Denmark	1	1
Belgium	1	1
Chile	1	1

== Winners and nominees ==
Best Telenovela	Best Drama Series
Ouro Verde (Portugal) (TVI/Plural Entertainment); Cesur ve Güzel (Turkey) (Ay Yapim); İstanbullu Gelin (Turkey) (O3 Medya/Global Agency); Paquita la del Barrio (Mexico) (Sony Pictures Television/Imagen Televisión/Teleset)	Money Heist (Spain) (Vancouver Media/Atresmedia Televisión); Inside Edge (India) (Amazon Studios); 1 Contra Todos (Brazil) (Conspiração Filmes/Fox Networks Group); Urban Myths (United Kingdom) (Happy Tramp Productions/Sky plc)
Best TV Movie or Miniseries	Best Arts Programming
Man in an Orange Shirt (United Kingdom) (Kudos); Mais Forte que o Mundo (Brazil) (Globo/Black Maria/Paris Entretenimento); Kurara: The Dazzling Life of Hokusai's Daughter (Japan) (NHK Enterprises/NHK); Toter Winkel (Germany) (Geissendoerfer Film & Fernsehproduktion/WDR)	Etgar Keret: Based on a True Story (Netherlands) (Baldr Film/NTR Television); Dreaming of a Jewish Christmas (Canada) (Riddle Films); Palavras em Série (Brazil) (GNT/Hungry Man); David Stratton's Story of Australian Cinema (Australia) (Stranger Than Fiction Films)
Best Comedy Series	Best Documentary
Nevsu (Israel) (Endemol Shine Israel/'Gesher' Fund/Avi Chai Fund); Workin' Moms (Canada) (Wolf + Rabbit Entertainment); Club de Cuervos (Mexico) (Alazraki Films/Netflix); El fin de la comedia (Spain) (Comedy Central España)	Goodbye Aleppo (United Kingdom) (BBC Arabic); Eu Sou Assim (Brazil) (GNT/TV Zero); De Wereld van Puck (Netherlands) (KURTA/EO Television); Who I Am (Japan) (WOWOW/Acrobat Film)
Best Actor	Best Actress
Lars Mikkelsen in Ride Upon the Storm (Denmark) (DR/Arte/SAM le Français); Tolga Sarıtaş in Söz (Turkey) (Tims&B Productions); Júlio Andrade in 1 Contra Todos (Brazil) (Conspiração Filmes/Fox Brazil); Billy Campbell in Cardinal (Canada) (Sienna Films/Entertainment One)	Anna Schudt in Ein Schnupfen hätte auch gereicht (Germany) (Zeitsprung Pictures/RTL); Thuso Mbedu in Is'Thunzi (South Africa) (Rapid Blue); Emily Watson in Apple Tree Yard (United Kingdom) (Kudos); Denise Weinberg in Psi (Brazil) (HBO Latin America/O2 Filmes)
Short-Form Series	Best Non-Scripted Entertainment
Una historia necesaria (Chile) (Tridi Films/CNTV/Escuela de Cine de Chile); L'Âge adulte (Canada) (Productions Pixcom); How to Buy a Baby (Canada) (LoCo Motion Pictures); The Sensible Life of Director Shin (South Korea) (Seventytwo Seconds)	Hoe Zal Ik Het Zeggen? (Belgium) (Shelter); Masterchef Australia (Australia) (Endemol Shine Australia); The Mask Singer (Thailand) (Thai Broadcasting Company); Top Chef Mexico (Mexico) (Sony Pictures Television/Cinemateli)
Best Non-English Language U.S. Primetime Program
El Vato (United States) (Universo/Endemol Shine Boomdog); El Señor de los Cielos (United States) (Telemundo/Argos Televisión); Mariposa de barrio (United States) (Telemundo); Sin senos sí hay paraíso (United States) (Telemundo/Fox Telecolombia)
