= Motorrad =

Motorrad is the German word for motorcycle.

- Motorrad (magazine), German motorcycle magazine
- BMW Motorrad, a motorcycle brand
- Motorrad (film), a 2017 Brazilian film
