= Marina Gera =

Hungarian actress (born 1984)

- Born: 29 June 1984 (age 42); Szeged, Hungary
- Education: University of Theatre and Film Arts in Budapest
- Occupation: Actress
- Years active: 2008–present

Marina Gera (born 29 June 1984) is a Hungarian actress. She was the first actress in her country to win an Emmy Award for her role in the film drama Eternal Winter (2018) at the 47th International Emmy Awards.

== Filmography ==
- 2019: Good Morning (Short) (post-production) ... Sára
- 2018: A Hawk & A Hacksaw: The Magic Spring (Short) ... woman II
- 2018: The Field Guide to Evil ... Nymph (segment "Cobblers' Lot")
- 2018: Örök tél ...Irén (won International Emmy Award for Best Actress)
- 2017: Intermezzo (Short)
- 2017: L.U.F.I. (curta-metragem) ... Girl in the cemetery
- 2017: The Basement ... Doll-Face
- 2016: Aranyélet ...Gemenci Mari / Mari Gemenci
- 2016: In the Same Garden
- 2014: Senki szigete ...Marina
- 2014: Fehér isten ... Woman at Dog Fight
- 2014: Free Fall (Szabadesés) ... Naked woman at the party
- 2014: Munkaügyek ... Viola
- 2013: Prágai hétvége (Short) ... Singer
- 2011: Úsvit (Short)
- 2009: Utolsó idök (uncredited)
- 2007: Szerafina (Short) ... Szerafina Fátyol
