= Emílio de Mello =

Brazilian actor (born 1965)

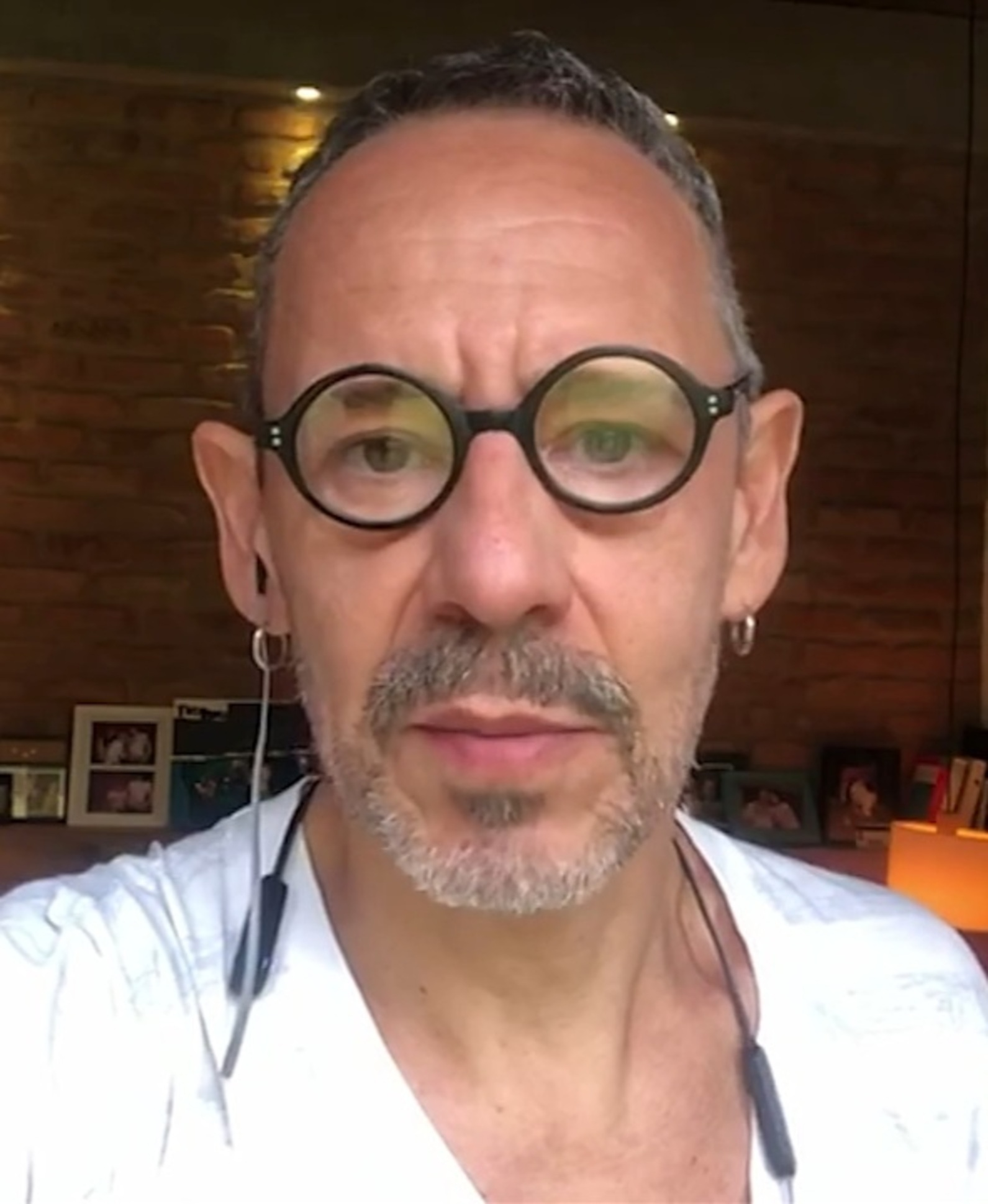
- Mello in 2020
- Born: 14 July 1965 (age 60); São Paulo, Brazil
- Occupation: Actor
- Years active: 1989–present

Emílio de Mello (born 14 July 1965) is a Brazilian actor. In 2015, the actor was nominated for an International Emmy Awards for Best Actor, for his starring role in the Series Psi

== Selected filmography ==
TV

- 2015 - Sete Vidas - Vinícius
- 2014 - Geração Brasil - Fernando
- 2014–present - Psi - Carlo Antonini
- 2012 - Lado a Lado - Carlos Guerra
- 2011 - Cordel Encantado - General Baldini
- 2010 - Dalva e Herivelto: uma Canção de Amor - Benedito Lacerda
- 2008 - Ó Paí, Ó - Lacerda
- 2008 - Queridos Amigos - Guto (Luís Augusto Souza Tavares)
- 2006 - JK - Carlos Murilo
- 2004 - Histórias de Cama e Mesa - Ronaldo Cunha
- 1994 - Pátria Minha - Hélio Pastor
- 1992 - Anos Rebeldes - Toledo

Films

- 2004 - O Veneno da Madrugada - Roberto Assis
- 2004 - Cazuza – O Tempo Não Pára - Zeca (Ezequiel Neves)
- 2002 - Lara - Luigi
- 2002 - Querido Estranho - Betinho
- 2001 - Amores Possíveis - Pedro
- 2000 - Villa-Lobos - Uma Vida de Paixão - Arthur Rubinstein
- 2017 - Motorrad

== Awards ==
Year	Award	Category	Work	Result
2002	Gramado Film Festival	Best Supporting Actor	Querido Estranho	Nominated
2005	Grande Prêmio do Cinema Brasileiro	Best Supporting Actor	Cazuza – O Tempo não Para	Nominated
2015	43rd International Emmy Awards	Best Performance by an Actor	Psi	Nominated
