= Tanja (TV series) =

German young adult television series

- Genre: Young adult
- Written by: Berengar Pfahl
- Starring: Katharina Wackernagel; Matthias Schloo; Robert Glatzeder; Verena Plangger; Peter Wilczynski; Jasmin Schwiers; Laura Schuhrk
- Composer: Matthias Raue
- Country of origin: Germany
- Original language: German
- No. of seasons: 3
- No. of episodes: 39

Original release
- Network: ARD
- Release: 1997 – 2000

Tanja is a 39-episode German ARD young adult television series written by Berengar Pfahl that aired between 1997 and 2000 on ARD. The show is set in Warnemünde, Mecklenburg-West Pomerania, on the Baltic Sea.

== Synopsis ==
The show deals with typical problems experienced by young adults, such as quarrelling with parents, studies, first love, unwanted pregnancies, etc. The focus and namesake of the series is Tanja Buesing.

Season 1

In the first season, Tanja has to deal with the suspicion that she may be pregnant. Later, she is confronted with the death of her friend David, who dies in a boating accident, for which she blames herself. At the end of the season, Tanja begins a relationship with Felix, while Bille, her friend, is pregnant by Jörg, Tanja's brother.

Season 2

The second season is shaped by Tanja's entry into professional life. She begins an apprenticeship with a shipping company. At the end of the season, she receives an offer to go to New York for three months.

Season 3

In the third and last season, Tanja finishes her apprenticeship while the shipping company where she is studying is about to go bankrupt.

== Cast and characters ==
- Katharina Wackernagel as Tanja Büsing
- Matthias Schloo as Felix Woldmann
- Robert Glatzeder as Nils Humpert
- Verena Plangger as Gaby Büsing
- Peter Wilczynski as Jörg Büsing
- Jasmin Schwiers as Paula
- Laura Schuhrk as Bille
