= Kalle Pohl =

German comedian and actor

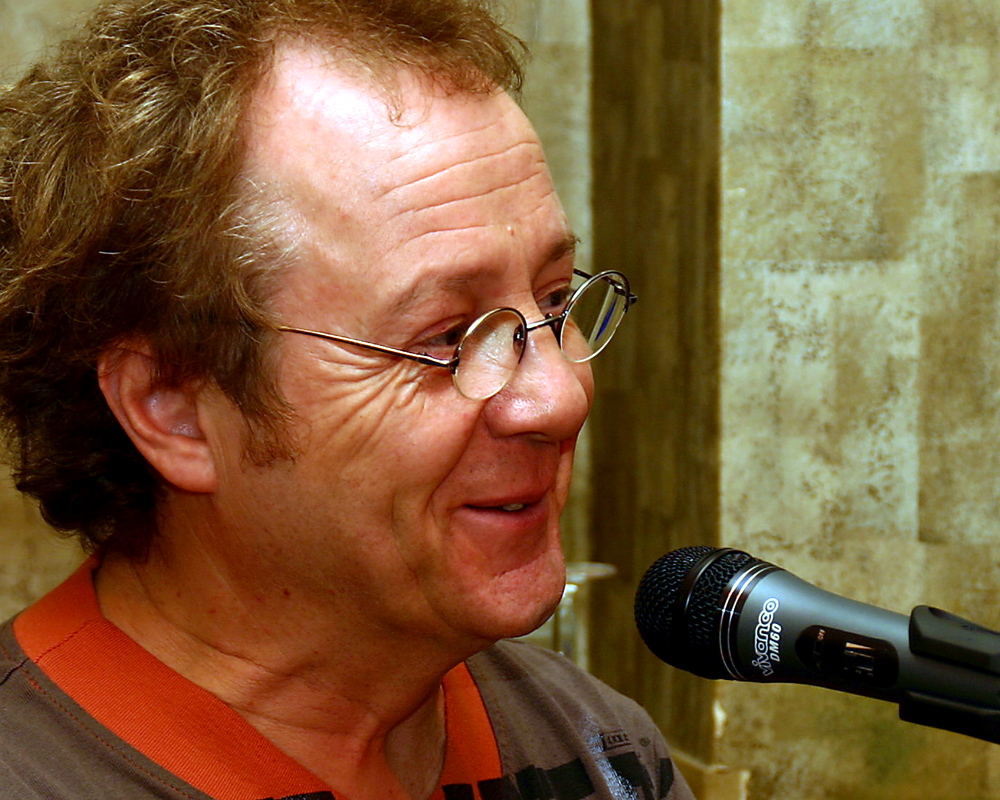
- Pohl in Cologne
- Born: 20 August 1951 (age 74); Düren, Germany
- Occupations: Comedian; Actor
- Website: Personal website

Kalle Pohl (born 20 August 1951 in Düren) is a German comedian and actor.

== Life ==
Pohl works as comedian and actor in Germany. He plays guitarre.

== Works ==
=== Theatre ===
- 2007: Norman, bist du es?
- 2010: Denn sie wissen nicht, was sie erben
- 2012: Ein schöner Schwede
- 2012: Diskretion Ehrensache

=== Cabaret programme ===
- 1980: Musik ist meine Welt
- 1983: Hausmeister gesucht?
- 1985: Schangsong Pläsier
- 1989: Rettet die Currywurst
- 1996: Zwergenaufstand
- 1999: Nach oben
- 2004: Bettmän
- 2007: Kalles Kiosk
- 2011: Du bist mir ja einer

=== Music ===
- 1980: Wanna be a Schlagerstar, LP
- 1989: Rettet die Currywurst, single
- 2000: Dumm Sau TV, album
- 2002: Immer auf die Kleinen, single
- 2002: Ladykiller, album

=== Television ===
- Ausgetrickst, ARD
- Star Leichtathletik, ARD
- Grünwald Freitagscomedy, BR
- Ihr seid wohl wahnsinnig! Die gefährlichste Show der Welt, RTL
- 7 Tage, 7 Köpfe, RTL
- Manngold, comedy serie, TM3
- Das perfekte Promi-Dinner (2010), VOX

=== TV roles in ===
- Großstadtrevier, ARD
- Ritas Welt, RTL
- SK Kölsch, Sat.1
- Brennende Herzen, ARD
- Der Schiedsmann, WDR
- Kalle kocht, RTL
- Die Märchenstunde: Frau Holle, Pro 7
- Tatort: Zwischen den Ohren (2011)

=== Cineplex ===
- Peanuts
- Hans im Glück

== Awards ==
- 1988 Linzer Kleinkunstpreis
- 1998 Bambi in category best comedy show for 7 Tage 7 Köpfe
- 1998 Goldener Löwe for 7 Tage 7 Köpfe
- 1999 Goldener Gong, television award for team 7 Tage 7 Köpfe
- 2004 German Comedy Awards, special award for 7 Tage 7 Köpfe
