= Anna Schudt =

German Emmy-winning actress (born 1974)

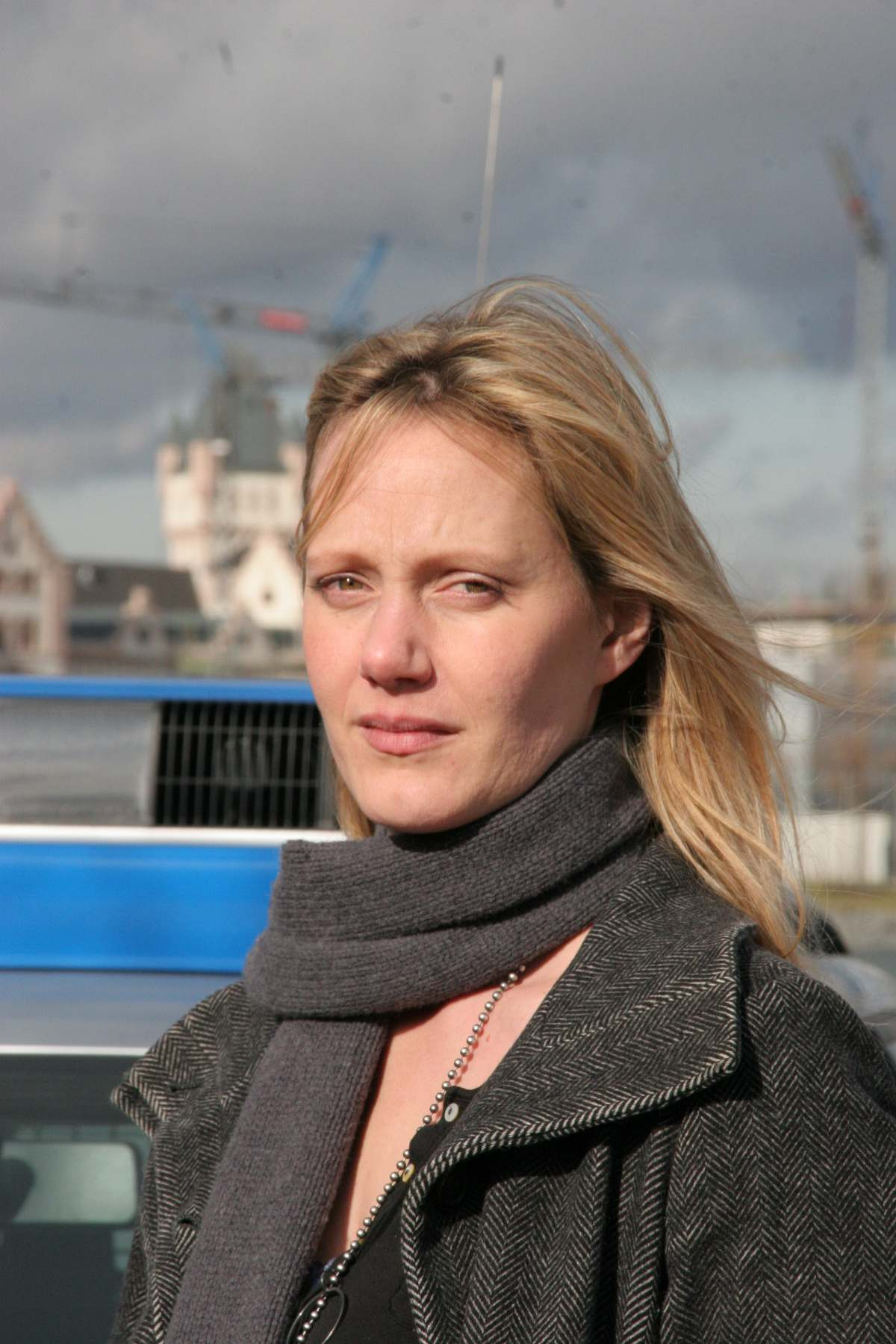
- Schudt in 2012
- Born: 23 March 1974 (age 52); Konstanz, Baden-Württemberg, West Germany
- Occupation: Actress
- Years active: 2004–present
- Spouse: Moritz Führmann
- Children: 2

Anna Schudt (born 23 March 1974) is a German Emmy-winning actress. She is internationally best known for playing comedian Gaby Köster in the television film Ein Schnupfen hätte auch gereicht.

From 2012 to 2023 she played the role of Martina Boenisch in German tv-serie Tatort.

In 2026, she played the literary agent Pia in the Netflix miniseries The Trap.
