= Franziska Traub =

German actress (born 1962)

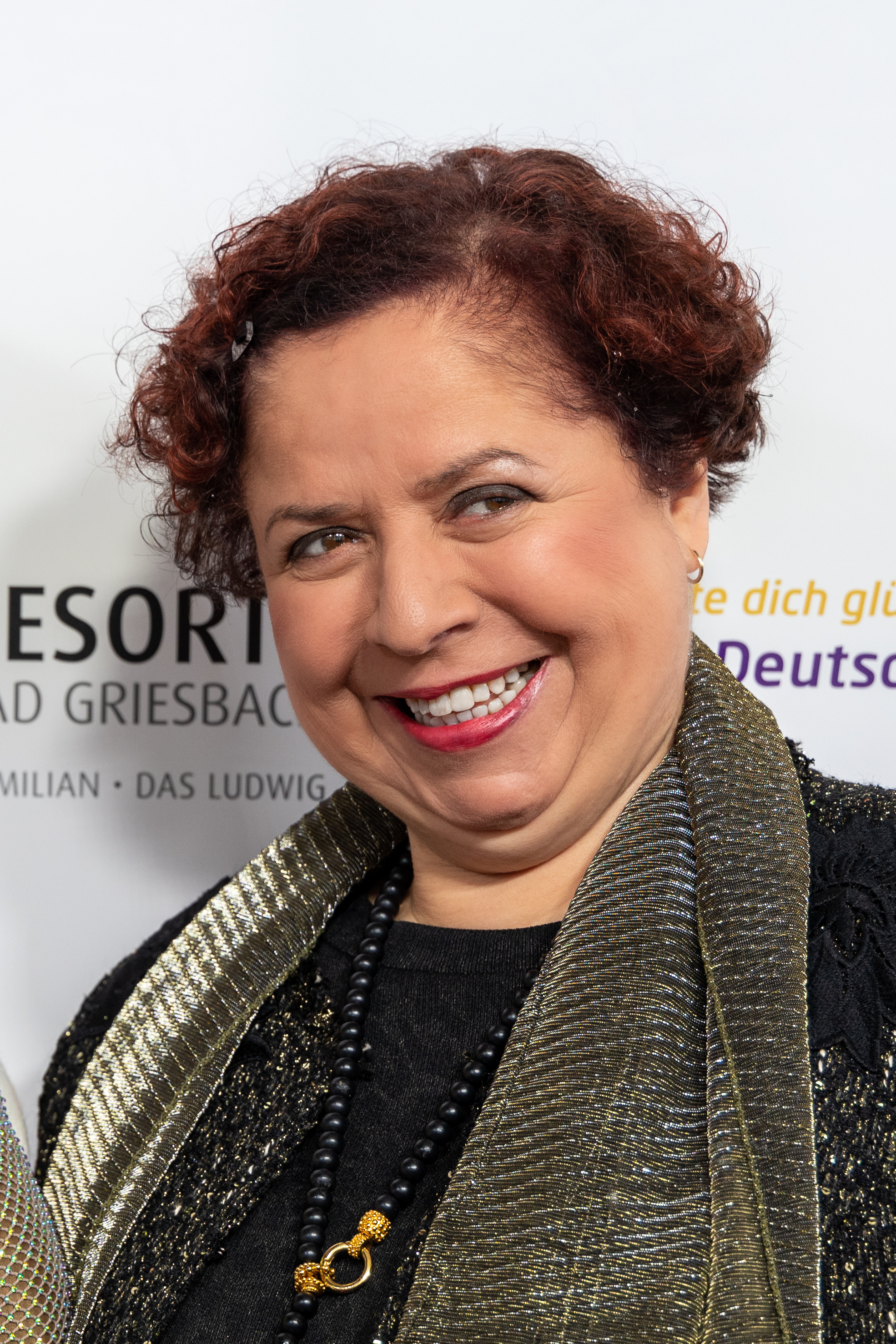
- Traub in 2023
- Born: 3 August 1962 (age 63); Stuttgart, West Germany
- Citizenship: German
- Years active: 1992–

Franziska Traub (born 3 August 1962) is a German actress.

== Life ==
Traub works as an actress for German television. In Germany she best known for her role of Gisi Wiemers in the television comedy Ritas Welt.

== Filmography ==
- 1993: Nachtschwester Kroymann
- 1988: Die zweite Heimat
- 1995: Bohai, Bohau
- 1998–2003: Ritas Welt
- 2000: Just the Beginning
- 2001: Hausmeister Krause – Ordnung muss sein
- 2003: Der kleine Mönch – Die dicke Nonne
- 2008: Das Perfekte Promi Dinner
- 2009: Pfarrer Braun
- 2009: All You Need Is Love: Meine Schwiegertochter ist ein Mann
- 2010–2011: Hand aufs Herz
- 2011: Doctor's Diary (two episodes)
- 2011: The Great Comeback
- 2011: Anna und die Liebe (one episode)
- 2015: Schmidts Katze
- 2016: Bittersweet (Bittersüss)

== Theatre ==
- Junges Theater Göttingen (1987–1989)
- Pomp, Duck and Circumstances (1990–1996)
- Chamäleon, Bar jeder Vernunft (1997–1999)
- Palazzo Colombino (1998–1999)
- Palazzo Witzigmann (2001–2002)

== Awards ==
- 2010 and 2011: German Comedy Awards for role in Ritas Welt
