= Jörg Pilawa =

German television presenter (born 1965)

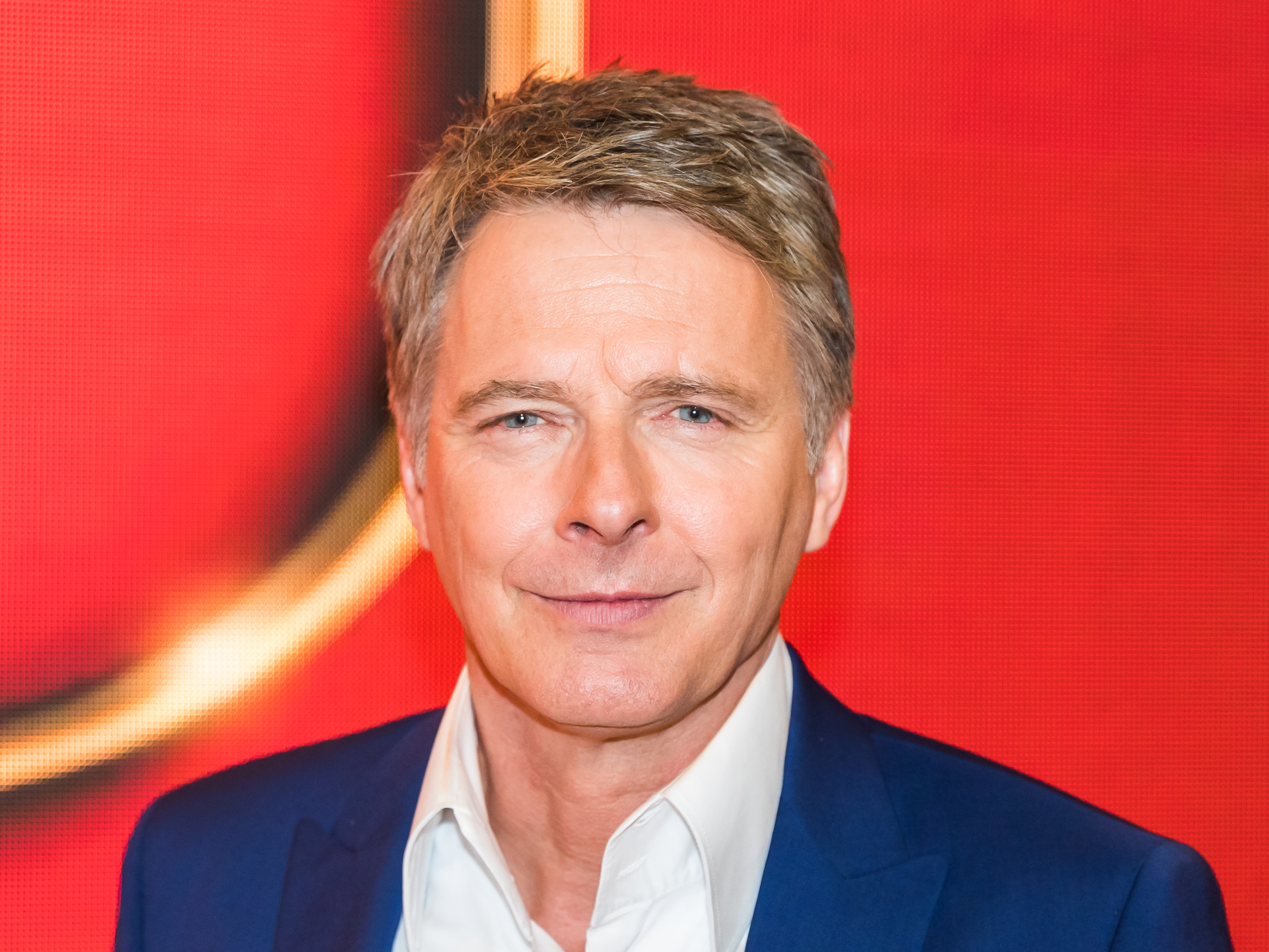
Jörg Pilawa, 2018

Jörg Michael Pilawa (born 7 September 1965, in Hamburg) is a German television presenter. He is best known as a game show host, most notably on Das Quiz mit Jörg Pilawa, Rette die Million and Das 1 % Quiz.

== Life ==
Pilawa studied after his school at Gymnasium Hummelsbüttel first medicine and then history, but he did not finish his university studies. From 1987 to 1994 Pilawa worked for Radio Schleswig-Holstein. From 1994 to 1996 Pilawa worked for German television broadcaster ProSieben and since 1996 he worked for television broadcaster SAT1. Since 2001 he worked for German broadcaster ARD and after nine years he changed to German broadcaster ZDF.

Pilawa has a son (born 1997) from his marriage to Kerstin Pilawa, which ended in divorce in 2000. With his second wife, Irina Opaschowski – a teacher and daughter of Horst W. Opaschowski – he has two daughters (born 2000 and 2011) and another son (born 2003). The family most recently lived in Hamburg-Bergedorf. The wedding took place spontaneously on 2 May 2006 in the Congo, where the Pilawas support Welthungerhilfe. Their separation became public in May 2022. In August 2025, Pilawa's relationship with CDU politician Julia Klöckner became public.

== Filmography ==
Years	Show	Channel	Genre	Notes
1995–1996	2 gegen 2	ProSieben	Game show	
1995–1996	Das goldene Ei	Sat.1	Game show	
1996–1999	Hast du Worte?	Sat.1	Game show	
1997	Wahr oder unwahr?	Sat.1	Game show	
1998–2000	Jörg Pilawa	Sat.1	Talk show	
2000–2001	Die Quiz Show	Sat.1	Game show	German version of It's Your Chance of a Lifetime
2001–2004	Herzblatt	Das Erste	Game show	German version of The Dating Game
2001–2007	NDR Talk Show	NDR Fernsehen	Talk show	
2002	Berlin, Berlin	Das Erste	Drama series	Himself; 1 episode
2002–2003	Gold, Gold, Gold	Das Erste	Game show	
	Rekordfieber	Das Erste	Variety show	
2002–2010	Das Quiz mit Jörg Pilawa	Das Erste	Game show	
2003–2005	Deutschlands größte Hits	Das Erste	Music show	
2003–2007	PISA - Der Ländertest	Das Erste	Game show	
2004	Germany, 12 points!	Das Erste	Eurovision selection	
2004–2005	Hausbesuch – Stars unter Druck	Das Erste	Game show	
2005	Der große Erziehungstest	Das Erste		
	20 Jahre Lindenstraße - Die Geburtstagsshow	Das Erste	Variety show	
2005–2008	Star-Biathlon mit Jörg Pilawa	Das Erste		
2006	Die WM Show mit Jörg Pilawa	Das Erste	Sports	
2006–2009	Frag doch mal die Maus	Das Erste	Game show	
2009	Der große Coup	Das Erste	Game show	
2009	Kennen Sie Deutschland?	Das Erste	Game show	
2010–2013	Rette die Million!	ZDF	Game show	German version of The Million Pound Drop
2011	Deutschlands fantastische Märchenshow	ZDF	Game show	
2011	Pilawas großtes Weihnachtsquiz	ZDF	Game show	
2011	Die schönsten Weihnachts-Hits	ZDF	Variety show	Substituting for Carmen Nebel
2011–2013	Deutschlands Superhirn	ZDF	Game show	
2012	Ein Herz für Kinder	ZDF	Game show	
2012	1, 2 oder 3 - Die große Jubiläumsshow	ZDF	Children's game show	
2012	Ich kann Kanzler!	ZDF	Reality game show	
2012	Der neue deutsche Bildungstest	ZDF	Game show	
2012	Die Quizshow mit Jörg Pilawa	ZDF	Game show	
2012	Der Super-Champion	ZDF	Game show	
2013	So wählt Deutschland - Pilawas Generationen-Quiz	ZDF	Game show	
2014	Einer wird gewinnen	Das Erste	Game show	
2014	Quizonkel.tv	Das Erste	Game show	
2014	Sing wie dein Star	Das Erste	Game show	German version of Tu cara me suena
2014–2021	Kaum zu glauben!	Das Erste	Panel show	
2014–2022	Quizduell	Das Erste	Game show	
2014–2022	Die NDR Quizshow	NDR Fernsehen	Game show	
2014	Am laufenden Band	NDR Fernsehen	Game show	
2015–2017	Spiel für dein Land - Das größte Quiz Europas	Das Erste	Game show	
2015–2017	Spiel für dein Land - Das größte Quiz Europas	SRF 1	Game show	
2015–2017	Spiel für dein Land - Das größte Quiz Europas	ORF 1	Game show	
2015–2020	Der klügste Norddeutsche	NDR Fernsehen	Game show	
2016	Hamburgs Journal	NDR Fernsehen	Magazine show	
2016–2017	Paarduell	Das Erste	Game show	
2016–2021	Die Silvestershow mit Jörg Pilawa	Das Erste	New Year's show	
2016–2021	Die Silvestershow mit Jörg Pilawa	Das Erste	New Year's show	
2016–2021	Die Silvestershow mit Jörg Pilawa	SRF 1	New Year's show	
2016–2021	Die Silvestershow mit Jörg Pilawa	ORF 1	New Year's show	
2017–2018	Riverboat	MDR Fernsehen	Talk show	
2017	Das Quiz der wilden Supertiere	NDR Fernsehen	Game show	
2018–2020	Ich weiß alles!	Das Erste	Game show	
2018–2020	Ich weiß alles!	SRF 1	Game show	
2018–2020	Ich weiß alles!	ORF 1	Game show	
2019	Kroymann	Das Erste	Comedy	Guest host, 1 episode
2019	Nordsee oder Ostsee?	NDR Fernsehen	Panel show	
2019	Quizzen vor acht	Das Erste	Game show	
2019–2020	Hätten Sie's gewusst?	NDR Fernsehen	Game show	
2020–2021	Das Quiz mit Jörg Pilawa	Das Erste	Game show	Revival
2020–2022	Quiz ohne Grenzen	Das Erste	Game show	
2020–2022	Quiz ohne Grenzen	SRF 1	Game show	
2020–2022	Quiz ohne Grenzen	ORF 1	Game show	
2022	Mälzer und Henssler liefern ab!	VOX	Cookery game show	Contestant
2022–present	Stars in der Manege	Sat.1	Game show	Host
2022	Quiz für Dich	Sat.1	Game show	Host
2022–2023	Zurück in die Schüle	Sat.1	Game show	Host
2022–2023	Der Sat.1-Jahresrückblick mit Jörg Pilawa	Sat.1	New Year's show	Host
2023	Die Pyramide	Sat.1	Game show	German version of Pyramid
2023–present	Das 1 % Quiz - Wie clever ist Deutschland?	Sat.1	Game show	German version of The 1% Club
2023–2024	Dating Game - Wer soll dein Herzblatt sein?	Sat.1	Dating show	German version of The Dating Game; revival
2024–present	Das große Allgemeinwissensquiz	Sat.1	Game show	

== Bibliography ==
- (with Tilmann Bendikowski) Pilawas Zeitreise : Rätselhaftes und Überraschendes aus unserer Geschichte. Köln : Kiepenheuer & Witsch, 2007. ISBN 978-3-596-18252-7

== Awards ==
- 2016: Goldene Kamera in category Best TV Entertainment
