= Bernds Hexe =

- Genre: Comedy
- Starring: Bernd Stelter; Nicole Beutler; Simon Roesberg; Max von der Groeben; Andrea Brix; H. H. Müller; Oliver Polak; Max Müller; Sophie Adell
- Country of origin: Germany
- No. of seasons: 4
- No. of episodes: 39

Production
- Running time: 25 Minutes

Original release
- Network: RTL Television
- Release: 19 April 2002

Bernds Hexe (English: Bernd's witch) is a German comedy television series about a banker who is married to a witch. The series is a joint venture between Cologne Filmproduktion GmbH and Grundy Light Entertainment. It aired on RTL in 39 episodes between 2002 and 2005.

== DVD ==
On 18 September 2006 RTL DVD released the first two seasons on DVD.

== See also ==
- List of German television series
