= Gymnasium Hummelsbüttel =

School in Hamburg, Germany

Location
- Hummelsbüttler Hauptstraße 107; Hamburg, State of Hamburg, 22339; Germany
- Coordinates: 53.64731°N 10.03991°E

Information
- Founded: 1972
- Principal: Thorsten Schüler
- Faculty: 48
- Enrollment: 565
- Website: www.gymnasium-hummelsbuettel.de

The Gymnasium Hummelsbüttel is a German high school. It is located in Hummelsbüttel, Hamburg. Gymnasium Hummelsbüttel includes the grades 5–12. In the area there are a kindergarten (Christophorus Kindergarten) and an elementary school (Grundschule Grützmühlenweg). Gymnasium Hummelsbüttel was founded in 1972. The current principal is Thorsten Schüler.

== Buildings ==
Gymnasium Hummelsbüttel includes 8 buildings:

- The schoolhouse
- 2 sports halls
- A building in which are special rooms for art, science, a theater, the canteen
- An administrative building
- The schoolhouse of Grundschule Grützmühlenweg
- Christophorus Kindergarten

== Athletics ==
Gymnasium Hummelsbüttel has competitive teams in Soccer(w/m), volleyball(w) and table tennis (m), the most successful being the volleyball team with several victories, many of them in the most recent years.

2012

Volleyball: After achieving state champions 3 consecutive times, the girls volleyball team has been eliminated in the semi finals by champions-to-be Gymnasium Heidberg and finished third.

Table Tennis: The 2011 runner up also finished third in 2012.

Soccer: the 2012 season saw the least successful results for Hummelsbüttel soccer in many years. They finished 4th out of 6th in their group, being eliminated in the preliminary round. Also the U11 and U13 indoor teams have been eliminated in early stages of tournaments.

== Notable alumni ==
- Otto Addo Ghanaian soccer player
- Jörg Pilawa German game show host
