= Katharina Wackernagel =

German actress (born 1978)

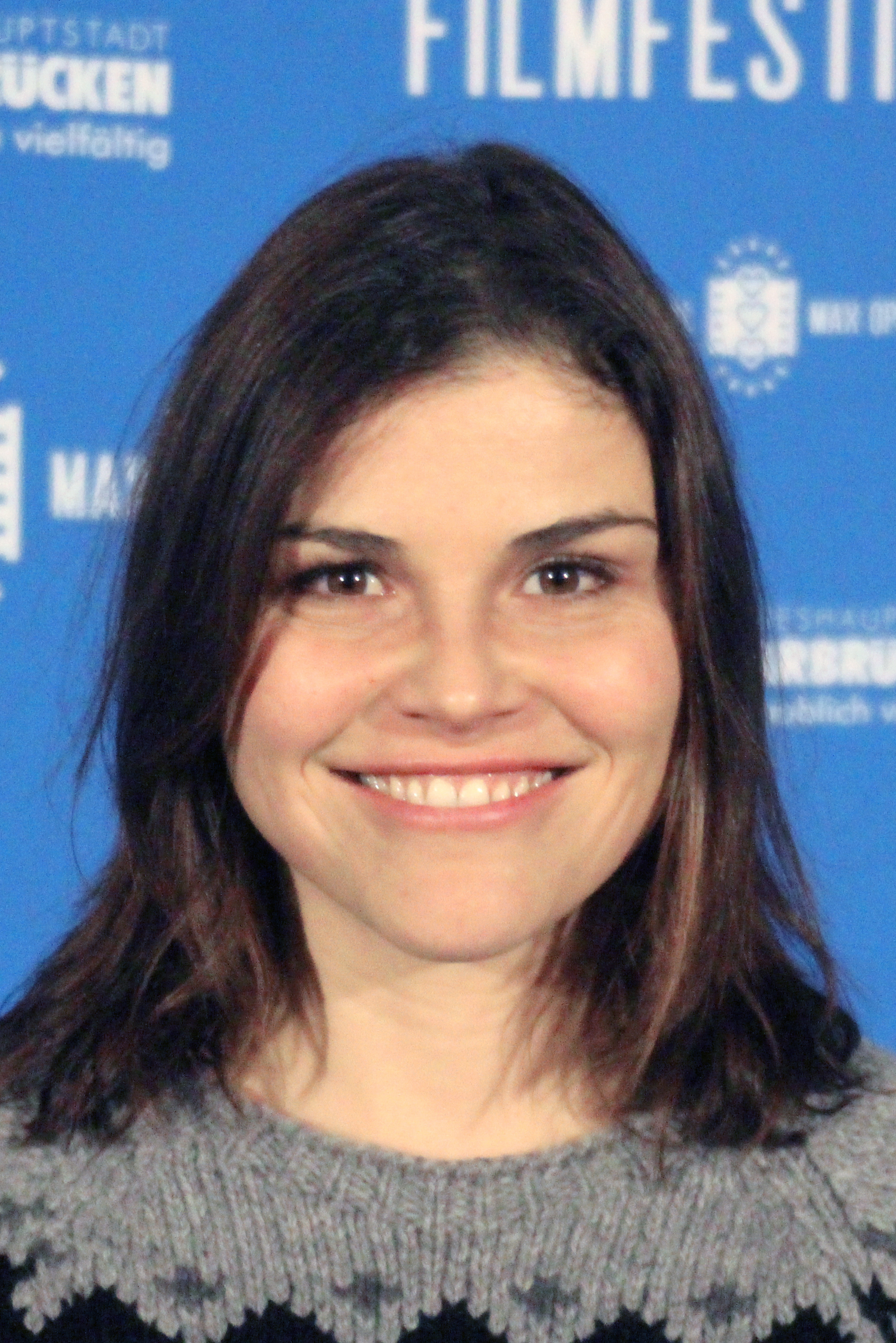
- Wackernagel in 2015
- Born: 15 October 1978; Freiburg im Breisgau, West Germany
- Occupation: Actress

Katharina Wackernagel (born 15 October 1978 in Freiburg im Breisgau) is a German actress. She had her acting breakthrough in 1997 with the lead role in the German young adult TV show Tanja. She is also known from her role starting in 2009 as Commissioner Nina Petersen in the German crime TV show Stralsund.

== Family and private life ==
Wackernagel is the daughter of actress Sabine Wackernagel and actor and director Valentin Jeker, and her grandmother is actress Erika Wackernagel. Her half-brother is actor and screenwriter Jonas Grosch, and her uncle is the author, actor, and former Red Army Faction member Christof Wackernagel. She went to school in Kassel from 1983 to 1996, and had already formed her own acting troop at age 7. She moved to Berlin in 1998 and lived for years with her half-brother.

== Acting ==
Wackernagel made her film debut in 1995 in the short film Allerseelen. In 1997, she landed the lead and title role on the German series Tanja directed by Berengar Pfahl, for which she won the RTL Golden Lion best actress in a series award in 1998. In the German TV series Bloch, she played the role of the daughter of Dr. Maximilian Bloch from 2002 to 2008. She first got wide attention for a film role in the popular 2003 German movie The Miracle of Bern, which is about West Germany's underdog victory in the 1954 FIFA World Cup final.

From 2009 until 2022, she played the role of Commissioner Nina Petersen in the German crime TV show Stralsund. In 2021, she was cast as Commissioner Marie Gabler in the German satirical crime show Mord mit Aussicht (Murder with a View). She has also appeared in other films and numerous other TV shows on German television, and has co-produced films with her half-brother including Die letzte Lüge and A Silent Rockumentary. In 2018, her first feature film as a director was released, Wenn Fliegen träumen.

She has also been nominated for and received other German acting awards, such as the Hessian television award for best performance in 2008 for Mein Mörder kommt zurück, and the Askania Award in 2018 for best actress.
