= Eternal Winter =

2018 film by Attila Szász

- Directed by: Attila Szász
- Written by: Attila Szász; Norbert Köbli
- Produced by: Szupermodern Stúdió
- Starring: Marina Gera; Sándor Csányi; Laura Döbrösi
- Cinematography: András Nagy
- Edited by: László Hargittai
- Music by: Gergely Parádi
- Release date: 30 January 2018 (Budapest)
- Running time: 110 minutes
- Country: Hungary
- Languages: Hungarian; Russian

Eternal Winter (Hungarian: Örök tél) is a 2018 Hungarian drama film about the program of forced labor of Hungarians in the Soviet Union in the aftermath of World War II. It was directed by Attila Szász Marina Gera won the International Emmy Award for best actress for her performance as Irén.

== Cast ==
- Marina Gera - Irén
- Sándor Csányi - Rajmund
- Laura Döbrösi - Anna
- Diána Magdolna Kiss - Éva
