= Ein Schnupfen hätte auch gereicht =

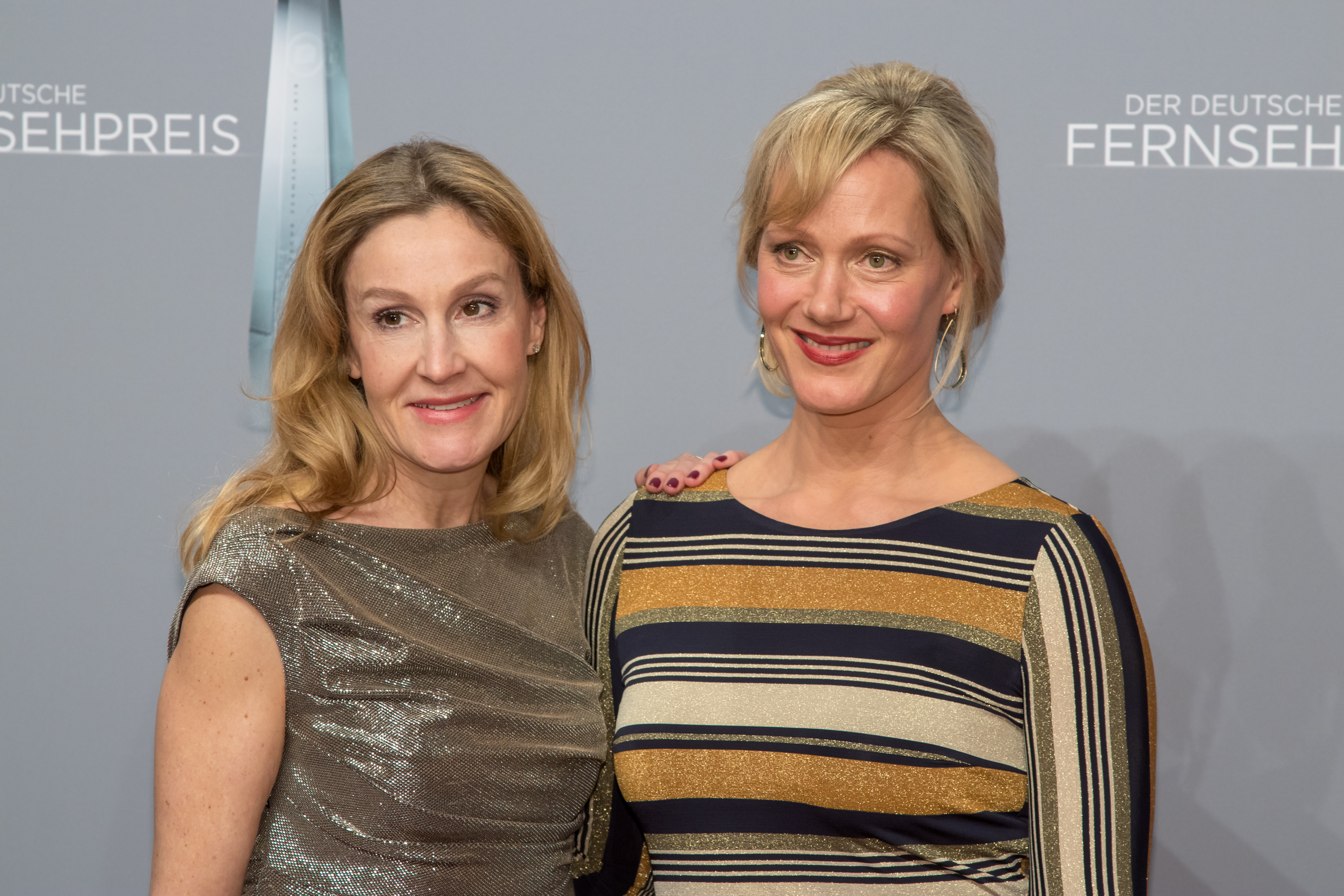
- Christine Hartmann and Anna Schudt in the 2018 Deutscher Fernsehpreis.
- Screenplay by: Rodica Doehnert; Gaby Köster; Gerd Lurz
- Directed by: Christine Hartmann
- Starring: Anna Schudt
- Music by: Frederik Wiedmann
- Country of origin: Germany

Production
- Cinematography: Stephan Schuh
- Editor: Cosima Schnell
- Running time: 90 minutes

Original release
- Release: 14 April 2017

Ein Schnupfen hätte auch gereicht (lit. 'A cold would have been enough') is a 2017 German television film directed by Christine Hartmann about the life of actress and comedian Gaby Köster played by Anna Schudt.

== Cast ==
- Anna Schudt ... Gaby Köster
- Stephan Grossmann ... Adrian Schmitt
- Jasmin Schwiers ... Jackie
- Moritz Bäckerling ... Donald
- Ludwig Hansmann ... Severin
- Aslan Aslan ... Jesus / Michael
- Hella von Sinnen ... Hella von Sinnen
- Hugo Egon Balder ... Hugo Egon Balder
- Clemens Giebel ... Aufnahmeleiter
- Mike Krüger ... Mike Krüger

== Accolades ==
Anna Schudt received a nomination for best actress at the German Television Award 2018 for her role in Ein Schnupfen. She won the 2018 International Emmy Award as best actress.
