= Django Asül =

Turkish-German actor and comedian

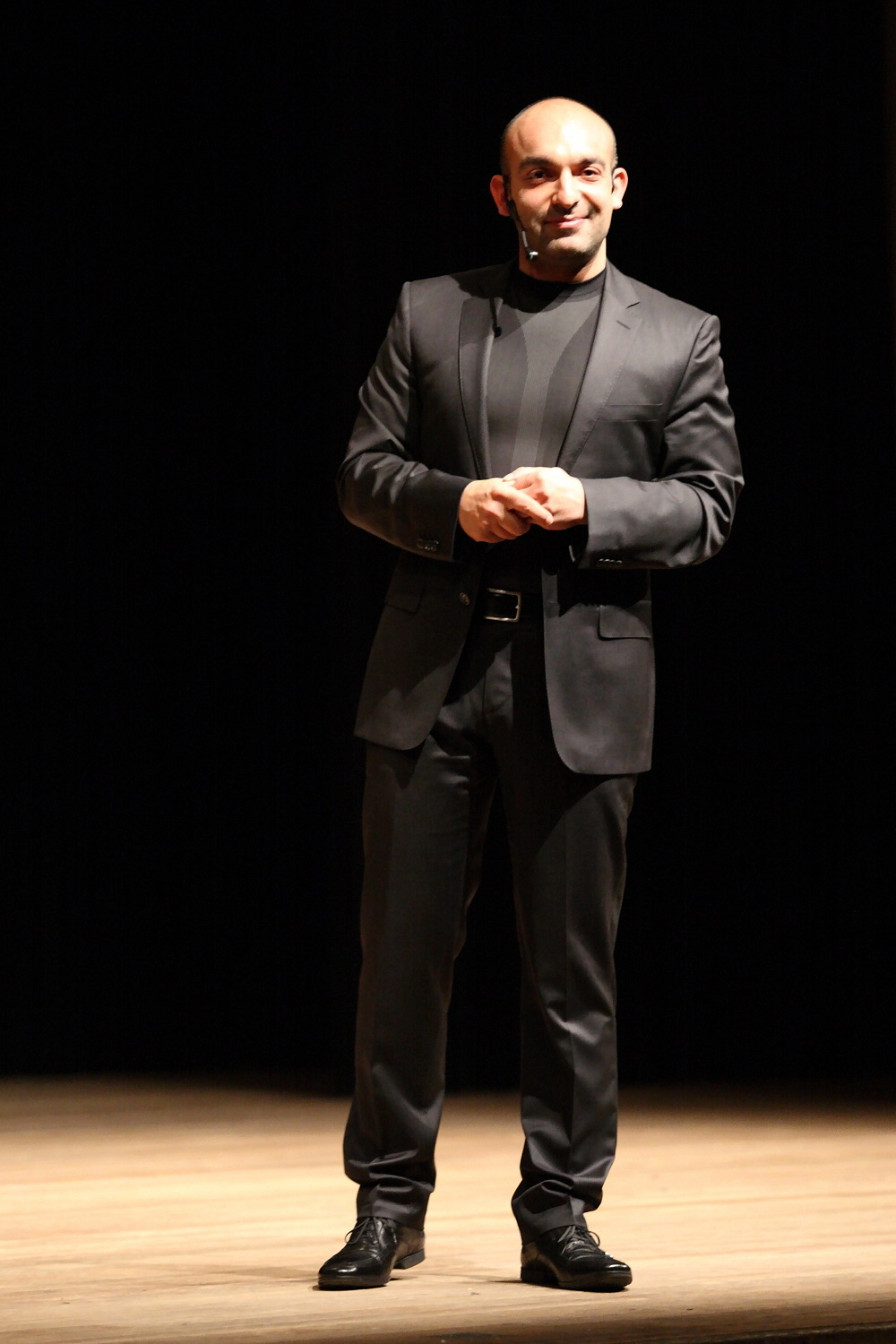
- Born: Uğur Bağışlayıcı; April 19, 1972 (age 54); Hengersberg, Lower Bavaria, West Germany.
- Years active: 1997–present
- Website: http://www.django-asuel.de/

Django Asül (born April 19, 1972) is a Turkish-German actor and comedian.

== Standup comedy ==
Asül first became known for his standup comedy routines, which were later released on CD. In these routines, he alternates between different voices: a narrator-persona who speaks a standard German with a light Bavarian accent switches to a strong lower Bavarian dialect or a broken German with Turkish accent to represent different speakers in various imagined dialogues. These alternating perspectives allow him to explore social and political themes which include but are by no means mainly focussed on the intercultural issues involved in being a Turk in Germany.

== Filmography ==
=== Television ===
Year	Film	Role	Notes
2009	Hanna und die Bankräuber	Kommissar Schneider	
2007	Tatort	Platzwart	1 episode
2005	Brutto wie netto		
2003	Die Rosenheim-Cops	Peter Schlatner	1 episode
2002	Café Meineid	Achmed Sanclacy	1 episode

== CD releases ==
- Hämokratie, CD, Zampano (BMG), November 1999
- Autark, CD, Zampano (BMG), October 2001
- Hardliner, CD, Zampano (BMG), September 2004
- Fragil, CD, Sony BMG, 6. February 2009

== Book publications ==
- Oh Abendland!, Lichtung-Verl., 1997

== Awards ==
- 1996: Kabarett Kaktus
- 1997: Obernburger Mühlstein Jury- und Publikumspreis
- 1998: Ravensburger Kupferle
- 2000: Bayerischer Kabarettpreis
- 2005: Ybbser Spaßvogel
- 2007: Kulturnews
