= Das Quiz mit Jörg Pilawa =

- Genre: Quiz show
- Presented by: Jörg Pilawa
- Composer: Frank Ryan Graves
- Country of origin: Germany
- No. of episodes: 1,795

Original release
- Network: Das Erste
- Release: 25 July 2001 – 7 September 2010
- Release: 30 November 2020 – 15 April 2021

Das Quiz mit Jörg Pilawa was a German quiz show broadcast on Tuesdays to Fridays on Das Erste from 25 July 2001 to 7 September 2010, and again from Monday to Friday from 30 November 2020 to 15 April 2021.

The show was piloted in the UK under the name Veto, hosted by Esther McVey, but was not commissioned.

== Gameplay ==
One pair of contestants plays a series of multiple-choice questions, each with four possible answers. Both contestants take turns to give a first answer to each question and may not confer. After the answer has been locked in, the other contestant may veto the original answer if they do not agree with it and replace it with one of their own. Each pair has four vetos, one of which is the Tauschveto (translated in the UK pilot as "Question Veto"), which swaps the question for another one of the same difficulty. The pair has the option to use the Tauschveto as a normal veto instead, but only once the three other normal vetoes have already been used. If all the vetoes have been used, only one contestant may answer each question.

Similarly to Who Wants to Be a Millionaire?, each correct answer brings the contestants one step up the money ladder. They have two safety nets in the original version and one in the 2020 reboot. Teams cannot walk away once a question has been read out, so they must decide whether to play before seeing what the question is.

In the 2020 reboot, the contestants had ten seconds to answer a quiz question before playing the game. If they answered correctly, the contestants would have a wish granted that they had previously submitted to producers on a 'wish card' and would go on to play the game as before. If they answered incorrectly or not in time, the contestants would leave empty-handed.

This was changed from 3 March 2021 as the wish question was replaced by a short qualifying round, in which two pairs of contestants would be asked a series of multiple-choice questions for ten seconds each, with the first to reach seven correct answers being allowed to play the game.

== Money tree ==
| # | 2001 | 2002-2010 | 2020-2021 |
|---|---|---|---|
| 1 | 500 DM | €500 | €100 |
| 2 | 1,000 DM | €1,000 | €500 |
| 3 | 2,000 DM | €2,000 | €1,000 |
| 4 | 3,000 DM | €3,000 | €2,000 |
| 5 | 5,000 DM | €5,000 | €3,000 |
| 6 | 10,000 DM | €10,000 | €5,000 |
| 7 | 20,000 DM | €15,000 | €7,500 |
| 8 | 30,000 DM | €20,000 | €10,000 |
| 9 | 50,000 DM | €30,000 | €15,000 |
| 10 | 100,000 DM | €50,000 | €20,000 |
| 11 | 250,000 DM | €100,000 | €30,000 |
| 12 | 500,000 DM | €300,000 | €50,000 |

The safety nets in the original version were usually set at 5.000 DM/€5,000 and 30.000 DM/€30,000, the highest being set at €30,000 and €100,000. In the revival, the lone safety net was most often set at €5,000 or €7,500, the highest being set at €10,000.
