= Motorrad (film) =

2017 film

- Theatrical release poster
- Directed by: Vicente Amorim
- Written by: Vicente Amorim
- Story by: L. G. Tubaldini Jr
- Produced by: L. G. Tubaldini Jr
- Starring: Carla Salle
- Production company: Filmland International
- Distributed by: Warner Bros. Pictures
- Release dates: 9 September 2017 (TIFF); 1 March 2018 (Brazil)
- Country: Brazil
- Language: Portuguese

Motorrad is a 2017 Brazilian thriller film directed by Vicente Amorim. It was screened in the Contemporary World Cinema section at the 2017 Toronto International Film Festival. The film had concept art of by Brazilian comic artist Danilo Beyruth.

== Cast ==
- Carla Salle as Paula
- Pablo Sanábio as Tomás
- Juliana Lohmann as Bia
- Emílio de Mello as Ricardo
- Guilherme Prates as Hugo
