= Ritas Welt =

- Genre: Sitcom
- Created by: Thomas Koch; Michael Gantenberg; Peter Freiberg
- Starring: Gaby Köster; Frank Vockroth; Franziska Traub; Lutz Herkenrath; Georg Alfred Wittner; Marius Theobald; Kevin Lorenz (episodes 1–32); Dustin Semmelrogge (episodes 30–68); Jasmin Schwiers (episodes 1–29); Marie-Helen Dehorn (episodes 30–42)
- Country of origin: Germany
- Original language: German
- No. of seasons: 5
- No. of episodes: 68

Production
- Running time: 30 minutes
- Production company: Columbia TriStar Film und Fernseh Produktions GmbH

Original release
- Network: RTL Television
- Release: 17 September 1999 – 19 December 2003

Ritas Welt (English: Rita's World) is a German television sitcom produced by the German division of Columbia TriStar Television that premiered on RTL on 17 September 1999 and ended its run after five successful seasons on 19 December 2003. Starring Gaby Köster, the show was about a confident sales assistant, Rita Kruse; her fight with her self-righteous boss, Achim Schuhmann (Lutz Herkenrath); and her life with her loving husband Horst (Frank Vockroth) and their two children, Sandra (Jasmin Schwiers) and Markus (Marius Theobald). Through it all, Rita is supported by her wacky best friend Gisi Wiemers (Franziska Traub).

== See also ==
- List of German television series
