= Deadline – Jede Sekunde zählt =

- Country of origin: Germany

Deadline – Jede Sekunde zählt is a German television series.

== See also ==
- List of German television series
