= Psi (TV series) =

- Created by: Contardo Calligaris
- Starring: Emílio de Mello; Claudia Ohana; Otávio Martins
- Country of origin: Brazil
- Original language: Portuguese
- No. of seasons: 4
- No. of episodes: 32

Production
- Running time: 50 minutes

Original release
- Network: HBO Brasil
- Release: March 24, 2014 – present

Psi is a Brazilian television series created by Contardo Calligaris and produced by HBO Brasil. Its first episode aired on 23 March 2014. A third season was confirmed in 2016, expected to debut in 2017.

== Plot ==
Carlo Antonini (Emílio de Mello), a psychoanalyst, psychologist and psychiatrist, works in São Paulo. While working at his clinic and relating to his ex-wife, his son, and two stepchildren, he lends himself to investigate on his own, in the vacant hours, crimes and complex cases of the city.

In the third season of the series, Denise played an accumulating patient who must deal with her mother's imminent death. With the help of Carlo, she discovers a family secret kept long ago. The two episodes starring Denise were directed by Luciano Moura.

== Cast ==
- Emílio de Mello ... Carlo Antonini
- Cláudia Ohana ... Valentina
- Raul Barretto ... Severino ou Caronte
- Aída Leiner ... Flávia
- Igor Armucho...Henrique
- Victor Mendes ... Mark
- Paula Picarelli...Taís
- Camila Leccioli...Janaína

== Awards ==
Year	Award	Category	Result
2015	43rd International Emmy Awards	Best Drama Series	Nominated
2015	43rd International Emmy Awards	Best Performance by an Actor (Emílio de Mello)	Nominated
2018	46th International Emmy Awards	Best Performance by an Actress Denise Weinberg	Nominated
