= Mike Krüger =

German comedian (born 1951)

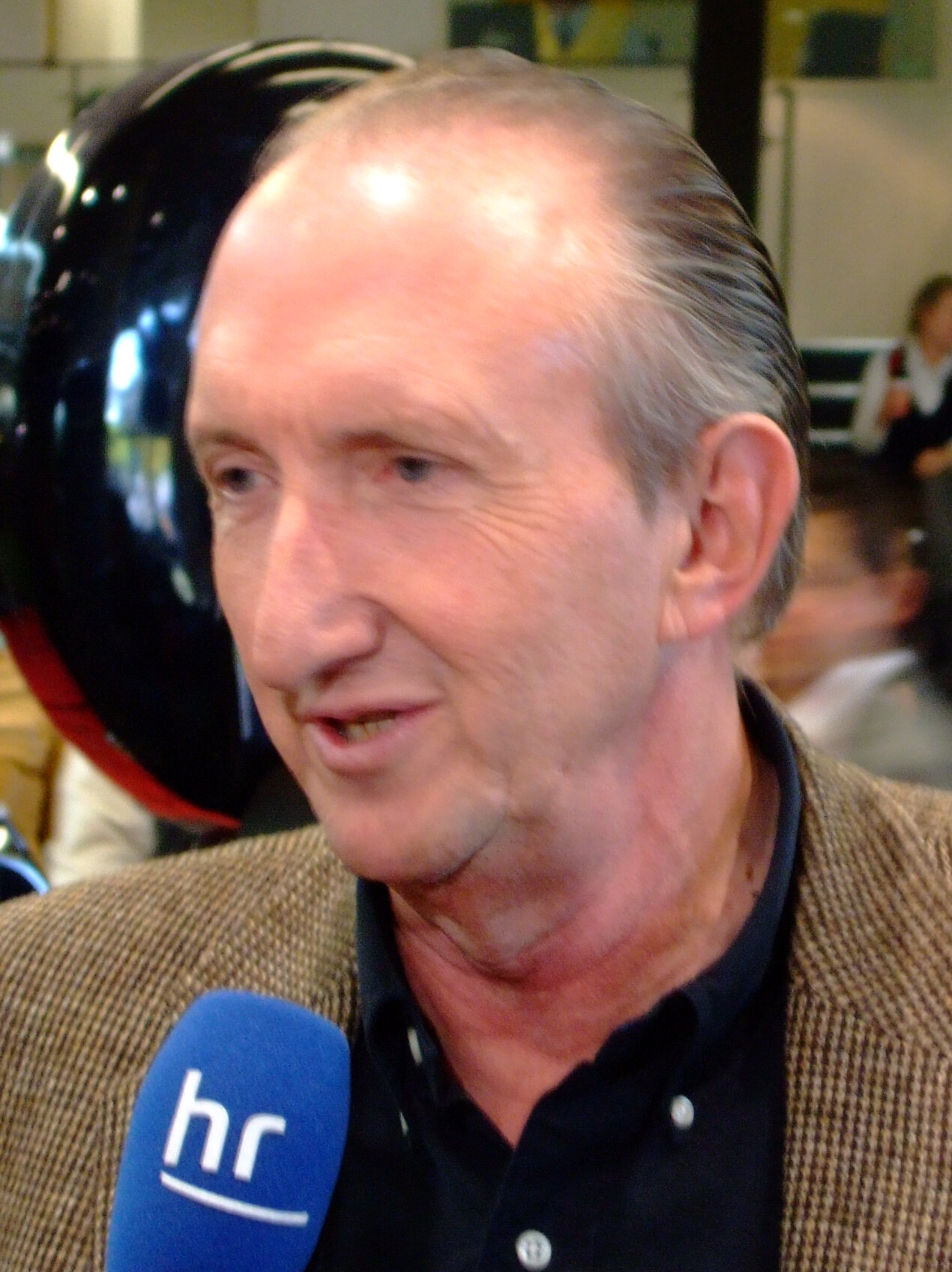
- Krüger in 2008
- Born: Michael Friedrich Wilhelm Krüger; 14 December 1951 (age 74); Ulm, West Germany
- Occupations: Comedian, actor, singer

Comedy career
- Medium: Stand-up, television, film, music
- Website: mike-krueger.de

Signature
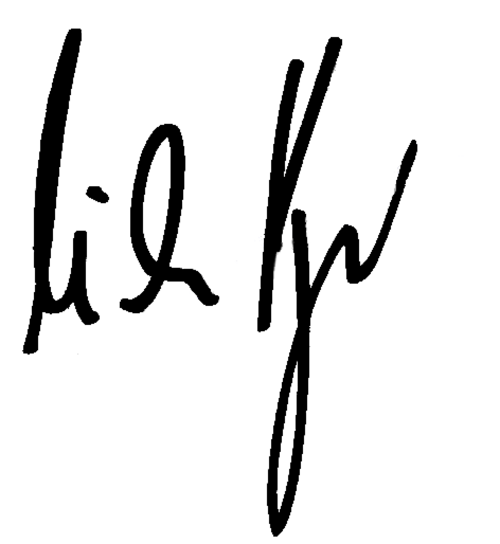

Michael Friedrich Wilhelm Krüger (born 14 December 1951) is a German comedian, actor, kabarett artist, and singer.

== Filmography ==
- Piratensender Powerplay (1981)
- Die Supernasen (1983)
- Zwei Nasen tanken Super (1984)
- Seitenstechen (1985)
- Die Einsteiger (1985)
- Geld oder Leber! (1986)
- Die Senkrechtstarter (1989)
- Ein Schnupfen hätte auch gereicht (2017)
