= Gaby Köster =

German actress and comedian

Gabriele Wilhelmine Köster
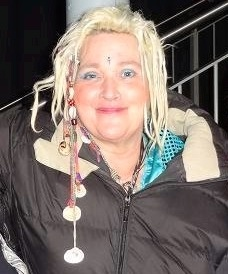
- Köster in 2013
- Born: Cologne, West Germany
- Occupations: Actress; comedian
- Website: gabykoester.de

Gabriele Wilhelmine "Gaby" Köster (German pronunciation: [ˈɡaːbiː ˈkʰœstʰɐ]) is a German actress and comedian.

== Life ==
Köster was born in Cologne, West Germany. Following secondary school, Köster began training to become a nursery-school teacher, which she broke off three weeks prior to completion. She then dedicated herself to music and painting, and some of her paintings were shown in exhibitions. To keep her head above water financially, she also worked in a bar where, in 1987, she met Jürgen Becker. Becker asked her to write a few sketches for a radio programme. Köster thought the guest was crazy but still wrote a sketch. She was surprised when the text she had submitted was actually used on the German radio station WDR in the programme Unterhaltung am Wochenende, broadcast on Saturdays between 4 and 6 pm. Regular radio appearances and subsequently her own programmes were to follow.

Köster appeared on WDR television for the first time in 1991. She was a member of the cast of the alternative Cologne Carnival stage show between 1991 and 1995. Her somewhat bawdy humour is heightened by her Kölsch dialect.

Köster became known to a wider television audience through guest appearances on RTL Samstag Nacht. From 1996 until its discontinuation in 2005, she was a permanent cast member of the show 7 Tage, 7 Köpfe, produced by Rudi Carrell. Between 1999 and 2003, she also played the title role of "Rita Kruse" in the comedy series Ritas Welt. One of her last appearances was in December 2007 in a show produced by ProSieben, celebrating 20 years on stage of Michael Mittermeier.

At the beginning of 2008, Köster cancelled her Wer Sahne will, muss Kühe schütteln tour, which had only started a few weeks before. All other performance dates were later also cancelled. A media blackout prevented any information about Köster becoming available to the public. Her management took legal action against newspaper reports regarding an alleged illness.

It was revealed in early September 2011 that Köster had suffered a stroke on 8 January 2008, the effects of which were still physically debilitating. She appeared on 7 September 2011 for the first time again following her stroke on the RTL Television programme stern TV. Together with Till Hoheneder, Köster wrote the book Ein Schnupfen hätte auch gereicht – meine zweite Chance about her stroke and the time that followed. She also narrated the audiobook version. During this period, only Stern and stern TV were allowed to publish up-to-date pictures of her.

Köster lives in Cologne and has a son from her former marriage with director Thomas Köller.

== Selected filmography ==
List of appearances, with year, title, and role shown
Year	Title	Role	Notes
1996–2005	7 Tage, 7 Köpfe		TV series
1999–2003	Ritas Welt	Rita Kruse	TV series
2017	Ein Schnupfen hätte auch gereicht		Tv movie

== Awards and recognition ==
- 1996: Gilden Kölsch Award
- 1998: Bambi Award - Publikumspreis Best Comedy Show for 7 Tage, 7 Köpfe
- 1998: Goldener Löwe for 7 Tage, 7 Köpfe
- 1999: Deutscher Comedypreis - Best Comedian
- 1999: Goldener Gong television award for the team behind 7 Tage, 7 Köpfe
- 2000: Adolf-Grimme-Preis as comedian in Ritas Welt
- 2000: Deutscher Comedypreis for Ritas Welt
- 2000: Deutscher Fernsehpreis -Best Television Series Actress
- 2003: Deutscher Comedypreis - Best Comedy Actress
- 2007: Deutscher Comedypreis - Best Comedian

== Books ==
- 2011: with Till Hoheneder: Ein Schnupfen hätte auch gereicht – Meine zweite Chance. Scherz, Frankfurt am Main, ISBN 978-3-502-15188-3
- 2015: Die Chefin. Novel, Pendo, Munich, ISBN 978-3-86612-372-4
- 2019: with Till Hoheneder: Das Leben ist großartig – von einfach war nie die Rede. Ullstein leben, Berlin, ISBN 978-3-96366-066-5
