= Thomas Stavros =

- Born: November 22, 1974 (age 51)
- Occupation: Showrunner

Thomas Stavros (São Paulo, SP, November 22, 1974) is a Brazilian screenwriter, actor and film producer.

== Biography ==
Creator of the award-winning TV series 1 Against All, Stavros began his career writing, directing and producing for the theater. In his first play in 2001 – Clube Privê – A Comedy in the Foolish 70's His last play was the musical Ceará Show – Agora eu Conheço, written in 2016 in partnership with Silvio Guindane, receiving 11 nominations for the Quimera Theater Award, earning 6, among them Best Play and Best Author.

Stavros founded the production company Produção Carioca.

He creates the TV series 1 Against All, where he is also the screenwriter. Produced by Conspiração Filmes for Fox Brazil and Latin America, directed by Breno Silveira. It was considered by the media as the Brazilian Breaking Bad. Well-received by the public since the beginning, 1 Against All became the most watched brasilian series on pay TV in its first season and achieved excellent repercussions throughout Latin America.

Over 4 seasons,1 Against All increased the channel's audience by 74%, and received several awards, in addition to important national and international nominations: 2 times nominated for best drama series to the International Emmy, Golden Nymph Award, ABRA Screenplay Award. APCA Award and more. The protagonist Julio Andrade was also nominated for the International Emmy for his performance in the series. After so much success in Latin America, the series will have a remake produced in Mexico, entirely in Spanish.

Stavros signs the series The Negotiator, as creator and screenwriter. Directed by Bel Valiante and produced by Boutique Filmes for Amazon Prime Video, it stars Malvino Salvador as main character.

He also wrote the TV series Acerto de Contas, produced by Mariza Leão and directed by José Joffily for Multishow, beating audience record for the channel, and Sem Volta, the first action and adventure TV series in Brazil, a super production of Record TV, together with Gustavo Lipsztein.

In the cinema´s industry, he signed on as showrunner – where he is creator, screenwriter and producer, the biography of the world champion boxer Eder Jofre for the movie 10 Seconds to Win. Produced by Globo Filmes, TV Globo and Tambellini Filmes, directed by José Alvarenga Jr. The movie was awarded by 2 Kikitos at the Gramado Film Festival and he was the big winner at the Lapa Film Festival, taking 6 statuettes, including Best Film (popular jury), Best Film (official jury) and Best Screenplay. It has also won several international awards, including the Toronto Lift-Off Film Festival.

10 Seconds also premiered in a 4-episode miniseries format on TV Globo with a record audience.

Stavros also collaborated with Breno Silveira on Gonzaga – de Pai para Filho.

Stavros wrote the movie Federal Police – No One is Above the Law, directed by Marcelo Antunez, hitting the brazilian box office record of that year.

He also wrote the feature movie 2 Shots of Tequila, directed by Juan Zapata, which will be filmed in Los Angeles in 2023.

Currently develops 1 TV Series for HBO Max as Showrunner and the feature movie "Malandragem uma um Tempo", based on the biography of singer Bezerra da Silva.

== Filmography ==
Year	Title	Credits	Platform
2012	Gonzaga – de Pai para Filho	Collaborating Writer	Movie Theater
2014	Acerto de Contas	Writer	Multishow
2016	Ceará Show – Agora eu Conheço	Writer	Theater
2016	Sem Volta	Writer	Record TV
2016	1 Against All – Season 1	Creator and Writer	FOX+ / STAR+
2017	Federal Police – No One is Above the Law	Writer	Movie Theater
2017	1 Against All – Season 2	Creator and Writer	FOX+ / STAR+
2018	10 Segundos Para Vencer - movie	Showrunner - Producer, Creator and Writer	Movie Theater
2018	1 Against All – Season 3	Creator and Writer	FOX+ / STAR+
2019	10 Segundos Para Vencer - miniseries	Showrunner - Producer, Creator and Writer	TV Globo
2020	1 Against All – Season 4	Creator and Writer	FOX+ / STAR+
2022	The Negociator	Creator and Writer	Amazon Prime Video
2023	Malandragem dá um Tempo	Showrunner - Producer, Creator and Writer	Movie Theater
2023	2 Shots of Tequila	Writer	Movie Theater
2023	"unnamed"	Showrunner - Producer, Creator and Writer	HBO Max
