= 1 Contra Todos =

- Genre: Drama
- Created by: Gustavo Lipsztein; Thomas Stavros; Breno Silveira
- Starring: Júlio Andrade; Julia Ianina; Julia Konrad; Silvio Guindane; Thogun Teixeira; Stepan Nercessian; Xando Graça; Roberto Birindelli
- Opening theme: "Não Existe Amor em SP"
- Composer: Criolo
- Country of origin: Brazil
- Original language: Portuguese
- No. of seasons: 4
- No. of episodes: 32

Production
- Executive producers: Gustavo Baldoni; Renata Brandão; Breno Silveira; Maria Amélia M.P. Leão Teixeira
- Production location: São Paulo
- Running time: 45 minutes
- Production companies: Conspiração Filmes; Fox Networks Group

Original release
- Network: Fox Channel Brazil
- Release: 20 June 2016 – 27 March 2020

1 Contra Todos (lit.: One Against All) is a Brazilian drama television series produced by FIC and Conspiração Filmes and aired by FOX Brasil.

The series is written by Thomas Stavros, Gustavo Lipsztein and Breno Silveira. Breno Silveira directed the episodes, with script by Thomas Stavros and Gustavo Lipsztein.

The series was nominated three consecutive years for the International Emmy Award, in 2017 and 2018 for Best Performance by an Actor for Júlio Andrade, and in 2018 and 2019 for Best Drama Series for its second and third season.

The fourth and final season will air in 2020, after a hiatus of almost two years. The renovation was made in 2018, and the new season was shot in 2019 and will end the series plot.

== Synopsis ==
=== Season 1 ===
Cadu (Júlio Andrade), who is about to become a father for the second time, loses his job. His situation becomes even more complicated when, by mistake, he is unjustly condemned for the crime of drug trafficking in Taubaté, in the interior of São Paulo. Trying to survive the prison, he is forced to lie and to engage in criminal behavior. He has the help of Professor (Adélio Lima), a man who has been imprisoned for more than 25 years for trafficking and murder. Considered a counselor inside the penitentiary, he knows everything that goes on inside. Believing that Cadu is innocent, Professor becomes a father figure to him. The former lawyer also has the support of China (Thogun Teixeira) and Mom (Sílvio Guindane). The first, convicted of murder, believes in his lies, which leads him to become his friend and personal security guard, risking his own life to protect the 'Doctor of Traffic'. The second, convicted of attempted murder, follows the orders of China, chief of the cell where he is being held. On the other hand, the arrival of Cadu makes Playboy (Sacha Bali), convicted of bank robbery and gang formation, to lose his position in the chain hierarchy, which makes this ambitious young man become an enemy of Cadu. The penitentiary is under the command of the director Demosthenes (Adriano Garib), an ambitious and corrupt man who transforms the life of Cadu into a hell. Meanwhile, his wife Malu (Julia Ianina), willing to do anything to save her husband, enters the charade of Cadu's new identity and becomes the 'first lady' of drug trafficking. The case of Cadu is still investigated by Jonas (Caio Junqueira), a federal police officer who has been working for years to raise evidence against the Santa Cruz de La Sierra Cartel. Reason why you believe in the innocence of Cadu.

== Cast ==
Ator	Personagem
Júlio Andrade	Doutor (Carlos Eduardo Fortuna)
Júlia Ianina	Malu (Maria Luísa Fortuna)
Julia Konrad	Pepita
Caio Junqueira	Jonas
Adriano Garib	Diretor Demóstenes
Roney Villela	Santa Rosa
Sacha Bali	Playboy (Luís Paulo Filho)
Sílvio Guindane	Mãe (Abelardo Ferreira da Silva)
Adélio Lima	Professor (Nilo Ferreira da Cruz)
Thogun Teixeira	China (João Paripuera dos Santos)
Gustavo Novaes	Faz Nada (Marcelo da Figueira)
Roberto Birindelli	Pepe (José Pedro)
Stepan Nercessian	Simões Lobo
Xando Graça	JP
Luiz Felipe Mello	Téo Fortuna
Felipe de Paula	Valadares
Júlio Machado	Magrão
William Vorhees	Alemão
Élcio Romar	Dr. Samir
Anna Cotrim	Sônia
Antônio Sabóia	Cabo Euclides
Rômulo Neto	Maicon
Gabriel Manita	Marlon
Glauber Gonzales	Tião
Leandro Santana	Maciel
Edi Raffa	Estrela
Mito Pontual	Germano
Raphael Logam	Orelha
João Victor Sales	Pedro
Thiago Gaudêncio	Parede

== Episodes ==
=== Season 1 (2016) ===
1. A Justiça é Cega (Justice is Blind)
2. Lei Vem do Rei (Law Comes from the King)
3. Caminho do Crime (Crime path)
4. Reino Encantado (Enchanted Kingdom)
5. Dr X Dr
6. Verdade Não Se Cria (Truth is not created)
7. A Final (The Final)
8. Agora é Contra Todos (Now it's against everyone)

=== Season 2 (2017) ===
1. A Prisão É Para Sempre (Prison is forever)
2. O Caça-Deputados (The Deputy Hunter)
3. Ícaro (Icarus)
4. Pais e filhos (Fathers and Sons)
5. Mensageiro da Verdade (Menssenger of the truth)
6. Veneno da lata (Poison in a can)
7. Brincadeira de gente grande (Big people's play)
8. Fim da estrada (The end of the road)

=== Season 3 (2018) ===
1. A Mentira é a Verdade (The Lie is the Truth)
2. Um homem morto (A Dead Man)
3. A Bala (The Bullet)
4. O Grande César (The Great César)
5. Ayahuasca
6. Ka-Bum
7. César Está Vivo (César is Alive)
8. Paco tem que Morrer (Paco need to die)

=== Season 4 (2020) ===
1. Pax Romana
2. Todos os caminhos levam a Miami (Every path take to Miami)
3. Dinheiro é a lei (Money is the Law)
4. Família Nostra (Our Family)
5. Presente de Grego
6. Criador e Criatura (Criator and Criature)
7. Pagando o Preco
8. Libertade

== Awards and nominations ==
=== Golden Nymph Award ===
Year	Category	Nominated	Result	Ref.
2017	Best Long Program	Breno Silveira Thomas Stavros Gustavo Lipsztein	Nominated	

=== International Emmy Award ===
Year	Category	Nominated	Result	Ref.
2017	Best Performance by an Actor	Júlio Andrade	Nominated	
2018	Best Performance by an Actor	Júlio Andrade	Nominated	
2018	Best Dramatic Series	1 Contra Todos	Nominated	
2019	Best Dramatic Series	1 Contra Todos	Nominated	

=== Paulista Association of Art Critics ===
Year	Category	Nominated	Result	Ref.
2017	Best Performance by an Actor	Júlio Andrade	Won	
2017	Best Series	Breno Silveira Gustavo Lipsztein Thomas Stavros	Nominated	
2018	Best Performance by an Actor	Júlio Andrade	Pending	

=== Platino Awards ===
Year	Category	Nominated	Result	Ref.
2018	Best Male Performance in Miniseries or Teleserie	Júlio Andrade	Nominated	
2018	Best Miniseries or TV Series	Breno Silveira Gustavo Lipsztein Thomas Stavros	Nominated	
2018	Best Female Performance in a Miniseries or Teleserie	JULIA IANINA	Nominated	

=== Extra Television Award ===
Year	Category	Nominated	Result	Ref.
2018	Best Series	Breno Silveira Gustavo Lipsztein Thomas Stavros	Nominated	

=== 12 Awards Fiesp / Sesi-SP of Cinema and TV ===
Year	Category	Nominated	Result	Ref.
2018	Best TV Series for Open, Closed or OTT	Breno Silveira Gustavo Lipsztein Thomas Stavros	Nominated	
