= Gustavo Lipsztein =

Brazilian filmmaker

Gustavo Lipsztein is a television and film screenwriter, director, producer born in Rio de Janeiro. He created and co-wrote the Netflix miniseries Emergencia Radioativa (Radioactive Emergency) [2026], a true story centered on the 1987 radiological accident in Goiânia, Brazil. He also created, wrote and executive produced the Netflix miniseries Todo Dia a Mesma Noite (The Endless Night) [2023], wrote Amazon comedy feature Depois a Louca Sou Eu (Losing My Marbles) [2022], co-created and wrote Fox series 1 Contra Todos (One Against All) [2017-2020], wrote the feature O Paciente - O Caso Tancredo Neves (The Patient: The Last Hours of Tancredo Neves) [2018], wrote Polícia Federal: A Lei É para Todos (Operation Carwash: A Worldwide Corruption Scandal Made in Brazil) [2017], and created and wrote Brazilian broadcast series Sem Volta [2017]. Lipsztein also wrote Santo [2022] for Netflix Spain, wrote, directed and produced the Lionsgate feature film Dead in the Water, and co-directed the Spanish/Argentinean feature film Blue Lips.

Lipsztein earned a BA from NYU's Tisch School of Arts, a Masters in screenwriting from the American Film Institute, and an MBA from the UCLA Anderson School of Management. He currently resides in Los Angeles, CA.

== Awards & nominations ==
Depois a Louca Sou Eu won the Best Comedy Feature Film at the Grande Prêmio do Cinema Brasileiro in 2022.

1 Contra Todos was twice nominated for Best Drama Series at the International Emmy Awards in 2018 and 2019.

Lipsztein has personally received multiple nominations for his writing work on Depois a Louca Sou Eu, 1 Contra Todos and O Paciente - O Caso Tancredo Neves.

Year	Award	Category	Nominee(s)	Result	Ref.
2022	Grande Prêmio do Cinema Brasileiro	Best Comedy	Depois a Louca Sou Eu	Won	
2022	Prêmio ABRA de Roteiro	Best Comedy Screenplay	Gustavo Lipsztein for Depois a Louca Sou Eu		
2022	Prêmio Guarani de Cinema Brasileiro	Best Adapted Screenplay	Gustavo Lipsztein for Depois a Louca Sou Eu		
2019	International Emmy Awards	Best Drama Series	1 Contra Todos		
2019	Grande Prêmio do Cinema Brasileiro	Best Adapted Screenplay	Gustavo Lipsztein for O Paciente - O Caso Tancredo Neves		
2018	International Emmy Awards	Best Drama Series	1 Contra Todos		
2018	Prêmio ABRA de Roteiro	Best Screenplay	Gustavo Lipsztein for 1 Contra Todos		
2017	Prêmio ABRA de Roteiro	Best Screenplay	Gustavo Lipsztein for 1 Contra Todos		
2017	Monte-Carlo Television Festival	Best Long Fiction Program	Gustavo Lipsztein for 1 Contra Todos		
