= Polícia Federal: A Lei É para Todos =

2017 film directed by Marcelo Antunez

- Directed by: Marcelo Antunez
- Written by: Thomas Stavros; Gustavo Lipsztein
- Produced by: Tomislav Blazic
- Starring: Antonio Calloni; Bruce Gomlevsky; Flávia Alessandra; Rainer Cadete; João Baldasserini
- Distributed by: Downtown Filmes
- Release date: 7 September 2017 (Brazil)
- Running time: 107
- Country: Brazil
- Language: Portuguese
- Budget: R$ 16 million
- Box office: R$ 19 million

Polícia Federal: A Lei É para Todos (English: Federal Police: The Law Is for Everyone) is a Brazilian thriller movie of 2017. It was directed by Marcelo Antunez, produced by Tomislav Blazic and scripted by Thomas Stavros and Gustavo Lipsztein. It was inspired by the book of the same name by Carlos Graieb and Ana Maria Santos. Starring Antônio Calloni, portrays Operation Car Wash from the point of view of the police investigators who acted in it. According to producer Tomislav Blazic, the plot will be divided into three films, which should be released each year, and the film is not a documentary and therefore, despite being based on the Lava Jato, has no obligation to be faithful to the reality.

Costing 16 million reais, the film did not have the sponsors revealed, and did not use public resources. The names of the investors, about 25, were kept confidential, according to Blazic, at the request of the entrepreneurs, who made the disbursements as individuals. "They asked, I have to respect. Many films were made like this in Brazil and abroad." The film featured a cooperation agreement signed between Blazic and the Federal Police in 2015. The film had its premiere on August 28 for guests in Curitiba, among them judges Sergio Moro, Marcelo Bretas and prosecutor Deltan Dallagnol, as well as delegates, police and justice officials, and premiered in Brazilian theaters at Independence Day holiday, September 7.

In the first week, it attracted 461,783 to the theaters, about 430,000 from Thursday to Sunday, and another 30,000 in the premieres, with revenues of 7.8 million reais, being the second most watched movie behind the US movie It. It had the best debut of the year among national films. As of September 25, the number of people who went to the cinema to watch the movie surpassed one million, and by the end of the first day of October became the most viewed national movie of 2017 until then.

== Production ==
Producer Tomislav Blazic was working on another film with the Federal Police on the arms and drug trafficking project when Operation Car Wash began to emerge. Seeing the size of what was happening to the country, he decided to stop this other project and get behind the scenes of Operation Car Wash so that society would be aware of the evil that corruption brings to everyone.

The film took a year and a half for research, screenplay and filming and was supported by the Brazilian Federal Police itself, which advised the production, gave interviews to the director and screenwriters, and authorized the filming of scenes at its headquarters in Curitiba and the Rio de Janeiro.

== Cast ==
- Antonio Calloni as Ivan
- Bruce Gomlevsky as Júlio Cesar
- Flávia Alessandra as Beatriz
- Rainer Cadete as ítalo Agneli
- João Baldasserini as Vinícius
- Ary Fontoura as Luiz Inácio Lula da Silva
- Marcelo Serrado as Sergio Moro
- Roberto Birindelli as Alberto Youssef
- Juliana Schalch as Rosângela Moro
- Eduardo Melo as Filipo Moro
- Samuel Toledo as Agent Edu
- Leonardo Medeiros as Marcelo Odebrecht
- Roney Facchini as Paulo Roberto Costa
- Sandra Coreveloni as Dona Marici
- Juliana Schalch as Reporter Juliana
- Genesio de Barros as Julio Cesar's father
- Adelio Lima as Dr. Antenor
- Tadeu Aguiar as Director Geral Rodrigo
- Cris Flores as Lilian
- João Lucas Romero as Walter
- Yaçana Martins as Julio Cesar's mother
- Alex Rechi as Julio Cesar's brother
- Beth Zalcman as Dona Mariza
- Bruno Giordiano as Moraes
- Sefora Rangel as Senator
- Joca Andreazza as Parliamentary
- Dani Antunez as Isabella Odebrecht
- Lumi Kin as Nelma Kodama
- Marcelo Panazi as Renato Duque
- Charles Myara as Pedro Barusco
- Paulo Tavares as Cerveró
- Geise Lima as Catta Preta
- Isadora Ceccato as Paulo Roberto Costa's daughter
- Angela Delphin as Paulo Roberto Costa's maid
- Alexandre Luzzi as Euvis
- Paulo Cesar as Old executive
- Angela Pataro as Old executive's wife
- Ricco Lima as Glasses's executive
- Antõnio Barboza as Thin executive
- Rocine Castelo as Bald executive
- Alexandre Massulo as fat executive
- Laura Haddad as Red jakcet's lawyer
- Sidy Correa as grey necktie's lawyer
- Fabio Bastos as IML's medic
- Marcelo Torreão as Maradona
- Reporters - superintendency of pf's (curitiba)
  - Adriano Gomes
  - Nicole Castoldi
  - Caio Torrado
- Julia Cartier Bresson as Global coast's reporter
- Reporters - Lula building
  - Daniel Chagas
  - Carol Picchi
- Gero Pestalozzi as Anchorman
- Mariana da Costa Pinto as Anchorwoman
- Reporters - Solaris condominium
  - Guilherme Gonzalez
  - Lu Baptista
  - Vivi Netto
- Aline Carrocino as Solaris condominium' maid
- Ole Erdmann as Swiss district attorney
- Maurício Fernandes as Lula's lawyer
- Jaedson Bahia as Lula's safety
- Osvaldo Fernandes as Presenter
- Rodrigo Leite as Reporter - conference room
- Daniel Moragas as delegate of the federal police of brasilia
- Ed Canedo as london agent
- Rafael Zolly as Brasilia's agent
- Marcelo Mello as RJ agent (Rico)
- Robson Santos as Agent A
- Fábio Nascimento as Rosangela Moro living room's agent
- Tian Drese as Coercive agent
- André Kirmayr as gpi agent
- Mário Toba as Federal's japanese
- Bia Barros as Ivan's daughter
- Sofia Barros as Vini's daughter
- Leticia Tomazela as Vini's wife

== Criticism and compliments ==
According to Humberto Trezzi of the newspaper Zero Hora, the film has some sins. On-screen prosecutors and federal police officers interact harmoniously, when their relationship is often seen as tense and antagonistic at the time of conducting award-winning allegations. The director chose to give real names to politicians and businessmen (Lula, former president of the republic, appears only through a grouchy and obnoxious representation), but gave the police officers pseudonyms. The critic questions this artistic decision of different treatment. Even to circumvent the accusation of Manichaeism, some character delegates say that they voted for the PT and debated the Car Wash (as has happened, in fact, in any Brazilian family). If the film charges against petistas at this first moment, the sequels should attack the "tucanos" (supporters of PSDB) and the "peemedebistas" (supporters of PMDB).

According to Katia Kreutz of the Cinemascope website, "Ruy Barbosa's phrase, which opens the film, could also be used for its conclusion. 'From seeing the triumph of nullities triumphing, from seeing dishonor thrive, from seeing injustice grow, from seeing the powers rise in the hands of the wicked, man discourages virtue, laughs at honor, to be ashamed to be honest.' When the lights come on, some of the audience may even laugh, some already expecting the continuations of this story - which promises to be long… Others will simply get up from their seats ashamed to live in a country where they live. law is not yet in fact for everyone."

According to Artur Xexéo of the newspaper O Globo, "'Polícia Federal' is a good guy and bad guy movie that starts from the premise that the good guy is the Federal Police and the bad guy, the Workers Party. If this bothers you, do not go near the door of the movie theaters where it is playing. If you accept this role distribution, if only for expecting from the movie just a piece of fiction, then go without fright. 'Federal Police' is quite a thriller and has worked as a catharsis for viewers who seem outraged by recent news."

== See also ==
- Erika Marena
- Federal Police of Brazil
- Operation Car Wash
- Thomas Stavros
