= Sob Pressão =

Brazilian medical drama television series

- Genre: Medical drama
- Created by: Luiz Noronha; Cláudio Torres; Renato Fagundes; Jorge Furtado
- Based on: Sob Pressão by Andrucha Waddington; Sob Pressão: A Rotina de Guerra de Um Médico Brasileiro by Márcio Maranhão
- Written by: Jorge Furtado; Lucas Paraizo; Antonio Prata; Márcio Alemão; André Sirangelo; Flávio Araújo; Cláudia Jouvin; Pedro Riguetti
- Directed by: Andrucha Waddington; Mini Kerti; Rebeca Diniz; Pedro Waddington; Júlio Andrade
- Starring: Júlio Andrade; Marjorie Estiano; Stepan Nercessian; Bruno Garcia; Tatsu Carvalho; Pablo Sanábio; Orã Figueiredo; Heloísa Jorge; Josie Antello; Alexandre David; Talita Castro; Fernanda Torres; Humberto Carrão; Julia Shimura; Drica Moraes; Marcelo Batista; Jana Guinond; David Junior; Roberta Rodrigues; Bárbara Reis
- Country of origin: Brazil
- Original language: Portuguese
- No. of seasons: 5
- No. of episodes: 59

Production
- Producers: Gustavo Baldoni; Andrucha Waddington; Maria Amélia Teixeira; Renata Brandão
- Production location: Rio de Janeiro
- Camera setup: Single-camera
- Running time: 34–77 minutes
- Production companies: Conspiração Filmes; Estúdios Globo

Original release
- Network: TV Globo
- Release: 25 July 2017 – 7 July 2022

Sob Pressão (English: Under Pressure) is a Brazilian medical drama television series created by Luiz Noronha, Cláudio Torres, Renato Fagundes and Jorge Furtado based on the 2016 film of the same name (which was inspired by the Márcio Maranhão book Sob Pressão: A Rotina de Guerra de Um Médico Brasileiro). The series is a co-production of Conspiração Filmes and TV Globo, and premiered on 25 July 2017, on TV Globo.

The series follows the emergency department doctors and nurses of a precarious public hospital in Rio de Janeiro. Júlio Andrade (Dr. Evandro), Marjorie Estiano (Dr. Carolina) and Stepan Nercessian (Samuel) all reprised their movie roles for the television series.

Production for the first season started at the beginning of March 2017. Filming began 10 April 2017. TV Globo renewed the show for a second season in May 2017, before the first one even started airing. The second season premiered on 9 October 2018.

In May 2018, the series was renewed for a third season.

== Plot ==
Inside a chaotic emergency room in Rio de Janeiro, a team of doctors are torn between their internal personal conflicts, the difficulties of the profession and the surprising dramas behind each patient's history, in a heroic attempt to save lives. A talented surgeon and a faith-driven doctor will find strength in each other to face this extremely harsh routine.

== Cast ==
=== Main ===
- Júlio Andrade as Dr. Evandro Moreira, a skeptical chief surgeon of the medical staff of a public hospital seeking healing for his sick soul
- Marjorie Estiano as Dr. Carolina Almeida, a religious vascular surgeon who seeks in faith the antidote against all the misery she faces in her daily life
- Bruno Garcia as Dr. Décio Guedes, a general practitioner
- Stepan Nercessian as Dr. Samuel Fagundes, the hospital's director (seasons 1–2; guest Covid)
- Pablo Sanábio as Dr. Charles Garcia, a resident
- Tatsu Carvalho as Dr. Rafael Albertini, a neurosurgeon (seasons 1–2)
- Orã Figueiredo as Dr. Amir Salgado, an anesthetist (seasons 1–2)
- Heloísa Jorge as Jaqueline Vaz, a nurse (seasons 1–2)
- Josie Antello as Rosa, the hospital's receptionist
- Alexandre David as Adalberto Santos, the hospital's watchman (seasons 1–2)
- Talita Castro as Kelly Cristina Ribeiro, a nursing technique (season 1)
- Fernanda Torres as Dr. Renata Veiga, a private consultant later nominated as hospital manager (season 2)
- Humberto Carrão as Dr. Henrique Figueira (season 2)
- Julia Shimura as Keiko Yamada, a nurse (season 2–present)
- Drica Moraes as Dr. Vera Lúcia Veiga, an infectologist (season 3–present)
- Marcelo Batista as Dr. Gustavo Lemos, an anesthetist (season 3, 4–present)
- Jana Guinond as Simone Ramos, a nurse (season 3)
- David Junior as Dr. Mauro, a neurosurgeon (Covid–present)
- Roberta Rodrigues as Marisa, a nurse (Covid)
- Bárbara Reis as Lívia, a nurse (season 4–present)

=== Recurring ===
- Cridemar Aquino as Paulo, a paramedic
- Luís Melo as José Luiz Almeida, Carolina's father (seasons 1–2)
- Ângela Rabelo as Dercília (seasons 1–2)
- Natália Lage as Madalena Moreira, Evandro's deceased wife (season 1)
- Marcelo Serrado as Roberto, a state government official working at the Secretary of Health (season 2)
- Joana Fomm as Mother Superior Graça (season 3)
- Ana Flávia Cavalcanti as Diana, a drug addict, and later Evandro's affair (season 3–present)

== Episodes ==
Series	Episodes	Originally released		
Series	Episodes	First released	Last released	Network
1	9	25 July 2017	19 September 2017	TV Globo
2	11	9 October 2018	18 December 2018	TV Globo
3	14	2 May 2019	25 July 2019	TV Globo
Covid	2	6 October 2020	13 October 2020	TV Globo
4	11	12 August 2021	21 October 2021	TV Globo
5	12	2 June 2022	7 July 2022	Globoplay

=== Season 1 (2017) ===
No. overall	No. in season	Title	Directed by	Written by	Original release date	Brazil viewers (in points)
1	1	"Episode 1"	Andrucha Waddington & Mini Kerti	Jorge Furtado, Lucas Paraizo, Antonio Prata & Márcio Alemão	25 July 2017	28.2
One year prior to the main events of the series, Dr. Evandro is seen about to perform surgery on his own severely wounded wife, Madalena, against the advice of his medical team. The surgery proves ineffective and she dies. Back to the present, Evandro performs surgery on a pregnant woman hit by a car and attempts to treat both her and her baby improvising medical instruments to compensate the lack of adequate tools. Later, electricity goes down and her recovery is compromised, but the doctors manage to hold their own manually and with blood donations. Meanwhile, Carolina makes a boy swallow the gum that was supposedly asphyxiating him. Later, she learns the boy's older brother, who brought him to the hospital, sells drugs, and suspects the boy was actually chocking on cocaine. She also looks after an old samba singer struggling with throat cancer and disappointed with the possibility of having to live his remaining years without cachaça. He succumbs to his disease during surgery.
2	2	"Episode 2"	Andrucha Waddington & Mini Kerti	Antonio Prata	1 August 2017	25.7
Evandro's team operate a tumor inside a radio presenter's brain that may affect her voice. The first surgery proves a partial success and a second one is required, but she is reluctant since her voice is her work instrument and despite the doctors warning her of the risks. A man named Valter (Paulo Miklos) arrives with his passed out teenage daughter, Michele and claims she took many tranquilizers. Carolina saves her but notices bruises on her arm. Later, Valter demands to see his daughter and storms in the intensive care unit. Michele is horrified by her father’s approaching and defenestrates, worsening her condition. Carolina talks to her and finally learns Valter abuses her. A corpus delicti examination is performed and the father is taken away by the police. Samuel asks Evandro to sign a document giving thumbs up to the acquisition of a tomograph that is worth half its informed price. He notices it's an over-invoicing scheme and refuses to sign the papers. Samuel convinces a reluctant Evandro to sign them. Evandro and Carolina have sex and discuss Evandro's wife's death and Carolina's past – she reveals she has been cutting herself after constant abuses from her father.
3	3	"Episode 3"	Andrucha Waddington & Mini Kerti	Lucas Paraizo	8 August 2017	26.7
A young man arrives following a serious road accident and the team manages to reactivate his heart, but he ends up brain dead. Evandro urges his mother Bete (Laila Garin) to allow his organs to be donated before they stop working, but she refuses to recognize his death. Carolina checks his wallet and finds a document in which he declares himself as an organ donator. Upon seeing the document, Bete finally agrees to authorize the transplants. An unnamed, foreign passed out woman, Keisha, hailing from Benin. Charles finds a picture of her with a man and a pamphlet of a pizzeria in her pocket. He heads there and finds out a whorehouse operates nextdoor. He arranges a private room with another girl and learns they are victims of sex trafficking. Charles manages to have a diplomat from the Benin consulate come to the hospital to assist Keisha and have her testify to the police so the gang can be arrested.
4	4	"Episode 4"	Andrucha Waddington & Mini Kerti	Jorge Furtado	15 August 2017	28.5
Evandro treats some wounds on a woman called Talita and believes she has been physically assaulted by her partner, though she states she simply fell down some stairs. Carolina pressures Evandro to denounce the husband to the authorities, but the doctor does not wish to go against the victim's will. On the next day, Francisco arrives with a knife wound on his chest claiming it was Talita. Carolina tells him she regrets the knife missed his heart and says she will have him arrested. Later, Francisco tells a police officer he was assaulted by two thieves, but Talita arrives and finally reveals that she attacked him on self-defense from his aggressions. A blind man called Romero arrives with his guide dog Astro after both were hit by a car. The team takes the man inside, but the dog is left outside and alone. Later, Evandro and Amir perform surgery on the animal, which recovers and leaves with his owner. Later, Astro comes running back to the hospital and Evandro has it take him to a passed out Romero, who is rushed back to the hospital and saved again. However, Samuel reprehends Evandro for treating an animal in front of the hospital. Madalena's mother informs Samuel she intends to sue Evandro following his failed (and anti-ethical) attempt to save her. Amir, who is revealed to be dating two women who don't know about each other, barely escapes a situation in which both his girlfriends came to the hospital simultaneously. Carolina and Evandro have sex in his apartment, but she finds out about the pictures he's been secretly taking of her and angrily leaves.
5	5	"Episode 5"	Andrucha Waddington & Mini Kerti	Márcio Alemão	22 August 2017	28.4
A woman called Apolônia (Zezé Motta) arrives complaining of a possible mosquito bite. The doctors investigate and are surprised to find out she is actually carrying a stray bullet in her heart. Following a delicate surgery, they manage to safely remove it from her. Later, she intends to take the 382 steps of the stairway leading up to the Our Lady of Peñafrancia Church and place the bullet at the foot of the saint's image, despite the doctors recommending her not to make such an effort so soon. Evandro approaches her as she walks up the stairs and tells her of a dream he had in which she asked him to place the bullet there. She ends up letting him do it. A man called Maicon (Rafael Losso) brings his wife to the hospital as she undergoes labor. He tells Evandro he suspects he got the HIV virus from a previous relationship and that he may have passed it to his wife (who is unaware of his condition) and, consequently, to his son. Evandro examines him and the suspicion comes true. Maicon reveals his condition to his wife and she angrily tells him to leave. The doctors run some examinations on both the woman and the child and find out they are HIV free. The woman ultimately forgives Maicon. Carolina avoids contact with Evandro following their argument in the end of the previous episode. She treats Teo (Pedro Lamin), a victim of a car accident who wasn't wearing his seatbelt, and spots some bruises on him similar to the ones she caused herself. After he recovers, they have dinner together. Later, Carolina starts talking to Evandro again. Amir narrowly escapes another situation in which both his girlfriends are on the hospital at the same time.
6	6	"Episode 6"	Andrucha Waddington & Mini Kerti	Márcio Alemão	29 August 2017	28.8
A van crashes and all injured passengers are brought to the hospital, prompting Evandro to summon his entire team to handle all the victims. Carolina, however, is with Teo and ignores all phone calls. As they have sex, he tries to strangle her and she stabs him in self-defense. Then, she brings him to the hospital and secretly treats him in the dressing room. As she leaves the room, Teo sends her footage of them having sex and demands to see her again on the next day or he'll leak it. Among the victims of the van accident is a mature married man who keeps a secret relationship with a younger man and decides to reveal his affair to his wife, who doesn't understand it and angrily leaves. Another victim is an elderly man who swallowed some jewelry. When questioned about this, he reveals he stole them after being fired from a jewelry store in which he worked for decades just before his retirement in order to pay for his wife's medical care. Evandro and Rafael examine the van's driver, who apparently collapsed at the wheel. Meanwhile, a man angrily insults him in the corridor and not even the driver's wife presence stops him from suggesting he was driving under influence. Evandro and Rafael discover the driver had a heart problem that caused his brain to receive no blood, leading him to the collapse. They also discover the man died after being lynched and reveal it to everyone in the hospital. Eventually, the angry man apologizes for his behavior. A man tries to leave his father-in-law in the hospital for treatment, but Evandro believes he is just trying to get rid of the old man to enjoy the weekend and rejects the patient. The man obtains a warrant demanding Evandro to operate on his father-in-law, but the doctor refuses in order to give full attention to the more urgent victims. Later, he is arrested for disobeying the warrant and offers no resistance out of clean consciousness of his choice. Due to his arrest, he misses the first audience of the case regarding the death of his wife.
7	7	"Episode 7"	Andrucha Waddington & Mini Kerti	Antonio Prata	5 September 2017	26
A carpenter arrives after sawing his thumb off, but asks the team not to reimplant it because he is actually attempting to earn insurance money in order to pay his debts to some loan sharks. Evandro promises him he will be safe in the hospital and indeed foils an attempt on the carpenter's life with the help of the hospital guard. Teo breaks in Carolina's apartment and blackmails her into getting there to see him. Once there, she leaks the footage herself in order to end his control over her. After the images go viral, Samuel suggests she takes some time off until the fuss is over. As she goes home, her father (Luís Melo), who has always been an atheist, reappears after a long time and invites her to the Pentecostal church he founded. Ivaldo, the old man who piratically lives at the hospital, is sent to surgery after a dangerous tumor is found in his axilla. His estranged wife comes to see him and the two reconnect after he survives the surgery, finally allowing him to leave the hospital. Evandro attends the rescheduled hearing session of his case and is confronted with a medical prescription with an abortifacient he supposedly prescribed for Madalena not long before her death, which he doesn't recognize in spite of his signature. Later, Rafael reacts strangely to Samuel's accounts of Evandro's audience and ends up admitting he and Madalena had an affair and that she was pregnant of him, revealing the reason she was seeking an abortion. Amir makes a reservation in a restaurant to have lunch with one of his girlfriends but accidentally invites the other girlfriend to the same place and time. The two meet and find out about Amir's lies before he arrives, but both decide to pretend everything is normal in order to take advantage of him.
8	8	"Episode 8"	Andrucha Waddington & Mini Kerti	Lucas Paraizo	13 September 2017	27.5
The team is unable to save a girl wounded by a stray bullet and the father charges towards a pillar out of insanity after hearing the news, hitting it head first and fainting. When he wakes up, he has no memory of his daughter's death and his wife is reluctant about telling him the truth. When he recovers and is about to leave the hospital, Evandro decides to tell him the truth and he cries. A bride arrives with an open fracture following a car crash on the way to the church. She asks her fiancée to marry her right there in the hospital before anything worse happens and a reluctant Décio arranges for a justice of the peace to go there and officially marry the couple. In another audience regarding Madalena's death, examinations on her remains and video footage of a drugstore reveal she indeed took abortifacients and was pregnant, unbeknownst to both Evandro and his ex-mother-in-law. After the audience, Rafael reveals the truth to Evandro, who responds by punching him in the face. Still suspended from the hospital, Carolina holds a voluntary medical check-up event at her father's church, assisted by Kelly. She notices a bruise in one of the church's employees, Roberta. Later, she witnesses her father abusing the woman and decides to expose him to everyone in the church during a cult.
9	9	"Episode 9"	Andrucha Waddington & Mini Kerti	Jorge Furtado, Lucas Paraizo, Antonio Prata & Márcio Alemão	19 September 2017	27.3
The hospital is operating at its limit and Evandro tells everyone to return another day for his team will only be able to treat life-threatening cases. They barely save one patient as they run out of oxygen, but after several requests, it is finally delivered to the hospital. Carolina notices the hospital paid five times more for every m³ of oxygen and suspects of over-invoicing, but Samuel reminds her it's either that or they'll start losing patients. Later, at the court room, Evandro is close to having his medical license suspended, but Rafael finally speaks and reveals Madalena suspected the child was his and therefore took the abortifacients which most likely caused her death. Following the audience, Evandro and Madalena's mother share a tearful hug. Amir's girlfriends give him date rape drugs and then film him as he wakes up trapped in an attic without a roof in which he stays for hours and develops burns as a consequence. They also leak the video on the internet. Kelly treats him and they make out. Carolina's father tells her that her mother always knew about his abuses but neither she nor her family did a thing about it because they depended on his money. He also asks her to drop the charges on him, but she refuses and leaves. Back home, she slits her wrists while Evandro buys food at a supermarket and helps a customer with epilepsy. Later, Evandro rescues Carolina and takes her to the hospital, where he performs surgery on her and almost loses her just like he lost Madalena. The father of the man Evandro helped in the supermarket pays him a visit at the hospital and offers him a position at his luxurious hospital, which Evandro accepts. In his new job, Evandro is uncomfortable with the advanced machines facilitating his work. One day, a train accident leaves many people injured and prompts Carolina to call Evandro for additional support. He cancels his appointments for the rest of the day and heads to the hospital.

=== Season 2 (2018) ===
No. overall	No. in season	Title	Directed by	Written by	Original release date	Brazil viewers (in points)
10	1	"Episode 1"	Andrucha Waddington	Lucas Paraizo	9 October 2018	22.5
Evandro is kidnapped by some thugs in order to treat their wounded friend at a local slum. Unable to properly do his job in a poor environment, he convinces the criminals to call his team and have another doctor there to help him. Carolina steals a brand new ambulance (provided by a state congressman in exchange for having the hospital give priority for people sent by him) and goes to the slum collect the thug. Before they leave, however, the criminal dies. Fearing for his life and Carolina's, Evandro asks the criminals to take him to the hospital as he injects adrenaline into the thug's heart and pressures it with his hand to buy time and trick the gang into believing he can still be saved. The ambulance, however, is stopped by the police and Evandro is unable to keep his plan. The criminal's right hand reveals they are actually boyfriends and threatens to kill both doctors for his lover's death. Carolina manages to talk him out of it, but he ends up taking his own life. Meanwhile, the team struggles to treat Geisy, a woman about to go into labor. After her child is born, she abandons him and goes missing. Décio tries to take the child for adoption but ends up adopting him himself. Rafael and Charles treat a blind man who is suffering from severe headaches. An examination reveals that both his blindness and his pain could be cured with a simple surgery. His girlfriend Jade, however, is upset because they first met on the internet and she sent him fake pictures of her just before he went blind and met her in person. However, as he recovers his sight, he refuses to let her go.
11	2	"Episode 2"	Andrucha Waddington	Márcio Alemão	16 October 2018	23.3
Evandro and Carolina get married in a non-religious ceremony. Soon after, they hurry to an apartment where they treat an obese man suffering a heart attack. Due to his size, a crane must be rushed to the neighborhood in order to bring him down to the street and then to the ambulance. At the hospital, he gets worse. Due to his condition, his daughter is forced to cancel her wedding, much to her fiancé frustration. Later, Evandro finds out he has been taking weight loss medication without medical prescription, which ultimately led him to his state. He suggests he takes a bariatric surgery, but he will have to wait too long in the public health system and his daughter is getting married within the month. Evandro then asks his team to help him perform the surgery himself right away so the father has time to recover and attend the wedding. After eating a peace of cake, Samuel passes out. Evandro examines him and reveals he is suffering from diabetes and needs to take care of himself. Décio reveals to Jaqueline that he refused to take the child to adoption and still wants to return it to his mother and asks her to take care of the child for the day. Adalberto, the hospital guard, helps him by tracking the woman and he takes the child back to her, but gives up as soon as he realizes she lives in an abandoned mansion full of drug addicts. The team is introduced to a new member: orthopedist Henrique (Humberto Carrão), who is only used to private medical centers. His first patient is a biker with multiple fractures following a hit-and-run. Henrique becomes increasingly surprised by the lack of infrastructure in the hospital. When the biker's condition worsens, the team is unable to locate Henrique and perform another surgery, but he dies. Henrique later says he was at a local mall having a meal. Meanwhile, a couple arrives at the hospital willing to check on the biker; they are actually the ones who hit him and fled, but are posing as people who first assisted the biker. When his mother arrives and is informed of his death, the couple finally admit their involvement and are consequently taken to the precinct.
12	3	"Episode 3"	Mini Kerti	André Sirangelo	23 October 2018	N/A
Evandro and Carolina take a long-overdue weekend off, but on their way out of the city, Charles calls him and asks for instructions to treat a man with tuberculosis. Evandro decides to return to the hospital just to check on the patient and the two end up resuming their activities like just another day at work. Later, the patient gets worse and Evandro performs a risky surgery that ends up successful. A couple arrive following a car accident; the woman is unconscious and the man is too agitated. After being treated, he is shown taking cocaine in the toilet and learns soon after that his fiancée is now in a coma. Later, she dies. The man overdoses and is consequently treated at the hospital. As police conduct a major operation on a nearby slum, a police officer is brought to the hospital, shot in the chest. The team manages to save him, but he is still unstable. His father, a retired police colonel, pays him a visit and says he never wanted him to be an officer like him. As he awaits his son recovery, he suffers a sudden heart attack and dies. His son comments to Evandro that he will not leave the police, mentioning there's no other place he can carry on with his war on crime. The mother whose child is being taken care by Décio goes to the hospital to reclaim her son, but Décio refuses it. He also tries to help her fight her addiction, even though the hospital has no infrastructure for it and ties her to a bed as she fights her drug withdrawal. Later, her former partner comes to collect her and her baby and offers her some drugs to convince her. Décio asks her what she truly wants and she rejects the drugs as the man is taken away by Adalberto. Evandro sees Henrique leaving the hospital mid-shift and questions hem; Henrique says he forgot something at home but Evandro insinuates he is going for his shift at a private hospital.
13	4	"Episode 4"	Andrucha Waddington	Antonio Prata	30 October 2018	N/A
Carolina's father leaves prison on parole and goes to the hospital to visit her, much to her disgust. He tries to reconnect with her multiple times but keeps getting turned down. Carolina grows increasingly scared and almost cuts herself again. Eventually, Evandro kicks him out of the hospital. Soon after, he is surrounded by three thugs who beat him up, for which he soon returns to the hospital where he undergoes surgery, with Evandro preventing Carolina from taking part of it. However, she enters the room anyway and attempts to help, but the father dies. Later, she asks Evandro if he really did everything he could to save her father despite hating him, which he confirms. Following a tradition set by Evandro, Carolina tries to mark her father's death at the door frame (a procedure taken by Evandro every time a patient dies), but suffers a nervous breakdown and cries. A thug arrives at the hospital following a confrontation with the police. Some cops arrive to bring him in, but the medical team say they'll only release him when they're done. Evandro is insecure about Carolina's mental condition following the unexpected rendezvous with her father, but she insists she performs surgery. After the thug wakes up, he says he overheard her conversation and insinuates he is willing to help her "deal" with her father in return for saving his life and not handing him over to the police. After the father takes the beating, Carolina confronts the thug and reprehends him for ordering his men to do that. Décio and Jaqueline treat Jamile, a transsexual woman formerly named Anderson, whose illegally placed breast prosthesis suffers a rip. She also says she is undergoing unsupervised hormonal treatment and that she left home at the age of 13, fearing her parents' reaction to her sexuality. Jaqueline advises Décio to talk to the girl using his own experience as a gay man hiding his sexuality from his mother. She eventually gives in and asks him to call her parents so they can authorize her adequate hormonal treatment, since she's still a minor. When her parents arrive, they are shocked to see her transformation. The father rejects her outright, but her mother accepts her daughter's sexuality and agrees to sign the authorization if it's for the sake of her daughter's happiness. The state Secretary of Health sends Roberto (Marcelo Serrado), one of their employees, and Renata (Fernanda Torres), a private consultant, to check on the hospital's situation. Renata insinuates the hospital could benefit more from better management than from a mere sum increase, but after she takes a tour around the facilities, she admits the place need more money urgently. Later, Roberto tells Samuel the secretary of health is willing to send some emergency funds to the hospital, but wants to have Renata replace him as the hospital manager.
14	5	"Episode 5"	Andrucha Waddington	André Sirangelo	6 November 2018	N/A
Carolina takes a bus to the hospital and the vehicle is raided by a thief. A minor conflict arises between the criminal and the driver and the bus falls off a bridge. Evandro and Charles are sent to the accident site and treat the injured, aided by Carolina and Diego (a Medicine student who Carolina befriended during their ride), who only suffered minor injuries. The criminal himself is the last person to be rescued, just before the bus explodes due to a gas leak. At the hospital, Renata introduces new measures such as biometric-controlled doors for the medicine room. She also orders Samuel to expel street food vendor Barão from the hospital area since his presence is against the state's sanitation rules. The meals at the hospital will now be served by an outsourced company. However, Rafael and three patients feel sick after eating the new food and Samuel soon finds out the company has been delivering food with fake expiration dates. Renata confronts Roberto, who reveals they have a scheme in which she gets paid a real for every meal sold. Renata complains that she needs proper infrastructure to work and he promises to provide better equipment for the hospital. He also says she will have to stay there for some time before being nominated for higher positions in the government. A woman tells Evandro she's been feeling strange and that an Internet research revealed she might be really bad. Evandro coldly sends her back home telling her there's nothing to be afraid of. Later, she arrives dead at the hospital. Consumed by guilt, Evandro enters the medicines room and take some pills, resurrecting his addiction.
15	6	"Episode 6"	Mini Kerti	Márcio Alemão	13 November 2018	N/A
Evandro sends Leda, an elder woman with inflammation in her gallbladder, to surgery, though she would rather postpone it due to her wedding, scheduled for that day. However, after Renata invites him to join her in a medical fair where she intends to get good equipment for the hospital, he puts Charles in charge of the patient, though he never performed such surgery before. The surgery goes well, but it reveals a pericardial effusion, making Charles even more upset about dealing with it without Evandro's help. Meanwhile, Evandro is disgusted with all the politics and fortunes involved at the event, but ends up signing contracts to buy brand new equipment from Sérgio Vieira, a major businessman in the area with whom Roberto is trying to build corrupt schemes that will benefit Renata too. On his way back to the hospital, Evandro is stuck in traffic and has to instruct Charles via a videocall, but his battery dies at a critical moment. Charles manages to work it out, however, and saves Leda, becoming extremely happy with his performance. An agitated father brings his unconscious son Johnathan to the hospital, saying he had an accident at his school's playground. After some examinations, the team finds it odd that the kid has so many injuries following a simple fall. After the surgery, the father approaches his son and Johnathan becomes a bit agitated. Later, Samuel reveals the school has checked their CCTV and the boy had never been at the playground that day. Carolina deduces the father has been beating the child and prevents him from talking to Johnathan, publicly accusing him of the aggressions at one point. Later, she learns the boy actually fell from a tree after trying to film the girls' toilet, colliding with multiple branches on his way down, and he was just afraid of his father reaction, since he is a constant troublemaker at school. Carolina apologizes to the father, but he is still too angry and says she is crazy, that she shouldn't be a doctor and that he intends to sue her. Later at home, Carolina attempts to cut herself again, but Evandro arrives in time to stop her.
16	7	"Episode 7"	Mini Kerti	Antonio Prata	20 November 2018	N/A
A family prepares a barbecue at their balcony and the daughter falls off of it after trying to collect a kite tangled in some nearby power cables. As the team performs surgery on her, a blood transfusion proves needed but the family is against it for religious reasons. Evandro berates them for putting a religious belief before a child's life and asks Renata to seek legal assistance. Not only does she fail but the family has a lawyer go to the hospital threaten them legally in case they carry on with the transfusion. Evandro in turn is willing to deliberately ignore the family's wish. After an argument, the girl's mother gives thumbs up for the transfusion. As the girl receives the blood, her father goes to his church to pray. At first reluctant about coming back to his family, he ends up reuniting with them just after the daughter reawakens. Jaqueline and Charles treat a homeless, speechless man who arrived at the hospital after being brutally assaulted by security guards at a local mall. Eventually, he leaves his bed when nobody's watching and makes a drawing of the family at the wall of an abandoned area of the hospital. Later, Charles and Jaqueline are able to locate the homeless man's brother, Pedro, who reveals he is Elton, an artist suffering from severe schizophrenia. Pedro then takes him back to his life. Renata acquires state-of-the-art equipment and items for the hospital, but the team find them too expensive. Henrique tells her he is aware that Renata is probably earning commission for buying such items. She then decides to add him to the scheme as a form of convincing him to dedicate more time to the hospital, as he is currently working at four other places as well. Evandro drugs himself with more medicines and suffers an attack, but Samuel aids him. Carolina meets him the next day, asleep at the hospital and with a bottle of medicines in his hand. She questions him later and says she is willing to help him fight his addiction.
17	8	"Episode 8"	Andrucha Waddington	Lucas Paraizo	27 November 2018	N/A
A woman is about to make out with her lover, a married man, when the building in which they are collapses. Evandro, who had just arrived home after his shift, rushes back to the hospital with Carolina to help the team, against her advice for him not to work so much without rest. At the hospital, he asks Renata to liberate some recently acquired equipment but she is reluctant because they haven’t been inspected yet. She ends up accepting only if Evandro himself signs the documents taking responsibility for using non-inspected material. Among the collapse victims is Maria Inês, a 14-year old girl who finds out she's pregnant during examinations. Her boyfriend Edinaldo pays her a visit and asks her mother to marry her. Later, Maria Inês starts feeling contractions and gives birth prematurely, but both she and the baby survive and are safe. Other victims include Gelson and Leila, the couple seen earlier in the episode. As soon as Gelson's wife Geisy finds out about the affair, she sets fire to his genitalia. Gelson is quickly saved and Geisy is taken to the precinct. Mariano, Leila's husband, forgives her for the affair, but it is soon found out that he was illegally reforming his apartment, which turned out to be the cause for the collapse, and he is taken by the law, as well. Another victim is Therezinha, an 80-year old lady who suffers a severe head injury and starts looking for her "little boy" after being treated. The team initially think she’s just confused due to the injury, but later a dog shows up at the hospital and they realize it is the real "little boy". Samuel pressures Braga, an acquaintance working in the health industry, to reveal information about Renata's schemes and later goes confront her about it. She says she is indeed getting 10% from every equipment sold to the hospital and that she doesn't consider it wrong because her official salary is too low and the hospital is finally getting the technology it needs. After he leaves her room, he picks up his phone and pauses a recorder he had secretly turned on before talking to her.
18	9	"Episode 9"	Andrucha Waddington	Antonio Prata	4 December 2018	N/A
Renata fires Samuel, who responds by showing her the audio he recorded in the previous episode and threatening to go public with it. Renata counter-threatens him with requests for over-invoiced new equipment signed by Evandro. She consults Roberto about it and he instructs her to "stop" him however she can. Later, they have another talk and Samuel suffers a hyperglycemia attack. Renata deliberately refrains from applying him some insulin and takes a while to call medical help. The team manages to save him, but Renata secretly switches his sodium bicarbonate with potassium chloride and leaves the hospital with the computer containing the CCTV files. Soon after, Carolina inadvertently applies the sabotaged medication to him, causing him to die. Evandro notices the medication's sabotaging, but thinks it was just Carolina's mistake, despite her protests. Frustrated with his lack of trust in her, Carolina places their wedding ring in his hands (imitating a gesture involving a couple she had witnessed earlier in the episode) and leaves Evandro.
19	10	"Episode 10"	Mini Kerti	André Sirangelo	11 December 2018	N/A
Renata tells Carolina Samuel's daughter is willing to take his death to the local ethics committee unless Carolina is transferred to another hospital, but Carolina insists she is innocent and refuses. Renata then asks Henrique to convince Carolina to accept the transference. Henrique initially refuses and proposes she allows an investigation, but she threatens him by insinuating an investigation would reveal his part in schemes. Carolina investigates the logs of the medication room and finds out Renata was there just before Samuel died. She confronts her about it but Renata comes up with convincing excuses. Carolina confirms she will not accept a transfer. Laís, a girl suffering from severe caught, is examined by the team, but the images' resolution is too poor for a safe diagnosis. Carolina suggests she is transferred to make sure Laís is not seriously ill, but Décio thinks she can be treated at the hospital. Due to Carolina's supposed mistake with Samuel's medications, nobody trusts her analysis and prefer to do as Décio says. Furthermore, Renata tells Laís' mother about Carolina's conduct and the mother requests that her daughter is treated by another doctor. After Laís' condition worsens, confirming Carolina's diagnosis, Evandro is too agitated due to his drug withdrawal and believes Carolina won't be able to save the child without his assistance. In the end, the girl is saved and the mother apologizes to Carolina for not trusting her. Ivone, the mother of street food vendor Barão (who was expelled from the hospital in Episode 5) is found passed out with an empty antipanic card by her side and subsequently brought to the hospital. Barão proposes she moves in to live with him and his wife. Later, instructed by Evandro, he brings back his food car to the hospital, but parks it just outside of the hospital jurisdiction so Renata cannot force him out again. After overhearing Barão and his wife arguing about her moving to their house, Ivone attempts a second suicide by secretly cutting the wires keeping her alive, but the team saves her again. Barão invites her to participate in his business by preparing some of the food he'll be selling on the street. At home, Carolina disposes of all her cutting objects. Meanwhile, Evandro smokes and cries looking at a picture of Samuel.
20	11	"Episode 11"	Andrucha Waddington & Mini Kerti	Márcio Alemão & Antonio Prata	18 December 2018	N/A
Décio takes Evandro to a mutual aid group for drug addicts, but he feels uncomfortable and unconvinced about the meeting's effectiveness and leaves. Décio later insists he carries on with his treatment. When a drunk young man is brought to the hospital and his mother expresses frustration with his constant drinking issues, Evandro suggests she takes him to rehab. A man is brought to the hospital after a backhoe loader accident and has to be put into surgery to treat his leg. His wife arrives at the hospital and says she does routine hemodialysis and is not able to work, so it's up to him to make ends meet. Mid-surgery, the team runs out of basic equipment and have to amputate his leg to save his live. Henrique is particularly frustrated with the outcome and has an argument with Renata, who blames Carolina for the incident, believing that, as the one in charge of the surgery, she should have checked the equipment prior to the procedures. Henrique pays Carolina a visit to reveal everything he knows about Renata's schemes and to confess his own involvement, as Evandro records it with his cellphone. On the following day, he is arrested and Evandro is taken too, due to him inadvertently having signed the purchase of over-invoiced material. The team discusses the situation and things get worse when a skywalk collapses and all the victims are brought to the hospital. Frustrated with the hospital's condition, the wife of one of the victims decides to buy equipment herself so her husband and other victims are properly treated. Carolina visits Samue'’s apartment with his daughter in search for evidence against Renata and later does the same at the hospital. Décio finds her there and mentions Samuel would always send reminders to his own answering machine. Carolina recovers it and manages to retrieve the recording in which Renata confesses her schemes and admits she tricked Evandro into signing the bogus purchase. Evandro is consequently freed and the police goes after Renata. She tries to escape from the hospital, but the man who lost his leg earlier in the episode shoots her in the stomach, blaming her schemes for his leg amputation. She is saved by the team, but they have to remove her lungs due to the hospital's lack of equipment. Evandro returns to the mutual aid group with Carolina and Décio and speaks for the first time. After Renata recovers, she confesses all her crimes at court, including Samuel's murder, and the hospital is subsequently closed.

=== Season 3 (2019) ===
No. overall	No. in season	Title	Directed by	Written by	Original release date	Brazil viewers (in points)
21	1	"Episode 1"	Andrucha Waddington	Lucas Paraizo	2 May 2019	N/A
Evandro and Carolina now work as paramedics and respond to medical emergencies in Rio de Janeiro. Carolina goes to a slum to collect a boy who got accidentally punctured with a barbecue skewer, but struggles to find a place where he can be operated; due to the 2018 Brazil truck drivers' strike, hospitals are running low on gasoline for ambulances, oxygen and other essential goods. After Evandro himself convinces strikers to allow a truck carrying several oxygen tanks to pass, he has Décio re-open the surgery rooms in the hospital where they used to work together (Hospital São Tomé Apóstolo, or "Thomas the Apostole Hospital") and the boy is saved. Soon after, Graça sister (Joana Fomm), the sister commanding the hospital, invites Evandro to replace her and Carolina to command the emergency area. They are reluctant at first, citing their intention to join Médecins Sans Frontières, but the whole team insists and Graça asks the couple once again what they think.
22	2	"Episode 2"	Andrucha Waddington	Lucas Paraizo	9 May 2019	N/A
Evandro and Carolina accepted Graça's invitation to work at the hospital. One day, a truck crashes into their car and they find the driver (Paulo de Mello) unconscious and with bullet wounds. Later, two men (Aristeu (César Ferrario) and Vilson (Digão Ribeiro)) arrive at the hospital looking for him (now introduced as Dinho) and tell Evandro he can call them whenever he needs something. As they leave, Aristeu instructs Vilson not to allow Dinho out of the hospital while Evandro tells Carolina he found them suspicious. Meanwhile, teenage violinist Dora (Isabela Mendonça) arrives at the hospital after passing out in the middle of a rehearsal. Examinations reveal an extra rib that causes a thoracic outlet syndrome whenever she lifts up her left arm. The team performs surgery on her so she can keep on her musical path. Vera (Drica Moraes), the new infectologist, arrives at the hospital expressing pessimism about working at another precarious public health facility. An elderly woman named Edineide (Beth Zalcman) arrives with a possible heart attack, but cardiac examinations turn up normal. Deeper investigations reveal a possible tumor and Vera insists she undergoes surgery. Despite traumatized by a recent poorly-performed heart surgery, she accepts and the team finds out the tumor was actually a piece of dressing forgotten inside her chest following the previous surgery. Dinho's wife Jurema (Gabriela Moreyra) reveals Dinho was shot by Aristeu, who is revealed to be the local militia's head. Evandro orders the hospital guard to reinforce security, but he is captured and knocked out before making the call. Aristeu and Vilson provoke a blackout at the hospital and Evandro hides Dinho in a storage room. Aristeu takes Jurema hostage and executes Dinho as he emerges to confront him before taking off with Vilson. Later, Evandro and Carolina attend Dinho's funeral and, back at the hospital, Dora and a string ensemble host a public concert.
23	3	"Episode 3"	Mini Kerti	Lucas Paraizo	16 May 2019	N/A
Evandro and Carolina are at a store and witness saleswoman Aline (Aline de Luna) getting stabbed lby her former boyfriend Douglas (Ricardo Martins), who barely escapes being lynched by other customers. Both are rushed to the hospital; when Aline's current husband Renan (Pierre Santos) arrives and learns Douglas is there, he attempts to execute him, but Carolina convinces him not to do it. Douglas is sent to prison and Renan greets Aline as she regains consciousness. Meanwhile, Charles's former girlfriend Larissa (Nanda Félix) asks him to examine her due to a pain she feels in her chest, but examinations show nothing abnormal. Charles suspects she's making it up since she never got over their split. Further examinations reveal she suffers from pericarditis; Charles admits to Evandro he still loves her and the director replaces him for the surgery. Charles and Larissa share a kiss before she is anesthetized. Later, as she recovers, Charles tries to tell her what he feels, but her fiancée Vinícius (Alex Rech) arrives and he says nothing, leaves the room and cries on Evandro's shoulder.
24	4	"Episode 4"	Rebeca Diniz	Lucas Paraizo	23 May 2019	N/A
Two siblings (Thomas (Sandro Cardoso) and Manuela (Carolina Ferman) go parachuting. Thomas passes out and regains consciousness too close to the ground, managing to pull his cord but still sustaining severe injuries. At the hospital, an intracranial aneurysm is revealed to have been a possible cause for his fainting and he is put in a waiting list for neurosurgery, after which he'll never be able to go parachuting again. Thomas later reveals to Charles that he was aware of his condition but refused to quit parachuting, which he considers his reason to live. Soon after, his state worsens and he dies. Meanwhile, a little girl named Érica (Isabella Aguiar) requires an urgent kidney transplantation; her mother Neuza (Adassa Martins) is not a possibility because she's had cancer before, so the father Célio (Bruno Ferrari) is examined, but he's unexplainably incompatible. Neuza reveals he's actually not the father and he leaves disappointed but returns later with Fábio (Alan Pellegrino), the biological father, who agrees to be a donor. Evandro rushes to the State Health Secretary to have the secretary (Gillray Coutinho) sign the transplantation authorization, but the politician dismisses him due to a last-minute appointment, despite Evandro's pleas. Back at the hospital, Fábio secretly leaves the hospital without donating the organ, but when Thomas dies, Evandro seizes the chance to collect his organs for donation, including a kidney for Érica. Later, the secretary reprehends him for doing the transplant without his signature, but signs a document reactivating the hospital's transplantation program. Also, a man named Igor (Robson Maia) brings his unconscious friend Kleber (Kelner Macêdo), claiming he fell down a flight of stairs. He expresses concerns about being contaminated with AIDS, but Décio says he's fine and he leaves without checking on Kleber. After Kleber awakens, he reveals Igor actually punched him down the stairs after he revealed he was HIV-positive. Cléber hits on Décio, who reluctantly requites due to still exploring his homosexuality. Cléber then gives him a pamphlet of the bar where he works at and Décio meets him there. Later at home, Carolina and Evandro discuss having children, but Carolina says she doesn't feel ready.
25	5	"Episode 5"	Pedro Waddington	Lucas Paraizo	30 May 2019	N/A
A woman named Ariane (Rafaela Mell) has an argument on the street with her little daughter Raquel (Maria Carolina Basílio), who angrily tells her she wished she were dead. Soon after, an explosion hits Ariane and she is rushed to the hospital, but ends up succumbing to her wounds. Since Raquel won't speak to anyone, it isn't until Ariane's purse is finally delivered that Carolina is able to contact her ex-husband (Rafael Sieg), who comes by and comforts Raquel, who feels guilty for her mother's death. Later, Carolina cuts herself due to the episode reminding her of her suicidal mother; Vera catches her and comforts her. Meanwhile, a man named Tarcísio (Rodrigo Penna), brings his son Vander (Lucas Oliveira) to the hospital after he was assaulted by colleagues who were mocking him for the scar he has on his face as a consequence of a prior dog attack. When the nurse Simone comes to treat him, Tarcísio asks if there's another nurse available and she suspects he's being racist; Evandro says he should be ashamed of himself and he angrily leaves with Vander. Later, both return to the hospital after Vander tries to slit his own wrists; a blood transfusion is required to save his life and Simone offers herself as a donor. Evandro says the hospital could perform a plastic surgery on him; Carolina is against, believing Evandro to have bigger priorities, but he uses his authority as director to have the final word on the matter. Also, an elderly woman named Lindaci (Neusa Borges) goes to the hospital feeling a strong headache and is diagnosed with meningitis. Her boyfriend Euclides (Eliezer Motta) insists to check on her, but she is being kept in isolation. When he shows similar symptoms, he is placed on a bed beside her, proposes to her and she accepts. Just in case, Vera and Carolina take a medicine to avoid developing the disease, as well. At a bar, Evandro and Carolina discuss having children again and Carolina reiterates she doesn't want to be a mother while Evandro expresses his dream of becoming a father.
26	6	"Episode 6"	Andrucha Waddington	Lucas Paraizo	6 June 2019	N/A
The hospital is working at full capacity after multiple victims of a landslide in a local favela are brought in. One of the patients, middle-class teenage girl Juliana (Lara Tremouroux), has suffered severe injuries on her left hand; the team manages to save its functions, but they're unable to perform skin grafting due to the lack of decent equipment, so Carolina sews the girl's hand inside her own stomach to allow her skin to regenerate until it can be surgically separated again. Her boyfriend Djalma (Cadu Paschoal) feels guilty for having brought her to the slum, and her parents disapprove of their relationship, but Juliana asks him to stay and says she has no intention of ending their relationship. Another victim, Nadia (Giselle Motta), is informed of her husband's death and immediately blames her neighbor Zilda's (Tati Zucato) husband, a pro-housing activist, since he encouraged people to settle around the area where the disaster happened. The two get into a fight, but Evandro urges everyone to calm down. Later, the leader arrives lifeless at the hospital and Nadia comforts Zilda. Geralda (Simone Mazzer), yet another victim and also a cartomancer, reads Carolina's future and asks if she's pregnant. Carolina says it is impossible because she takes pills and Geralda dies later due to the combination of her wounds and her heavy drinking habit. Later, Carolina takes a pregnancy test and is shocked to see the result.
27	7	"Episode 7"	Mini Kerti	Lucas Paraizo	13 June 2019	N/A
A pregnant inmate named Raiane (Thamiris Mandú) is stabbed in the belly during a prison fight and rushed to the hospital; both mother and daughter are saved, but ultrasound examinations reveal the child has a disease that will require surgery as soon as she's born. Evandro, Carolina and sister Graça insist that the penitentiary allows Raiane to stay until the child is born, to no avail. Raiane attempts to escape, but goes into labor and is rushed to the surgery room, where her daughter is saved. As she boards the van that'll take her back to prison, she asks her once estranged mother (Maria Ceiça) to take care of the little girl, which she'll name after Vera. After becoming increasingly involved with Raiane's condition, Vera reveals to Carolina that she has a son, Leonardo, that was taken from her at the age of 8 after she was arrested for possession of cocaine that actually belonged to her husband; a fact she took a year to prove so she could be released. Since then, she and Leonardo have been estranged. Meanwhile, a woman named Fabiana (Priscila Camargo) has her left breast (the only she had left) removed after Charles and Décio discover a nodule. Following the surgery, she tells her niece Cássia (Patrícia Elizardo), who was accompanying her, to go discover the world and be happy. Soon after, she dies. Cássia asks Charles and Décio to remove both her breasts preemptively, since both her aunt and her mother died of breast cancer, but examinations show she is actually free of any risk, which makes her glad. Throughout the episode, it is revealed that the medicine Carolina took with Vera in the 5th episode interfered with her anti-conceptional pills, facilitating a pregnancy. The episode ends as she reveals the pregnancy to Evandro and they happily exchange hugs and kisses.
28	8	"Episode 8"	Andrucha Waddington & Rebeca Diniz	Lucas Paraizo	20 June 2019	N/A
Two teenage students get into a fight and a teacher named Sueli (Clarice Niskier) ends up hit with a chair as she attempts to separate them. Later, at the hospital, she is treated and the student who hit her, Wallace (Fabricio Assis), is brought by his stepfather (Sérgio Bezerra) to apologize, but Sueli rejects it because the kid clearly regrets nothing. Later, Wallace returns to the hospital after being brutally assaulted by the stepfather and Sueli amicably teaches him some human biology before leaving the hospital. Meanwhile, a woman named Tais (Bruna Trindade) comes to the hospital feeling strange after a beauty procedure carried out under inadequate conditions. She ends up dying and her sister Diana (Ana Flavia Cavalcanti) grows increasingly agitated and even takes some drugs, but Evandro treats her and, under his suggestion and with his company, she attends a session of a mutual aid group for drug addicts. Also, an elderly man named João (Perfeito Fortuna) comes to the hospital after feeling sick and he is revealed to have lung cancer and no more than one year to live. Vera decides not to tell him about his condition and keep him there so they can at least ease his pain, but Décio says they should spare some room for people that can actually be cured; he changes his mind, however, after seeing João fix a faulty elevator door.
29	9	"Episode 9"	Julio Andrade	Lucas Paraizo	26 June 2019	N/A
Roney (Ramon Francisco) and Carminha (Tainá Medina) are having fun at a local festa junina promoted by Aristeu, but things go wrong when he encourages her to jump over the bonfire; she falls and suffer severe burns. At the hospital, Carminha is treated while Roney is consumed with guilt over pressuring her to jump. After overhearing the hospital staff comment that they need a bronchoscope to properly treat her, a desperate Roney approaches Aristeu for help. As Carminha's state worsens, Roney arranges a meeting between Evandro and Aristeu, but the former is unwilling to accept equipment from a criminal. After receiving reluctant thumbs up from Décio, Evandro accepts the offer and Carminha begins to recover. Meanwhile, an elderly man named Alberto (Walter Breda) is treated and Carolina determines he requires surgery; however, both him and his wife Fátima (Narjara Turetta) are afraid because his condition allows him to receive a disability pension from the government and if he's cured, he will lose it and then struggle to find a job due to his age and lack of qualifications. During the surgery, however, his condition turns out to be worse than expected and his leg has to be amputated. As he wakes up, he says Fátima must be happy knowing he will keep his pension, to which she replies she actually rooted for him to heal. As the hospital assembles a task force for a special event in which they'll examine multiple people at once, police officers warn Evandro that there's a shootout between the police and Aristeu's militia and the situation is getting worse there.
30	10	"Episode 10"	Andrucha Waddington & Julio Andrade	Lucas Paraizo	26 June 2019	N/A
As the police raids the nearby favela, Aristeu enters the hospital and forces Carolina to treat a wound on his neck. Evandro stumbles upon them and joins his wife in secretly treating Aristeu. After they're finished, the criminal orders them to evacuate him on an ambulance, but the police spot him and a shootout ensues. Aristeu and his second-in-command Vilson hold the hospital staff and multiple patients hostage in the infirmary and the team urges him to surrender, but Aristeu's backup arrives and the shootout worsens. Carolina risks herself between the bullets to get some plasma for a hemophilic patient who got shot and ends up hit in the belly by a stretcher conducted by a rushing officer. She returns to the patient and the team saves him while the police defeat the thugs. After the procedure, Carolina performs an ultrasound on herself and is shocked to hear no response from her child.
31	11	"Episode 11"	Mini Kerti	Lucas Paraizo	4 July 2019	N/A
Joice (Mariana Cysne) and her son Luan (Pablo Barros) suffer an accident at a local amusement part and are brought to the hospital by the father, Vicente (Daniel Alvim). Evandro finds Carolina passed out at the doctors' dorms. As the team examines her, Evandro is horrified to realize the child is dead and will have to be surgically removed. Meanwhile, Luan's condition worsens and he goes to surgery for a second time; the team almost loses him, but Evandro manages to revive him after over 30 minutes of attempts. Evandro, an atheist, then goes to the hospital's chapel and begs for his wife's survival. The surgery goes well and Charles tells Evandro the child was a boy. Evandro goes check on Carolina. Later, Carolina tells Vera she feels "empty" while Evandro cries at home in the child's would-be bedroom.
32	12	"Episode 12"	Pedro Waddington	Lucas Paraizo	11 July 2019	N/A
After taking some time off to recover from her loss, Carolina resumes work. Luís (Oscar Moyano), a middle-age man, is brought to the hospital struggling to breathe. The team determines he won't live much and they can only prolong his life so long. His wife Elisa (Sandra Corveloni) wants the hospital to keep treating him, while his children from another marriage Alan (Gabriel Calamari) and Luísa (Carolinna Baiocchi) want to respect his will to be euthanized. Carolina is on the siblings' side, while Evandro believes they should look for possible treatments; eventually, their divergence leads to a heated argument involving their lost child and Evandro says Carolina never even wanted it. Luís's family comes to an agreement and they say their last goodbyes. Meanwhile, a foreign couple (Paul (Ole Erdmann) and Susan (Camila Sokolowski)) are brought in after their car was gunned down in a favela which they inadvertently drove into due to an ill-calculated GPS route. Paul won't talk to anyone in the hospital, but after Evandro comments about his personal problems, he finally opens his mouth and says, with an accent, that Evandro shouldn't give up on his wife; the couple recovers and they leave, stating they have no plans to leave Brazil despite the trauma. Evandro tries to apologize to Carolina, but she rejects it. Later, she goes to the hospital chapel, removes her rosary and says she will go on "alone".
33	13	"Episode 13"	Andrucha Waddington & Rebeca Diniz	Lucas Paraizo	18 July 2019	N/A
Carolina wants to divorce, but Evandro won't sign the papers. Later, they argue over how to proceed during a surgery and the patient ends up dying; Décio reprehends them for letting their personal problems get in the way of work. Evandro visits Diana, whom he's been mentoring at mutual aid. They kiss and Evandro leaves, regretful. Meanwhile, Carolina sleeps with a man she met at a nightclub (João Fenerich). Later, she quits her job and Evandro finally agrees to sign the papers. By the end of the episode, Carolina pays Evandro a visit and says they've been blaming themselves for too many things, but after she sees Diana inside the apartment, she just says they both deserve to be happy in their separate paths. Meanwhile, after helping a boy named Otávio find his father, Vera tells João about Leonardo. With Rosa's help, João locates Leonardo and tells him Vera's story. Soon after, he feels sick and is brought to the hospital, where he succumbs to his condition. Leonardo meets Vera by João's grave and they finally reconcile. Also, Charles and Evandro's former professor Miranda trusts them with operating his heart. During the procedure, Evandro can't concentrate and Charles expels him from the room. After Miranda is cured, Evandro thanks Charles for not letting him ruin the surgery and Charles promises not to tell Miranda or Décio about what happened.
34	14	"Episode 14"	Andrucha Waddington & Pedro Waddingtonare	Lucas Paraizo	25 July 2019	N/A
Two couples, (Carla (Gisele Froes)/Eduardo (Augusto Madeira) and Késsia (Ester Dias)/Wilson (Odilson Esteves)) get into a fight following a minor car crash in a parking garage; Wilson ends up hitting Eduardo in the head with a crowbar while Carla shoots Késsia in the neck. At the hospital, Eduardo suffers no major consequences, but Késsia struggles to speak. A frustrated Wilson attacks Carla and she passes out. Later, Wilson and Eduardo discuss their wives' situations in a civil tone. Meanwhile, it's Carolina last day at the hospital and Evandro overdoses on pills; Diana tries to drive him to the hospital, but ends up crashing the car. Carolina operates Evandro against Décio's recommendation, but manages to save him. She talks to Diana, who only sustained minor injuries, and learns she will go back to the countryside and start over. After Evandro awakens, they decide to give their relationship a break so they can fix themselves separately. Two months later, Carolina is treating people in isolated communities of the Amazon and Evandro arrives to join her, having become free of drugs.

=== Plantão Covid (2020) ===
No. overall	No. in season	Title	Directed by	Written by	Original release date	Brazil viewers (in points)
35	1	"Episode 1"	Andrucha Waddington	Lucas Paraizo	6 October 2020	N/A
Returning from their time doing humanitarian work in Northern Brazil, Evandro and Carolina work on a field hospital quickly built by the local government in order to treat people with COVID-19 and are introduced to Dr. Mauro (David Junior), a neurosurgeon called to help the team deal with the ever growing number of patients. One of them is Augusto (Marcos Caruso), a retired orchestra flutist who has lost his will to live and play music after the death of his wife and fellow orchestra musician. Carolina plays some classical music on the radio to help him recover. The situation at the hospital is critical; Charles gets desperate over losing a third patient on a single day, but Evandro reminds him of the many lives they did manage to save. Also, the team is expecting a shipment of ventilators, but when the truck arrives, they find out anaesthetic machines had been sent by mistake. The doctors decide to use one single ventilator on two people simultaneously, despite the risk, and barely save both. Evandro starts manifesting COVID-19 symptoms and is subsequently treated.
36	2	"Episode 2"	Andrucha Waddington	Lucas Paraizo	13 October 2020	N/A
In flashbacks, a young Evandro (Ravel Andrade) has conflicts with his mother (Fabíula Nascimento) for failing to keep his low-pay jobs and for aspiring to be a photographer like his late father - a profession she disdains. A sickness of hers causes Evandro to take her to the local hospital several times, and he ends up befriending Samuel (Stepan Nercessian) and developing an interest in Medicine. Back to the present, Evandro's state worsens and Carolina grows increasingly afraid of losing him. Vera, who has tested positive for the disease but is asymptomatic, comforts her via video calls while on quarantine. Later, Evandro recovers and Carolina greets him as he wakes up. Siblings João (Marcelo Mello Jr.) and Gilda (Luellem de Castro) come to the hospital and Carolina learns she has been trying to keep a strict quarantine while he has been partying like nothing's happening, believing the news about the pandemic to be "exaggerated" . Gilda eventually succumbs and dies and Gilmar says Carolina failed her. Later, as he leaves, he apologizes to Carolina and recognizes his responsibility in his sister's death. After some time off to recover, Evandro resumes work at the hospital, where he delivers a motivational speech to his coworkers, urging people to defend public health and believe in science.

=== Season 4 (2021) ===
No. overall	No. in season	Title	Directed by	Written by	Original release date	Brazil viewers (in points)
37	1	"Episode 1"	Andrucha Waddington	Lucas Paraizo & Márcio Alemão & Pedro Riguetti	12 August 2021	N/A
38	2	"Episode 2"	Andrucha Waddington	Lucas Paraizo & Flavio Araujo	19 August 2021	N/A
39	3	"Episode 3"	Mini Kerti	Lucas Paraizo & Flavio Araujo	26 August 2021	N/A
40	4	"Episode 4"	Rebeca Diniz	Lucas Paraizo & Flavio Araujo	1 September 2021	N/A
41	5	"Episode 5"	Andrucha Waddington & Pedro Waddington	Lucas Paraizo & André Sirangelo & Pedro Riguetti	2 September 2021	N/A
42	6	"Episode 6"	Mini Kerti	Lucas Paraizo & Flavio Araujo & Pedro Riguetti	16 September 2021	N/A
43	7	"Episode 7"	Mini Kerti & Rebeca Diniz	Lucas Paraizo & Márcio Alemão	23 September 2021	N/A
44	8	"Episode 8"	Pedro Waddington	Lucas Paraizo & Márcio Alemão	30 September 2021	N/A
45	9	"Episode 9"	Júlio Andrade	Lucas Paraizo & Flavio Araujo	7 October 2021	N/A
46	10	"Episode 10"	Mini Kerti	Lucas Paraizo & André Sirangelo	13 October 2021	N/A
47	11	"Episode 11"	Andrucha Waddington & Pedro Waddington	Lucas Paraizo & Márcio Alemão & André Sirangelo & Flavio Araujo & Pedro Riguetti	21 October 2021	N/A

== Release ==
=== Broadcast ===
Sob Pressão premiered on 25 July 2017 on TV Globo in Brazil. In Portugal, the series began airing on 1 December 2017 on RTP1. Teleamazonas acquired the broadcast rights for Ecuador and began airing the series on 4 September 2018. In Italy the series premiered on Sky Atlantic on 3 October 2018. In Argentina, the series began airing on 1 January 2019 on Telefe.

== Reception ==
=== Viewership ===
Aired in Brazil since 25 July, in Globo's late prime time, the series attracts a high audience, reaching an average of more than 38 million viewers per episode.

Season	Timeslot (BRT/AMT)	Episodes	First aired		Last aired		TV season	Rank	Avg. viewers (points)
Season	Timeslot (BRT/AMT)	Episodes	Date	Viewers (points)	Date	Viewers (points)	TV season	Rank	Avg. viewers (points)
1	Tuesday 10:30pm	9	25 July 2017	28.2	19 September 2017	27.3	2017	#1	27.45
2	Tuesday 10:30pm	11	9 October 2018	22.5	18 December 2018	21.0	2018	#1	21.3
3	Thursday 10:30pm	14	2 May 2019	19.8	25 July 2019	25.0	2019	#1	22.3

=== Awards and nominations ===
Year	Award	Category	Nominee	Result	Ref
2017	Troféu APCA	Best Series		Won	
2017	Troféu APCA	Best Actor	Júlio Andrade	Won	
2017	Troféu APCA	Best Actress	Marjorie Estiano	Nominated	
2017	Troféu APCA	Best Director	Andrucha Waddington and Mini Kerti	Nominated	
2017	Melhores do Ano	Best Actor in a Series	Júlio Andrade	Won	
2017	Melhores do Ano	Best Actress in a Series	Marjorie Estiano	Won	
2017	Prêmio Contigo! Online	Best Series		Nominated	
2017	Prêmio Contigo! Online	Best Actor - Series	Júlio Andrade	Won	
2017	Prêmio Contigo! Online	Best Actress - Series	Marjorie Estiano	Won	
2017	Prêmio Extra de Televisão	Best Series		Won	
2017	Prêmio Extra de Televisão	Best Actor	Júlio Andrade	Nominated	
2017	Prêmio Extra de Televisão	Best Actress	Marjorie Estiano	Nominated	
2018	Troféu APCA	Dramaturgy		Nominated	
2018	Troféu APCA	Best Actor	Júlio Andrade	Nominated	
2018	Troféu APCA	Best Actress	Marjorie Estiano	Won	
2018	Prêmio Extra de Televisão	Best Series		Won	
2018	Prêmio Extra de Televisão	Best Actor	Júlio Andrade	Nominated	
2018	Prêmio Extra de Televisão	Best Actress	Marjorie Estiano	Nominated	
2018	Prêmio Contigoǃ Online	Best Series		Nominated	
2019	International Emmy Award	Best Performance By an Actress	Marjorie Estiano	Nominated	
2019	Melhores do Ano	Best Actor in a Series	Júlio Andrade	Won	
2019	Melhores do Ano	Best Actress in a Series	Marjorie Estiano	Nominated	
2019	Prêmio Contigo! Online	Best Series		Won	
2019	Prêmio Contigo! Online	Best Actress - Series	Marjorie Estiano	Won	
2019	Prêmio Contigo! Online	Best Actor - Series	Júlio Andrade	Nominated	
2019	Prêmio Contigo! Online	Best Supporting Actress	Drica Moraes	Nominated	
2019	Troféu APCA	Best Series		Nominated	
2019	Troféu APCA	Best Director	Andrucha Waddington	Won	
2019	Troféu APCA	Best Actor	Júlio Andrade	Nominated	
2019	Troféu APCA	Best Actress	Marjorie Estiano	Nominated	
2020	Prêmio Contigo! Online	Best Series		Nominated	
2020	Prêmio Contigo! Online	Best Actress - Series	Marjorie Estiano	Nominated	
2020	Prêmio Contigo! Online	Best Actor - Series	Júlio Andrade	Nominated	
2020	Prêmio Contigo! Online	Best Supporting Actor - Telenovela or Series	Bruno Garcia	Nominated	
2020	Prêmio Contigo! Online	Best Supporting Actress - Telenovela or Series	Josie Antello	Nominated	
2020	Prêmio Contigo! Online	Best Supporting Actress - Telenovela or Series	Roberta Rodrigues	Nominated	
