= Santo (TV series) =

- Created by: Carlos López
- Written by: Carlos López, Miguel Ángel Fernández, Gustavo Lipsztein
- Directed by: Vicente Amorim
- Starring: Raúl Arévalo; Bruno Gagliasso; Victoria Guerra; Greta Fernández
- Countries of origin: Spain; Brazil
- Original languages: Spanish; Portuguese
- No. of seasons: 1
- No. of episodes: 6

Production
- Production companies: Nostromo Pictures; Prodigo Films

Original release
- Network: Netflix
- Release: 16 September 2022

Santo is a Spanish-Brazilian crime action thriller television series with occult detective fiction elements created by Carlos López, directed by Vicente Amorim, and written by Carlo López, Miguel Ángel Fernández, and Gustavo Lipsztein.

== Premise ==
The plot takes place in between Madrid and Salvador. It concerns about two police agents from Spain and Brazil chasing a drug trafficker (Santo) whose face has never been revealed connected to occult-adjacent crimes.

== Cast ==
- Raúl Arévalo as Miguel Millán
- Bruno Gagliasso as Ernesto Cardona
- Victória Guerra as Bárbara Azevedo
- Greta Fernández as Susana "Susi" Jackson
- María Vázquez as Arantxa Rivera

== Production ==
Created by Carlos López, Vicente Amorim took over the direction of the episodes. A co-production for Netflix by companies from Spain and Brazil, Santo was produced by Nostromo Pictures alongside Prodigo Films.

== Release ==
Netflix set a 16 September 2022 release date for the 6-episode series.
