= Erika Marena =

- Occupation: chief of the Federal Police
- Known for: chief of the Federal Police of Brazil in the Operation Car Wash

Érika Mialik Marena is a chief of the Federal Police of Brazil, she is known for her role in Operation Car Wash.

After serving for two years in the operation, Erika was invited to head the area to combat corruption and misappropriation of public funds from the Federal Police's Superintendent in Santa Catarina. In 2016, she was the most voted in a triple list to run for the general direction of the Federal Police command.

In 2017, Erika was portrayed in Brazilian cinema by actress Flavia Alessandra in the movie Polícia Federal: A Lei É para Todos (Federal Police: The Law Is for Everyone).

Still in 2017, she was responsible for the controversial "Ouvidos Moucos" Operation that resulted in the arrest of the chancellor of the Federal University of Santa Catarina (UFSC), Luiz Carlos Cancellier de Olivo, accused of attempted obstruction of justice. Motivated by allegations of Rodolfo Hickel do Prado (corregidor of UFSC by then), the operation blamed the chancellor for the operator, while it was wide spread that it was a resource misuse investigation. Such allegation was related to other people, not Chancellor Luiz. After being accused by Marena, Luiz Carlos Cancellier de Olivo was arrested and removed from the office at the university, as a result of the operation that counted on 115 federal policemen. Luiz Carlos had no criminal record. He was released with a habeas corpus, with the condition that he should not go to the university's campus. Later on, he committed suicide. Delegate Marena was later removed from the case and transferred to the head of the Federal Police in Sergipe. The Ministry of Justice investigated its involvement in the case, and three agreeable opinions decided to close the case against Marena. In February 2021, recordings the hacker Walter Delgatti obtained and testified as truthful by Brazilian Federal Police, were opened by Brazilian Supreme Court to the lawyers defending former president Luiz Inácio Lula da Silva. The recordings showed that Erika Marena had falsified a testimony during Car Wash Operation.
