= Paulo Coelho's Best Story =

2014 film directed by Daniel Augusto

- Theatrical release poster
- Directed by: Daniel Augusto
- Written by: Carolina Kotscho
- Produced by: Iôna de Macêdo; Carolina Kotscho
- Starring: Júlio Andrade; Ravel Andrade; Fabíula Nascimento; Fabiana Guglielmetti; Lucci Ferreira; Enrique Diaz; Letícia Colin; Luís Carlos Miele
- Cinematography: Jacob Solitrenick
- Music by: Pascal Gaigne
- Production companies: Babel Films S.L. Dama Filmes
- Distributed by: Columbia Pictures
- Release date: August 14, 2014
- Running time: 112 minutes
- Countries: Brazil; Spain
- Languages: Portuguese; Spanish

Paulo Coelho's Best Story (Portuguese: Não Pare na Pista) is a 2014 Brazilian-Spanish biographical drama film about the Brazilian lyricist and novelist Paulo Coelho. Directed by Daniel Augusto, it stars Júlio Andrade, Ravel Andrade, Fabíula Nascimento, Fabiana Guglielmetti and Lucci Ferreira.

The film focuses on three different moments of the writer's career — his youth in the 60s (period in which is lived by the actor Ravel Andrade); adulthood in the 80s (Julio Andrade); and maturity, in 2013, when he visits once again Santiago de Compostela.

Using as a basis Paulo Coelho's own statements, the history pervades the most striking moments of the life of the author, as the traumas, the relationship with drugs and religion, sexuality and the partnership with musician Raul Seixas.

== Cast ==
- Júlio Andrade as Paulo Coelho
- Ravel Andrade as Paulo Coelho (young)
- Fabiana Gugli as Christina Oiticica
- Fabíula Nascimento as Lygia Souza
- Enrique Diaz as Pedro Souza
- Lucci Ferreira as Raul Seixas
- Nancho Novo as Jay Anthony Vaquer
