= Júlio Andrade =

Brazilian actor

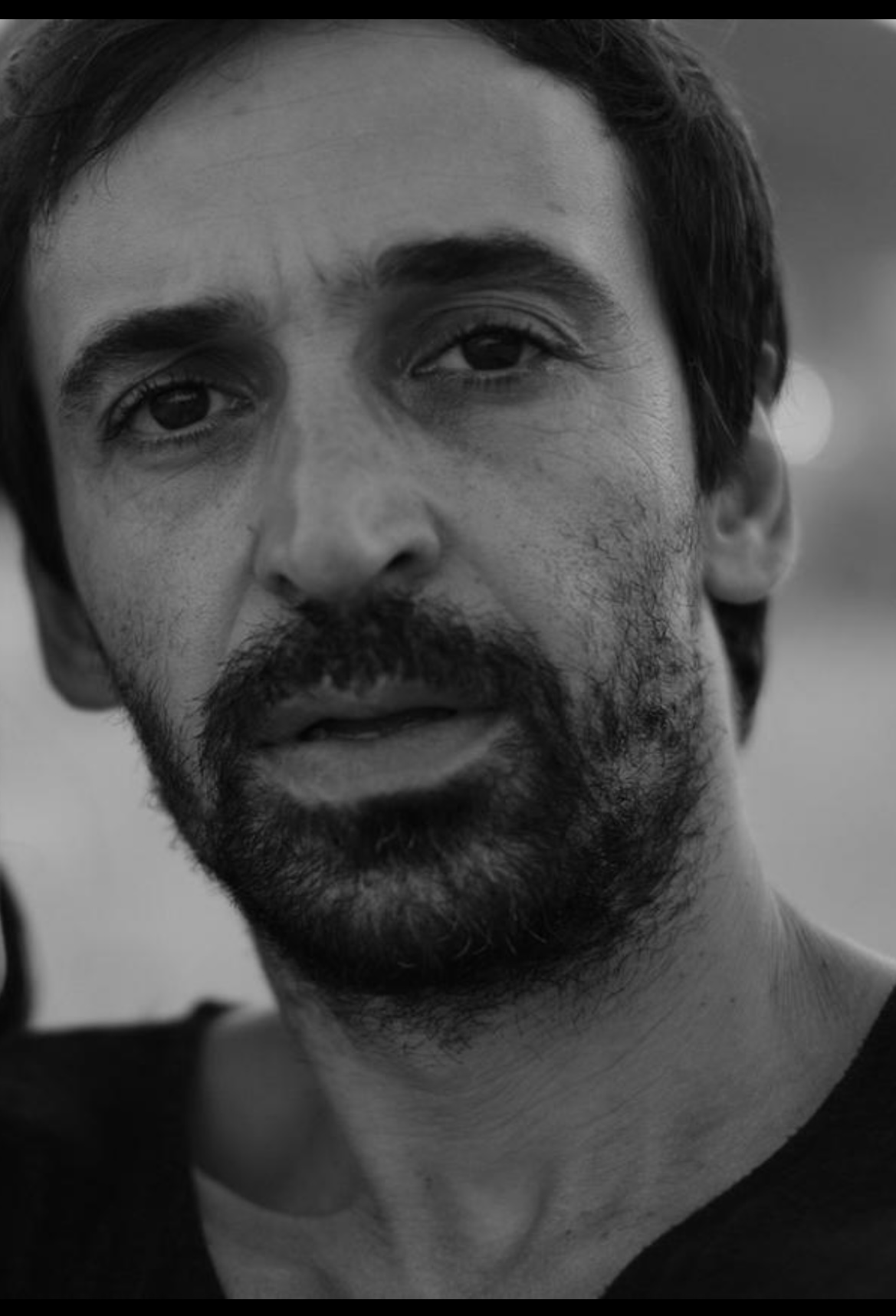
- Andrade in 2023
- Born: 8 October 1976 (age 49); Porto Alegre, Rio Grande do Sul, Brazil
- Occupation(s): Actor, director
- Years active: 1998–present
- Spouse: Elen Clarice
- Children: 1

Júlio Andrade (born 8 October 1976) is a Brazilian actor and director. He has already been nominated twice to the International Emmy Award for Best Actor for his role in 1 Contra Todos.

== Career ==
Started acting for television in the miniseries Luna Caliente. Then in Porto Alegre participating in short films of RBS TV and the Theater Company of Porto Alegre, "Depósito de Teatro", acting in pieces such as Macbeth directed by Patricia Fagundes; I danced in the Curve, by Julio Contee; The Pagador De Promessas, by Dias Gomes; Auto da Compadecida with direction of Roberto Oliveira; and Menino Maluquinho directed by Adriane Motolla.

== Filmography ==
=== Films ===
Year	Title	Role
1998	Velinhas	Julinho
2000	Quem?	Short film
2000	Tolerância	Pizza delivery
2001	Final - Trilogia do Amor Em 16mm - Parte 1	Short film
2002	Mopia	Short film
2003	The Man Who Copied	Feitosa
2004	Meu Tio Matou um Cara	Detective Cicero
2005	Sal de Prata	Holmes
2006	Wood & Stock: Sexo, Orégano e Rock'n'Roll	Overall dubbing
2006	Baptism of Blood	Delator
2006	Cão sem Dono	Ciro
2007	3 Efes	Policial
2009	Mira	Fotógrago
2009	Hotel Atlântico	Artista
2011	A Hora e a Vez de Augusto Matraga	Flosino Capeta
2012	Gonzaga: de Pai pra Filho	Gonzaguinha
2013	Éden	Wagner
2013	Bald Mountain	Joaquim
2014	The Pilgrim	Paulo Coelho
2014	Obra	Mestre da Obra
2014	Entre Nós	Cazé
2014	Trash	Chico, Motorista da Kombi
2015	Road 47	Tenente
2015	Entrando Numa Roubada	Eric
2016	Reza a Lenda	Galego Lorde
2016	Elis	Lennie Dale
2016	Redemoinho	Gildo
2016	Sob Pressão	Dr. Evandro
2016	Maresia	Emilio Vega/Gaspar Dias
2017	Malasartes e o Duelo com a Morte	Morte
2018	Todas as Canções de Amor	

== Television ==
Year	Title	Role	Notes
1999	Luna Caliente	Tenente	
2000	Vidas Prestadas	Adrián González Chávez	
2001	Contos de Inverno	Ernesto	Episode: "The Importance of Curriculum in Artistic Career"
2002	Histórias Curtas	Ladrão	Episode: "Orangutans"
2006	Carga Pesada	Vicente	Episode: "Hostage"
2007	A Grande Família	Lisboa	Episode: "Cheap Operation Flies"
2007	Amazônia, de Galvez a Chico Mendes	João Maia	
2008	Ciranda de Pedra	Patrício	
2009	Caminho das Índias	Sócio de Bahuan no restaurante	Episodes: "April 10–16, 2009"
2009	Por Toda Minha Vida	Raul Seixas	Episode: "Raul Seixas"
2010	Passione	Arthurzinho	
2011	Oscar Freire 279	Beto	
2011	Força-Tarefa	Luciano	Episode: "December 8, 2011"
2011	Homens de Bem	Betinho	
2014	A Teia	Charle	Doce de Mãe
2014	Doce de Mãe	Ignácio	Episode: "January 30, 2014"
2014	O Rebu	Oswaldo	
2016	1 Contra Todos	Doutor (Carlos Eduardo Fortuna)	Protagonist
2016	Justiça	Firmino	
2017-2022	Sob Pressão	Dr. Evandro	Protagonist
2019	Amor de Mãe	Sinésio Viana	
2024	Maria e o Cangaço	Lampião	
2025	Vale Tudo	Rubens Corrêa "Rubinho"	

=== Theater ===
Year	Name
2000	O Menino Maluquinho
2001	O Pagador de Promessas
2001	O Auto da Compadecida
2002	Bailei na Curva
2004	Macbeth

== Awards and nominations ==
=== International Emmy Awards ===
Year	Category	Nominated	Result	Ref.
2017	Best Actor	1 Contra Todos	Nominated	
2018	Best Actor	1 Contra Todos	Nominated	

=== Festival International de Programmes Audiovisuels ===
Year	Category	Nominated	Result	Ref.
2018	Best Actor	Sob Pressão	Won	

=== Platino Awards ===
Year	Category	Nominated	Result	Ref.
2018	Best Actor in a Series	1 Contra Todos	Nominated	
2019	Best Actor in a Series	1 Contra Todos / Sob Pressão	Pending	

=== Brazilian Film Festival of Miami ===
Year	Category	Nominated	Result	Ref.
2019	Best Actor	All Love Songs	Pending	

=== Melhores do Ano ===
Year	Category	Nominated	Result	Ref.
2010	Best Breakthrough Actor	Passione	Nominated	
2017	Best Actor in a Series	Sob Pressão	Won	
2019	Best Actor in a Series	Sob Pressão	Won	

=== Festival de Gramado ===
Year	Category	Nominated	Result	Ref.
2001	Best Actor	Final - Trilogia do Amor Em 16mm - Parte 1	Won	
2008	Best Actor	Um Dia Como Hoje	Won	

=== Rio de Janeiro International Film Festival ===
Year	Category	Nominated	Result	Ref.
2013	Best Actor	Entre Nós	Won	
2016	Best Actor	Redemoinho/Sob Pressão	Won	

=== Troféu APCA ===
Year	Category	Nominated	Result	Ref.
2012	Best Actor	Gonzaga - de Pai pra Filho	Won	
2016	Best Actor	Sob Pressão Films	Won	
2017	Best Actor	Sob Pressão / 1 Contra Todos	Won	
2018	Best Actor	Sob Pressão / 1 Contra Todos	Nominated	
2019	Best Actor	Sob Pressão	Pending	

=== | Grande Prêmio do Cinema Brasileiro ===
Year	Category	Nominated	Result	Ref.
2013	Best Actor	Gonzaga - de Pai pra Filho	Won	

=== | 5th Brazilian International Film Festival ===
Year	Category	Nominated	Result	Ref.
2015	Best Actor	The Pilgrim	Won	

=== 7th Lapa Film Festival ===
Year	Category	Nominated	Result	Ref.
2014	Best Actor	The Pilgrim	Won	

=== Prêmio APTC de Cinema Gaúcho ===
Year	Category	Nominated	Result	Ref.
2000	Best Actor	Quem?	Won	
2003	Best Actor	Miopia	Won	

=== Ibero-American Film Festival ===
Year	Category	Nominated	Result	Ref.
2016	Best Actor	Maresia	Won	

=== Agulhas Negras Film Festival ===
Year	Category	Nominated	Result	Ref.
2007	Best Actor	Cão Sem Dono	Won	

=== Guarani Brazilian Film Award ===
Year	Category	Nominated	Result	Ref.
2007	Best Actor	Cão sem Dono	Nominated	
2009	Best Actor	Hotel Atlântico	Nominated	
2012	Best Actor	Gonzaga - de Pai pra Filho	Won	
2018	Best Supporting Actor	Redemoinho	Nominated	
2019	Best Supporting Actor	Paraíso Perdido	Pending	

=== Botequim Cultural Award ===
Year	Category	Nominated	Result	Ref.
2013	Best Actor	Bald Mountain	Won	

=== Children's Theater Tibicuera Award ===
Year	Category	Nominated	Result	Ref.
2000	Best Actor	O Menino Maluquinho	Won	

=== Prêmio Contigo! de Tv ===
Year	Category	Nominated	Result	Ref.
2017	Best Actor in Série	Sob Pressão	Won	

=== Prêmio Folha de São Paulo ===
Year	Category	Nominated	Result	Ref.
2017	Best Actor in Série	1 Contra Todos	Nominated	

=== Extra Television Award ===
Year	Category	Nominated	Result	Ref.
2017	Best Actor	Sob Pressão	Nominated	
2018	Best Actor	Sob Pressão	Pending	

=== 12° Awards Fiesp / Sesi-SP of Cinema and TV ===
Year	Category	Nominated	Result	Ref.
2018	Best Actor	Sob Pressão	Nominated	

=== Sesc Film Festival ===
Year	Category	Nominated	Result	Ref.
2017	Best Actor	Sob Pressão	Nominated	
2018	Best Actor	Malasartes and the Duel with Death	Nominated	

=== Açorianos Theater Award ===
Year	Category	Nominated	Result	Ref.
2000	Best Supporting Actor	O Pagador de Promessas	Nominated	

=== Prêmio Qualidade Brasil ===
Year	Category	Nominated	Result	Ref.
2008	Best Breakthrough Actor	Ciranda de Pedra	Nominated	

=== Quem Award ===
Year	Category	Nominated	Result	Ref.
2010	Best Supporting Actor	Passione	Nominated	
2014	Best Supporting Actor	O Rebu	Nominated	
2016	Best Movie Actor	Sob Pressão	Nominated	
