= ABS-CBN =

Philippine media network

- Current logo, the second version of the 1999 logo, used since September 7, 2013.
- Country: Philippines
- Broadcast area: Worldwide
- Network: Airtime Leasing (via limited nationwide coverage): ZOE TV/A2Z (since 2020); TV5 and BEAM TV (since 2021); PIE (2022–2023); GMA Network (since 2022); AMBS/All TV (since 2024); PCMC/PRTV Prime Media (since 2024); Solar Entertainment Corporation/Southern Broadcasting Network (since 2025)
- Stations: List of former TV stations
- Headquarters: ELJ Communications Center, Eugenio Lopez Drive, Diliman, Quezon City, Metro Manila, Philippines

Programming
- Languages: Filipino (main); English (secondary)
- Picture format: HDTV 1080i (downscaled to 480i for the SD feed)

Ownership
- Owner: ABS-CBN Corporation
- Key people: Martin "Mark" L. López (Chairman); Carlo L. Katigbak (President and CEO); Cory Vidanes (COO)

History
- Launched: October 23, 1953; 73 years ago (first incarnation); September 14, 1986; 40 years ago (second incarnation; Post-People Power Revolution)
- Founder: James Lindenberg; Antonio Quirino; Eugenio Lopez, Sr. Fernando Lopez
- Replaced: BBC-2/City2 Television (1973–1986)
- Closed: September 23, 1972; 54 years ago (first incarnation; martial law); May 5, 2020; 6 years ago (second incarnation; broadcast franchise lapsed/expired)
- Replaced by: Jeepney TV (ABS-CBN TV Plus channel space until June 30, 2020); A2Z (free-to-air television); Kapamilya Channel (pay television); All TV (VHF 2 and UHF 16 Manila channel space)
- Former names: Alto Broadcasting System (1953–1966); Chronicle Broadcasting Network (1956–1961)

Links
- Website: www.abs-cbn.com

ABS-CBN (Note: an acronym for Alto Broadcasting System – Chronicle Broadcasting Network) is a Philippine media and content distribution company, serving as the flagship media brand of ABS-CBN Corporation, a subsidiary of Lopez Holdings Corporation. Formerly the country's largest free-to-air television network, ABS-CBN has since evolved into a multi-platform content producer and distributor following the expiration and non-renewal of its broadcast franchise in 2020. The company currently syndicates its programming across various platforms, including partner networks, cable channels, streaming services, and digital platforms.

ABS-CBN had its origins in the 1950s. It was the first network in the region to broadcast in color and is historically among the oldest commercial television broadcasters in Asia. In 2007, ABS-CBN transitioned to high-definition (HD) broadcasting ahead of most Philippine networks, and by 2020, it had fully shifted to digital operations following the closure of its terrestrial broadcasts. ABS-CBN is colloquially referred to as and its trade name is the "Kapamilya Network", introduced in 1999 and officially launched in 2003 during its 50th anniversary, and one that remains widely used up to this day.

ABS-CBN is headquartered at the ELJ Communications Center in Quezon City, which houses its offices and production studios. The network is metonymically referred to as "Ignacia," a nod to its headquarters located along Mother Ignacia Street in Quezon City. The company also operates a state-of-the-art secondary production hub at the Horizon IT Park in San Jose del Monte, Bulacan. This facility is used for the production of television programs and films. In February 2025, the company sold a portion of its Quezon City property, including the decommissioned Millennium Transmitter site (which was closed on July 9, 2025), to Ayala Land for mixed-use redevelopment and will take effect in December 2026. ABS-CBN retained ownership of the ELJ Communications Center, which remains its main headquarters, and plans to fully consolidate all of its operations within the complex by July 2026. On August 20, 2025, ABS-CBN and Ayala Land have signed the deeds of absolute sale for the purchase of the sold properties. On August 16, 2026, the gates of the Broadcast Center were closed.

Since 2020, ABS-CBN has remained active as a primary content provider managed by the company and its subsidiaries, which continue to hold its trademark and copyright ownership. The organization shifted its focus to content production and distribution for cable, digital, and international audiences. Its global presence is maintained through various direct-to-consumer services and international distribution. ABS-CBN also delivers content through broadcast partnerships with local networks, which now utilize its former frequencies and transmission facilities. By 2024, ABS-CBN had adopted a diversified revenue model centered on digital platforms, international licensing, and media partnerships, resulting in improved financial performance. In the first quarter of 2025, ABS-CBN generated ₱4.23 billion in consolidated revenue but posted a net loss of ₱425.65 million, nearly halving its losses from the previous year as its content production and distribution business showed continued growth. The company has also set its sights on returning to profitability by 2026.

In June 2025, ABS-CBN announced it would no longer pursue a free-to-air terrestrial television broadcasting license through Congress in order to return to traditional broadcasting, citing the reallocation of their former frequencies to other networks, and will focus on producing media content and prioritize the company's presence online instead.

== History ==
=== As a free-to-air television network (1953–1972; 1986–2020) ===
Bolinao Electronics Corporation (BEC) was founded on June 13, 1946. It was established by James Lindenberg, an American electronics engineer considered to be one of the founding fathers of Philippine television. In 1949, Lindenberg shifted BEC to radio broadcasting with DZBC and planned the introduction of television to the Philippines in 1953.

The logo of Alto Broadcasting System (1953–1957)

The logo of Chronicle Broadcasting Network (1956–1962)

In 1951, Lindenberg partnered with Antonio Quirino, brother of then-Philippine president Elpidio Quirino, to try television broadcasting. In 1952, BEC was renamed Alto Broadcasting System (ABS) with Alto Sales Corporation serving as its corporate name. Alto was a contraction of Quirino and his wife's first names, Tony and Aleli. Despite little resources, ABS was able to put up its transmission tower by July 1953 and imported around 300 television sets. The initial test broadcasts began in September of the same year. The first full broadcast was on October 23, 1953, at a party in Quirino's home. The first program to air was a garden party at the Quirino residence in Sitio Alto, San Juan. After the premiere telecast, the station followed a daily four-hour schedule from 6:00 to 10:00 PM.

The Chronicle Broadcasting Network (CBN) was founded on September 24, 1956, by Eugenio López Sr. and the former Philippine Vice President Fernando Lopez. The network initially focused only on radio broadcasting. On February 24, 1957, it acquired ABS from Quirino and Lindenberg, forming the current ABS-CBN. However, the name was not used until 1961 following the opening of its first regional station in Cebu.

The flagship television station of ABS-CBN was DWWX-TV (ABS-CBN TV-2 Manila). As such, the network was informally referred to as "Channel 2" or "Dos" (Spanish for two) even if the network was seen in other channel numbers elsewhere in the country. The network operated across the Philippine archipelago through the ABS-CBN Regional division which controlled 80 television stations. Its programs are also available outside the Philippines through the global subscription television channel The Filipino Channel (TFC). From 2011 to 2020, the network had on test broadcast for digital terrestrial television using the Japanese standard ISDB-T in select areas in the Philippines. On October 3, 2015, ABS-CBN started to broadcast in high-definition quality through its affiliate direct-to-home cable and satellite television providers.

As of May 5, 2020, all terrestrial broadcast operations have halted completely as per a cease-and desist order from the National Telecommunications Commission. All frequencies formerly assigned to ABS-CBN have since been reassigned to other networks, most notably All TV, which has since aired ABS-CBN content.

=== Shift to online and broadcast syndication (2020–present) ===
ABS-CBN restructured its operations starting 2020, prioritizing and focusing content creation, digital distribution, public relations, designing and creating idents and bumpers for airtime leasing networks, and global partnerships across cable, satellite and over-the-top (OTT) platforms.

On June 13, 2020, ABS-CBN launched the Kapamilya Channel, a 24-hour pay television network designed to continue the company's programming through alternative platforms. Serving as the flagship channel of the company, the channel was introduced with a high-definition feed, replacing the former ABS-CBN HD channel, which originally launched on October 3, 2015. It is available nationwide via major cable and satellite providers, including Streamtech's Planet Cable, Converge ICT's Vision and its sister company Sky Cable. Following its introduction, the company launched Kapamilya Online Live on August 1, 2020, as its flagship free livestreaming service on YouTube and Facebook. The platform features current programming, same-day broadcasts, and archived content, mirroring the shows aired on its cable counterpart with slight variations due to copyright restrictions. It marked the country's first full-day digital entertainment service by a major television network, offering continuous programming through social media livestreams. ABS-CBN merged its streaming services iWant and TFC Online in 2021 to launch the iWantTFC platform, integrating domestic and international content libraries into a single streaming service. The platform offers live channels, video-on-demand, and exclusive digital content. iWant relaunched on July 10, 2025, with enhanced features including support for 4K streaming, aiming to provide an improved viewing experience.

ABS-CBN expanded its domestic television presence through a series of blocktime agreements with multiple broadcast networks. Programming became available on A2Z Channel 11 through a partnership with ZOE Broadcasting Network, followed by a similar arrangement with TV5, which began airing select ABS-CBN shows and later included its primetime lineup. A separate content deal with Advanced Media Broadcasting System allowed ABS-CBN to air current and archived programs on All TV starting in April 2024. The company also launched collaborative projects with its historical rival GMA Network, featuring shared production and on-air crossovers. On May 29, 2025, Media Serbisyo Production Corporation, a joint venture with Prime Media Holdings officially relaunched the DZMM Radyo Patrol 630 and DZMM TeleRadyo brands, resuming 24-hour news and public service broadcasts on AM radio and television. Concurrently, ABS-CBN strengthened its digital distribution by partnering with international streaming platforms such as Netflix, Amazon Prime Video, Viu, HBO Max, iQIYI, and WeTV iflix. On March 16, 2026, all TV networks of ABS-CBN (except A2Z), (Note: A2Z will not rebrand until November 2025, after DZOE shuts down its analog TV broadcast in favor of digital TV.) started using its 2013 logo over the current channel name as digital on-screen graphic, marking the return of its logo on its digital on-screen graphic after almost six years.

== Branding ==
The ABS-CBN logo features three main elements: the vertical line rooted in a horizontal origin, the three extending circles, and the text ABS-CBN, forming the spinning top and balloon shape. These also forms a transmitter broadcasting radio waves, with the three primary additive colors (red, green, and blue) representing the Philippines' three major island groups. The logo also has a horizontal version, with the ABS-CBN text split into two parts, "ABS" and "CBN". The logo uses a custom font designed by the interior designer Wili Fernandez called ABS-CBN Contemera. The logo design was first used in 1968 and has since been updated, with the current iteration introduced in 2013.

Multiple slogans were used by the company in its history, including "The Philippines’ largest network", "The Star Network", and "The Sarimanok". Its current slogan, "In the Service of the Filipino", was introduced in 1989, adding "Worldwide" in 1992 in reference to its global audience primarily composed of overseas Filipino workers. The company also uses its moniker "Kapamilya" (transl. part of the family). Since 2002, the network also releases annual station IDs for summer starting around March and for Christmas around November, featuring upbeat theme songs headlined by its top-billed celebrities.

== Operations ==
The logo of ABS-CBN Studios

ABS-CBN Studios was created on January 5, 1962. It now serves as the core of the ABS-CBN brand, acting as the umbrella for all of the company's content production and distribution operations, including television, film, music, events, talent management, and production facilities. The studio comprises several divisions and works alongside various ABS-CBN subsidiaries, each specializing in areas such as cable channels, international distribution, and digital services. ABS-CBN Studios supplies programming to affiliated platforms owned by ABS-CBN Corporation and collaborates with a range of broadcasting partners across cable, streaming, and digital media. In 2021, the division was rebranded as ABS-CBN Entertainment, but later adopted its current name in 2024.

=== Television ===
ABS-CBN Studios produces a wide range of television content including TV series, variety shows, and game shows for ABS-CBN affiliated platforms. The division, also called the ABS-CBN Entertainment unit, has from its inception focused on the creation and production of television shows. Its production companies include Dreamscape Entertainment and Star Creatives Television.

Among its most prominent programs are the noontime variety show It's Showtime, the Sunday musical variety program ASAP, the reality competition series Pinoy Big Brother; and the primetime action-drama FPJ's Batang Quiapo. Other landmark productions include FPJ's Ang Probinsyano, one of the longest-running action dramas in Philippine television history; the anthology series Maalaala Mo Kaya, regarded as the longest-running drama anthology in Asia, Mga Anghel na Walang Langit, Pangako Sa 'Yo, and May Bukas Pa.

The studio is behind some of the highest-rated and most iconic Filipino teleseryes, such as Tayong Dalawa, a romantic military drama; the original Mara Clara (1992), which aired for over five years; and Esperanza, a highly-rated drama in the 1990s starring Judy Ann Santos. It also pioneered the fantasy drama genre in Philippine television with Marina in 2004.

Notable platforms include:

- Kapamilya Channel, the flagship premium channel, began airing in June 2020 and features ABS-CBN Studios’ primetime dramas, teleseryes, variety shows, news, and special events. The channel is available nationwide and offers content in high definition.
- Kapamilya Online Live, the flagship livestreaming channel of ABS-CBN Studios’ television, delivers real-time broadcasts of its programming via YouTube and Facebook. It was introduced in August 2020 and features interactive elements such as live chat and community engagement.
- The Filipino Channel (TFC), ABS-CBN Studios' international television service, has been available since September 1994 via cable, satellite, IPTV, and digital apps in over 50 countries. TFC simulcasts major ABS-CBN Studios programs and serves as a vital link to the global Filipino community.
- Jeepney TV, which delivers classic and re-broadcast ABS-CBN Studios content through cable and digital partners, was launched in October 2012. Its lineup features previously aired dramas, sitcoms, and variety shows for both local and overseas audiences.
- Metro Channel focuses on lifestyle, food, travel, and fashion content, targeting urban and international viewers. Introduced in April 2018, the channel is also known for airing high-profile ABS-CBN events such as the annual ABS-CBN Ball and Star Magic Ball, as well as previously aired episodes of ASAP.
- Knowledge Channel, which offers educational programming in partnership with the Knowledge Channel Foundation and ABS-CBN Studios, first aired in June 1999. Its lineup includes some of the most recognized Philippine educational shows, such as Sineskwela, Math-Tinik, and Epol/Apple.

ABS-CBN Studios’ content is also syndicated to a wide range of partner channels through blocktime agreements including A2Z, ALLTV, GMA Network, GTV, and TV5. In addition to its core platforms, ABS-CBN distributes content through global streaming services such as Netflix, iWant, Amazon Prime Video, Viu, WeTV iflix, iQIYI, HBO Max, and YouTube.

=== News and public relations ===
ABS-CBN News and Current Affairs, also known as ABS-CBN News, is the news and current affairs division. It is the country's largest international news and broadcast organization, maintaining several foreign news bureaus and offices through ABS-CBN's Global division. It produces two of the longest-running national newscasts in the Philippines: TV Patrol, launched in 1987, is the country's longest-running Tagalog-language primetime newscast; and The World Tonight, which first aired in 1966, is the longest-running English-language television newscast in the country.

The origins of ABS-CBN News can be traced back to the late 1940s and early 1950s, when the news division began as the news section of two Manila-based radio stations: DZBC, which opened in 1949, and DZAQ, which started in 1950, both operated by the Bolinao Electronics Corporation. In 1951, DZRI in Pangasinan was added. These early stations, later absorbed into the Alto Broadcasting System, broadcast news programs and commentary as part of their regular schedules.

Notable platforms include:

- ABS-CBN News Channel (ANC) is the flagship news channel and a 24-hour cable news channel launched in 1996, delivering live news, business updates, and public affairs programming for Filipino and global audiences. It is available in HD and through online streaming.
- DZMM TeleRadyo is the radio and television news and talk channel that simulcasts content from the legacy DZMM 630 AM radio and produces original news, public service, and commentary shows. It continues to operate as a blocktimer on partner channels and through digital streaming.

Meanwhile, ABS-CBN Integrated Corporate Communications, formerly known as ABS-CBN Social Media Newsroom from 2012 to 2018, and also known as ABS-CBN Corporate PR or simply ABS-CBN PR, is similar to ABS-CBN News that gives updates and their reels or videos and images of those but exclusively on show business featuring its artists that are within and related to the network, and about the company and network themselves to represent ABS-CBN Corporation as having overall ownership and authority on them as such they are posted on a newsroom of the media company's website and its social media platforms.

=== Film ===
ABS-CBN Film, best known through its flagship brand Star Cinema, is the film production and distribution arm of ABS-CBN. Established in 1993, it is one of the leading film studio in the Philippines, responsible for some of the country's most successful and influential movies. Since the 2020s, ABS-CBN Film has released some of its titles in cable television and digital platforms such as Netflix, iWant, Viu, Amazon Prime Video, and its official YouTube channel.

=== Music ===
ABS-CBN Music, known primarily as Star Music, and alternatively and secondarily as Star Records since 2014, is the music division under Star Cinema for managing music production and distribution of the company. Founded in 1995, Star Music is one of the Philippines’ leading record labels and provides soundtracks for the company's television shows, films, and digital projects. Some of its sub-labels include Tarsier Records, Star Magic Records, and StarPop and features a roster of popular Filipino artists such as Darren Espanto, Moira Dela Torre, Erik Santos, Morissette, and Jona. The division, together with ABS-CBN Studios' Creative Communications Management (CCM), is also known for producing the network's annual summer and Christmas station IDs. Star Music also holds the entertainment channel MYX and the radio channel and digital music platform MOR. Most recently, ABS-CBN was the winning broadcaster of the first Eurovision Song Contest Asia. The broadcaster are most likely to host the 2nd annual event, taking place in 2027.

=== Talent development ===
Star Magic is the principal talent management and development arm of ABS-CBN, established in 1988 as Discovery. It is known for discovering, training, and managing many of the country's top actors, singers, and media personalities featured in Philippine entertainment industry programs, films, and events. Star Magic provides comprehensive workshops in acting, dance, and personality development, and annually introduces new talent through its Star Magic Circle and other artist launches.

=== Events ===
ABS-CBN Events produces and manages the company's events, including concerts, fan gatherings, network milestone celebrations, and award ceremonies held both in the Philippines and abroad. The division collaborates with its artists, sponsors, and partners to engage audiences. Additionally, ABS-CBN Events provides online access to its productions through dedicated digital ticketing platforms, allowing its viewers worldwide to participate in exclusive concerts, movie premieres, and pay-per-view specials.

- KTX was ABS-CBN's main digital events and ticketing platform, offering e‑tickets for both in-person and online events such as concerts, fan meets, movie premieres, and theater productions. The platform became prominent during the pandemic by enabling communal virtual experiences with features like live chat, multi-camera viewing, and interactive Q&As, hosting events with thousands of paid viewers and providing global access to exclusive content. Its website has since been inactive since November 2025.
- iWant Tickets is an online ticketing and streaming service integrated with iWant, allowing users to purchase tickets for livestreamed and on-demand ABS-CBN events, including musical shows, film premieres, concerts, and pay-per-view specials.

=== Production facilities ===
==== ABS-CBN Broadcasting Center ====
The ABS-CBN Broadcasting Center is the company's headquarters and media complex, located in Diliman, Quezon City. First inaugurated in 1968, it was considered the most advanced television broadcast facility in Asia at the time, serving as the main hub for ABS-CBN's television and radio operations.

The Broadcast Center was also significant for the first EDSA revolution as it was one of the first media networks who was taken over to announced Ferdinand Marcos fleeing the country. It is planned to be demolished on a later date, along with the Millennium Transmitter.

==== ABS-CBN Soundstage ====
The ABS-CBN Soundstage in San Jose del Monte, Bulacan, serves as the company's main production hub. Opened in 2018, the complex features multiple state-of-the-art soundstages, backlot areas, post-production suites, and support facilities. The soundstage complex enables ABS-CBN Studios to produce high-quality television series, films, variety shows, and live events, while supporting co-productions and collaborations with international partners. It is equipped with advanced lighting, audio, and camera systems, as well as adaptable set constructions and dedicated dressing and rehearsal rooms.

== Online presence ==
=== iWant ===
iWant is ABS-CBN's dedicated over-the-top streaming service, offering on-demand access to its catalog of content. The platform features a selection of the television dramas, variety shows, news, documentaries, movies, and exclusive digital series produced by the company. In June 2025, ABS-CBN began unveiling a refreshed interface and streaming experience, with a new look launching on Smart TVs starting June 12. The platform fully relaunched in July 2025, featuring enhanced navigation, updated branding, and support for 4K streaming and cross-device compatibility.

=== YouTube ===
ABS-CBN has multiple YouTube channels. One of its channels, ABS-CBN Entertainment, is the largest YouTube channel in the country by number of subscribers and total accumulated views according to Social Blade. The channel reached 10 million subscribers in 2020. By 2024, it has surpassed 50 million subscribers. As of July 2025, it has over 53 million subscribers and 57 billion views. Its related channel, ABS-CBN News, is the 6th largest in the country by subscribers and views. The channel surpassed 1 million subscribers in 2018, and later reached 10 million subscribers in 2022. As of July 2025, the channel has over 18 million subscribers and 13 billion total views.

As of July 2025, other ABS-CBN affiliated YouTube channels have also built substantial followings. Star Cinema’s official channel, which showcases movie trailers, behind-the-scenes content, and selected full-length Filipino films, has over 11 million subscribers. Star Music, the network's record label, follows closely with around 9.9 million subscribers. The official Pinoy Big Brother channel has amassed more than 7 million subscribers, while the It's Showtime variety show channel has over 2.6 million.

Several episodes of FPJ's Batang Quiapo and Senior High have trended at #1 on YouTube Philippines. The two-hour finale of FPJ's Ang Probinsyano recorded 536,543 live concurrent views on Kapamilya Online Live, setting an all-time high at the time. That record was later broken by FPJ's Batang Quiapo, which reached over 1 million concurrent viewers in February 2025. On the same day, Incognito achieved an all-time high for an ABS-CBN drama pilot with over 508,000 concurrent viewers on its livestream debut.

The success of ABS-CBN's homegrown P-pop group BINI has also contributed to its digital growth. The group's official music videos and performance content, uploaded through Star Music, regularly reach multi‑million viewership. As of mid‑2025, several of BINI's music videos, such as “Pantropiko” and “Salamin, Salamin”, have achieved significant milestones, with over 110 million views and 87 million views respectively.

On November 29, 2025, the channel was briefly terminated along with It's Showtime following an attempted hacking to promote Bitcoin scam via live stream. Because of the incident, Kapamilya Online Live temporarily livestreamed through the iWant YouTube channel. The main channel was restored on December 1, 2025.

=== Netflix ===
ABS-CBN has partnered and produced content for Netflix. The first ABS-CBN television series to be featured was Ang Sa Iyo Ay Akin, which premiered under the title The Law of Revenge in August 2021, while the first ABS-CBN feature film to appear on the platform was Exes Baggage, released as part of a batch of Star Cinema titles in October 2020.

Notable ABS-CBN releases that have reached number one on Netflix Philippines include Incognito, which premiered on January 17, 2025, and immediately claimed the top spot in Netflix PH's TV chart, Sosyal Climbers, ABS-CBN Studios’ first Netflix film collaboration which debuted on February 27, 2025, Hello, Love, Again, premiered on February 13, 2025, A Family Affair, released in 2022; 2 Good 2 Be True, released in May 2022; and Ang sa Iyo ay Akin, a 2020 TV series released in 2021 on Netflix.

In addition to new titles, ABS-CBN's collaboration with Netflix also includes classic and restored Filipino films from the ABS-CBN Film Restoration Project.

=== Spotify ===
ABS-CBN's record label, Star Music, began distributing its catalog on Spotify in 2014 as part of the company's digital expansion strategy. On September 22, 2022, ABS-CBN officially launched its presence on Spotify with the ABS-CBN Hub, the country's first local network podcast hub on the platform. This portal centralized all Kapamilya podcasts including Dear MOR: The Podcast, ANC Podcast, and Kapamilya Chat.

BINI, the leading P-pop girl group under Star Music, achieved several record-breaking milestones on the platform. In March 2025, the group reached 1 billion all-time Spotify streams, and surpassed 6 million monthly listeners by mid-year, making them the most-streamed female OPM act and P-pop group on Spotify. Their single "Pantropiko" became the first song by a Filipino girl group to surpass 100 million Spotify streams by July 2024. Earlier in March 2024, BINI also made history as the first Filipino pop group to top Spotify Philippines’ Daily Top Artists chart. Star Music artist MAKI has gained significant traction on Spotify as well. By mid-2025, his hits including "Saan?" and "Dilaw" regularly appeared in the platform's Daily Top Songs chart for the Philippines, and his total streams exceeded 100 million.

=== Other social media ===
ABS-CBN is also present on other social media sites, including Facebook, X, Instagram, and TikTok. Its main Facebook page currently has around 44 million followers, making it the most followed Philippine media company on the platform. It streams regular programs and special events, often alongside YouTube broadcasts, and engages audiences through emoji reactions, live comments, and real-time polls. Exclusive content such as trailers, reels, and behind-the-scenes videos also draw millions of interactions. The official ABS‑CBN account on X has approximately 1.9 million followers, also the highest among Philippine media companies, offering updates, show highlights, and network announcements. On TikTok, ABS‑CBN has amassed around 11.6 million followers with nearly 982 million likes, making it the country's most followed media organization on the platform, and sharing bite-sized entertainment content and show highlights. ABS‑CBN's primary Instagram account has grown to about 3 million followers, once again leading among Philippine media companies, and features show promos, exclusive clips, and cross-platform event coverage.

== Content syndication ==
=== International ===
ABS-CBN distributes selected drama series, documentaries, and films to regional and international broadcasters, with many titles dubbed or subtitled for audiences across Asia, Europe, Africa, and Latin America. Several TV series produced by the company have gained international traction; for example, Got to Believe, The Legal Wife, and Bridges of Love became popular in Thailand, while Pangako Sa 'Yo was the first Filipino drama to air in Kenya and Tanzania, earning strong ratings. The company has sold over 50,000 hours of content to more than 50 countries. Titles like Mula sa Puso, Sana'y Wala Nang Wakas, Marina, Lobo, Super Inggo, Tayong Dalawa, and Bridges of Love have aired in regions such as Indonesia, Malaysia, Singapore, Thailand, and Peru.

In Latin America, dramas such as Dahil May Isang Ikaw, The Legal Wife, Pangako Sa 'Yo, and Forevermore were dubbed in Spanish and shown in Peru, Ecuador, Colombia, and the Dominican Republic. Bridges of Love aired as Puentes de Amor on Argentina's Telefe. More recent titles like Dahil May Isang Ikaw, Kadenang Ginto, and A Love to Last continued this momentum.

In Africa, a distribution deal with StarTimes enabled the broadcast of Filipino series in over 30 Sub-Saharan countries. Dramas including Ang Probinsyano (Brothers), Kadenang Ginto (The Heiress), and A Soldier's Heart were dubbed in Swahili, Hausa, and French. Bagong Umaga aired in 41 countries, and titles like Asintado reached French-speaking territories such as Côte d'Ivoire and La Réunion. Content was also offered via regional streaming platforms in Egypt and Nigeria.

In Asia, ABS-CBN expanded through syndication and format licensing. In Indonesia, the 2015 remake of Pangako Sa 'Yo aired as Janjiku on MNCTV, followed by the Bahasa-dubbed broadcast of The Iron Heart on ANTV in 2023. In Malaysia, ABS-CBN made its free-to-air debut in 2022 via TVS 122, airing primetime dramas with Bahasa Malaysia subtitles.

In Turkey, ABS-CBN dramas such as The Legal Wife (aired as Kocamı Affet), Bridges of Love, and Forevermore were dubbed in Turkish and broadcast on local networks specializing in international dramas. An English-dubbed version of Darna was also released via StarTimes in Africa following its Indonesian run.

ABS-CBN is a founding member of the Smart Alliance, a regional consortium formed in 2009 alongside Mediacorp, Media Prima, BBTV, and MNC that promotes collaboration in content sharing, co-productions, and digital media innovation.

=== Licensing ===
In addition to syndicating finished content, ABS-CBN has licensed several of its drama series and program formats for remake in foreign markets. The most notable example is Pangako Sa 'Yo, which was adapted in Indonesia in 2014 as Janji Hati by RCTI, starring Aliando Syarief and Michelle Ziudith. Other series such as Sana Maulit Muli and Mara Clara inspired Indonesian remakes, including Cinta Satu Malam and Putri Yang Ditukar, respectively.

In 2022, the drama Hanggang Saan became the first ABS-CBN scripted series to be officially adapted in Turkey, premiering on Kanal D as A Mother's Guilt.More recently, Love Thy Woman entered development for an Indonesian remake.

ABS-CBN has also exported unscripted and variety formats. Notably, the noontime variety show It's Showtime was franchised in Indonesia as It's Showtime Indonesia, which premiered on MNCTV in 2019 and ran until May 2020. The localized version featured both Indonesian hosts and Filipino guest performers, adapting core segments for Indonesian audiences while preserving the essence of the original format.

=== Content acquisition ===
ABS-CBN's International Acquisitions team is responsible for sourcing, licensing, and acquiring foreign content to enhance the network's programming lineup for both Philippine and international audiences. This division operates under the International Sales & Distribution unit and negotiates with global studios, distributors, and content owners across Asia, the Americas, Europe, and beyond.

A landmark acquisition was the Taiwanese drama Meteor Garden, which aired in 2003 and became very popular nationwide. Its popularity is often cited as one of the reasons for the eventual surge of the so-called "Asianovela" series shown in the country, primarily composed of South Korean drama series. Following Meteor Garden, ABS-CBN continued to import top Asian dramas such as Boys Over Flowers, Princess Hours, Dream High, Lovers in Paris, The Kitchen Musical, and Goblin, as well as Latin American telenovelas including María Mercedes, Rosalinda, and Rubí, along with Western series such as Alias, The X-Files, Buffy the Vampire Slayer, Charmed, Mr. Bean, Baywatch, Monarch and Liar.

ABS-CBN has also been renowned for acquiring and popularizing anime and children's programs. Anime series such as Judy Abbott, Princess Sarah, Cedie, Heidi, and Marcelino Pan y Vino became very popular during the 1990s and 2000s. The network also introduced anime and animated titles including Hana Yori Dango, Cardcaptor Sakura, Fruits Basket, Naruto, Akazukin Chacha, Wedding Peach, Yu-Gi-Oh!, Digimon, Looney Tunes/Merrie Melodies (from RPN), Tom and Jerry (from IBC 13), Scooby-Doo, Oddbods and The Simpsons. The network further diversified its lineup for younger audiences by airing international preschool shows such as Bear in the Big Blue House and Peppa Pig.

ABS-CBN also played a key role in popularizing tokusatsu in the Philippines. Notable titles broadcast by the network include the various titles on the Super Sentai franchises, Ultraman Ace, Chōdenshi Bioman, and Kamen Rider Agito.

Meanwhile, ABS-CBN International Productions distributes series produced by ABS-CBN Studios for the international market. Series that were distributed by them are Cattleya Killer and The Silent Noise.

== Competition ==
In 1992, AGB Nielsen Philippines was founded. In 2007, TNS Philippines started to offer media research through Kantar Media Philippines (formerly Kantar/TNS). In 2008, AGB Nielsen Philippines released the list of all-time highest rating shows in the Philippines, with 7 of the top 10 highest rating shows all from ABS-CBN with the shows like The Battle: Pacquiao vs. Morales, Rosalinda, Esperanza, Meteor Garden, Pangako Sa 'Yo, Miss Universe 1994, and María Mercedes.

== Controversies and scandals ==
=== 2004 copyright infringement with GMA ===
On July 22, 2004, during the arrival of Angelo de la Cruz, a truck driver who was held hostage and threatened with beheading in Iraq abducted by armed rebels west of Baghdad while trucking fuel from Saudi Arabia, at Ninoy Aquino International Airport, live breaking news coverage was aired on GMA Network and other television stations in the Philippines. GMA Network used audio-video coverage from Reuters, which the network was subscribed to. During the broadcast, a live feed from Reuters was simultaneously aired with its own live broadcast. During the first five seconds of the live feed, GMA Network noticed that the live feed from Reuters was also airing from its main competitor ABS-CBN. The live video was restricted only to ABS-CBN and Reuters did not inform GMA Network that the video coverage was only intended for ABS-CBN. The Court of Appeals declined the case filed by ABS-CBN Corporation against GMA Network Inc. for allegations of illegal duplication of its live video footage. In a ruling, the local fourth division of the appellate court set aside the resolution of the Department of Justice, which approved the filing of the violation of Republic Act 8293 (the Intellectual Property Code) against GMA Network. It ruled out that the act of GMA Network airing the live video coverage was focused on good faith since there was no intent to instigate damage to ABS-CBN. The local court also said GMA Network acted in good faith when it immediately stopped using the live video feed from Reuters upon learning ABS-CBN was also covering the event and its following exertion to authenticate the ABS-CBN Corporation restriction arrangement with the news service, Reuters. The court also stressed that apart from the lack of intent of GMA Network to affect the video from ABS-CBN, the action did not contravene Sections 212.4 and 185.1 of Republic Act 8293 since it was a short excerpt.

=== Wowowee scandals and incidents ===
Two major incidents involving ABS-CBN have involved the network's variety show Wowowee. The first incident was a demand for tickets to a one-year anniversary episode of the show at the PhilSports Arena in 2006 caused a deadly crowd crush killing 76 people. Over a year later in August 2007, the show became entrenched in another scandal involving the possibility of a new game on the show being rigged as evident by a "mechanical glitch" which occurred during an episode, which grew greater after Eat Bulaga! host Joey de Leon and Wowowee host Willie Revillame started exchanging attacks on-air against each other during their respective and competing shows. The incident later led to a probe by the Department of Trade and Industry led by senator Mar Roxas.

=== AGB Nielsen TV ratings scandal ===
In late 2007, ABS-CBN and GMA Network accused AGB Nielsen Philippines of tampering with the ratings during their 2007 ratings surveys.

=== ABS-CBN vs. Willing Willie copyright case ===
ABS-CBN demanded ₱127 million from their former reality show star, Willie Revillame, citing copyright infringement due to stark similarities in Revillame's show, Willing Willie on TV5, and ABS-CBN's Wowowee. ABS-CBN listed five acts of plagiarism allegedly committed by Willing Willie in their complaint as follows:

1. Willing Willie's opening song and dance number was similar to that of Wowowee.
2. "BIGA-Ten" and "Big Time Ka", both segments from the shows involved, bear similar names.
3. "Willie of Fortune" and "Willtime Bigtime" are segments from both shows which resemble each other. ABS-CBN claimed that "Willtime Bigtime" resembled its show as it also showcases contestants relaying their personal stories before proceeding to play a singing/trivia game.
4. April "Congratulations" Gustilo was one of several backup dancers from Wowowee who also appear in 'Willing Willie'.
5. Other striking similarities ABS-CBN claimed are found in Willing Willie's set design, stage, studio viewers' seats lay-out, lighting angles and camera angles.

A 25-page ruling dated May 22, 2015, dismissed the case against Revillame. After the Quezon City regional trial court demanded a ₱400 million bond from Revillame to answer any further damage the network might sustain, the fee was waived.

=== 2020 Broadcasting shutdown and franchise renewal controversy ===
Since April 2017, ABS-CBN was attacked by former president Rodrigo Duterte, as the network refused to air his 2016 presidential campaign ads in favor of a smear ad paid for by vice presidential candidate Antonio Trillanes. However, according to Commission on Elections spokesperson James Jimenez, the controversial ad was within election law, under "Partisan Political Activity". Duterte publicly stated that he would oppose the 25-year franchise renewal of ABS-CBN, and former Laguna governor E.R. Ejercito supported his plan. Opposition lawmakers as well as labor groups objected to Duterte's stance on ABS-CBN, as the franchise's non-renewal would compromise the employees of the network; stating that the blocking of the franchise renewal had no merit. Opposition groups also claimed that the non-renewal of the franchise violates press freedom.

Under Philippine law, broadcasting networks require a congressional franchise to operate television and radio stations for 25 years; the absence of one will lead to the suspension of its operations. ABS-CBN's legislative franchise, which was approved by the virtue of Republic Act No. 7966 granted on March 30, 1995, was scheduled to expire on May 4, 2020, because the franchise would become effective fifteen days after its publication on the Official Gazette on April 19, 1995. At least 12 lawmakers have filed their own versions for a new franchise of the network. House Speaker Alan Peter Cayetano assured that Congress will tackle the franchise with fairness.

On February 24, 2020, the CEO of the network apologized to Duterte for not airing his political advertisements during his 2016 polls, which Duterte accepted, and Congress made its decision to investigate their franchise renewal.

During a Senate hearing on the same day, public services panel chair Grace Poe stated they were to investigate ABS-CBN's compliance with the terms and conditions of its franchise. The Senate concluded that there was no breach of laws or franchise terms.

On May 5, 2020, the National Telecommunications Commission issued a cease and desist order to stop the entire network's broadcast, including its radio stations DZMM and MOR, following the expiration of its broadcast franchise the day before. The cease and desist order covers 42 television stations operated by ABS-CBN across the country, including Channel 2, 10 digital broadcast channels, 18 FM stations, and 5 AM stations.

The network subsequently signed off following TV Patrol. Along with the order, NTC wanted to recall ABS-CBN's assigned frequencies. ABS-CBN explained that it would not be in public interest to have the frequencies recalled, as this would hinder their ability to immediately restart broadcasts in the event a new franchise was granted. Additionally, there were fresh measures in the Congress to grant provisional franchise, which later rolled into a series of hearings to grant a fresh 25-year franchise. NTC was told to refrain from carrying out the recall by the Congress. On July 10, 2020, members of the House of Representatives, voted 70–11 to deny ABS-CBN's renewal franchise application, citing several issues on the network's prior 25-year franchise. According to a survey released by the Social Weather Stations following the rejection of the network's franchise renewal, 75% of Filipinos want the network back.

In January 2025, Albay Representative Joey Salceda filed House Bill 11252, the fifth bill that seeks to grant ABS-CBN's television and radio broadcasting franchise for another 25 years.

== Reception ==
Channels and programs of ABS-CBN have been recognized by the Academy of Television Arts & Sciences giving several accolades in different categories, primarily the International Emmy Awards, although none of them won a single award.

=== Program ===
==== Best Arts Programming ====
| Year | Recipient(s) | English title | Original title | Status | Milestone/notes |
|---|---|---|---|---|---|
| 2020 | ABS-CBN Corporation | Jake and Charice | | Nominated | (Note: Co-produced with Japan's NHK) |

==== Best Drama Series ====
| Year | Recipient(s) | English title | Original title | Status | Milestone/notes |
|---|---|---|---|---|---|
| 2013 | ABS-CBN Corporation | Maalaala Mo Kaya | | Nominated | |

==== Best Telenovela ====
| Year | Recipient(s) | English title | Original title | Status | Milestone/notes |
|---|---|---|---|---|---|
| 2009 | Rondel P. Lindayag | A Time for Us | Kahit Isang Saglit | Nominated | |
| 2010 | Narciso Y. Gulmatico, Jr. | Destined Hearts | Dahil May Isang Ikaw | Nominated | |
| 2011 | Laurenti Dyogi | Precious Hearts Romances Presents: Impostor | | Nominated | |
| 2016 | Henry King Quitain | Bridges of Love | | Nominated | |

==== Best Kids: Live-Action ====
| Year | Recipient(s) | English title | Original title | Status | Milestone/notes |
|---|---|---|---|---|---|
| 2017 | ABS-CBN Corporation | Once Upon a Time | Wansapanataym: Candy's Crush | Nominated | |

==== News ====
| Year | English title | Original title | Production company/network | Status | Milestone/notes |
|---|---|---|---|---|---|
| 2008 | Bandila: The Subic Rape Case Promulgation | | ABS-CBN | Nominated | |
| 2017 | TV Patrol: Super Typhoon Lawin's Trail of Damage | | ABS-CBN | Nominated | |

=== Performance ===
==== Best Actor ====
| Year | Recipient(s) | English title | Original title | Role | Status | Milestone/notes |
|---|---|---|---|---|---|---|
| 2010 | Sid Lucero | Destined Hearts | Dahil May Isang Ikaw | Alfred "Red" Ramirez | Nominated | |
| 2017 | Zanjoe Marudo | Would You Remember? | Maalaala Mo Kaya | Victor | Nominated | |

==== Best Actress ====
| Year | Recipient(s) | English title | Original title | Role | Status | Milestone/notes |
|---|---|---|---|---|---|---|
| 2008 | Angel Locsin | She Wolf: The Last Sentinel | Lobo | Lyka Raymundo | Nominated | |
| 2015 | Jodi Sta. Maria | The Promise | Pangako sa 'Yo | Amor Powers | Nominated | |
