= International Emmy Award for Best Telenovela =

Television award category

- Country: United States
- Presented by: International Academy of Television Arts and Sciences
- First award: 2008
- Currently held by: The Good and The Bad; Turkey (2025)
- Website: www.iemmys.tv

The International Emmy Award for Best Telenovela is presented by the International Academy of Television Arts & Sciences (IATAS) and recognizes excellence in telenovelas produced and originally aired outside the United States. The first International Emmy for Telenovela was presented at the 36th International Emmy Awards Gala in 2008, in New York City.

== History ==
The category was created in 2008 by the board of the International Academy of Television Arts & Sciences to honor telenovelas produced and originally broadcast outside the United States. Until 2007, telenovelas were nominated in the Best Drama Series category of the international competition, such as Sinhá Moça (2006), which was the first telenovela ever nominated for an Emmy.

Brazil's Globo is the television network with the highest number of nominations — 12 in total — winning in 2009, 2012, 2013, 2014, 2015, 2016, and 2020. It also co-produced Laços de Sangue (2011) with Portuguese network SIC, which won that year.

Considered the most prominent event in the international television industry, the International Emmy Awards recognize excellence in television produced outside the United States, as well as U.S. primetime programs produced in languages other than English.

== Rules and Regulations ==
The International Emmy for Best Telenovela is awarded to a melodramatic production with a continuous storyline, typically running for at least half an hour per episode, and consisting of between 50 and 220 episodes in total. Telenovelas are usually broadcast two to six times per week and generally feature romance as the central theme.

== Winners and nominees ==
=== 2000s ===
Year	English title	Original title	Recipients	Production company /Network	Country
2008	The Invasion	الاجتياح	Talal Al Awamleh	Arab Telemedia Group	Jordan
2008	Lalola		Sebastián Ortega	Dori Media International / América TV	Argentina
2008	Tropical Paradise	Paraíso Tropical	Gilberto Braga and Ricardo Linhares	TV Globo	Brazil
2008	One Night of Love	Одна ночь любви	Lisa Seidman	AMEDIA / Sony Pictures Television International / STS	Russia
2009	India: A Love Story	Caminho das Índias	Glória Perez	TV Globo	Brazil
2009	Magdusa Ka		Wilma Galvante	GMA Network	Philippines
2009	A Time for Us	Kahit Isang Saglit	Rondel P. Lindayag	Double Vision / ABS-CBN	Philippines
2009	Second Chance	Seconde chance	Nathalie Abdelnour, Elsa Marpeau, Mathieu Missoffe and Elodie Namer	Fontana / TF1	France

=== 2010s ===
Year	English title	Original title	Recipients	Production company /Network	Country
2010	My Love	Meu Amor	António Barreira	Plural Entertainment / TVI	Portugal
2010	Ciega a Citas		Carolina Aguirre	Dori Media International / Rosstoc / TV Pública	Argentina
2010	Destined Hearts	Dahil May Isang Ikaw	Narciso Y. Gulmatico, Jr.	ABS-CBN	Philippines
2011	Blood Ties	Laços de Sangue	Pedro Lopes	TV Globo / SP Televisao / SIC	Portugal
2011	Contra Las Cuerdas		Juan Pablo Domenech and Santiago Mitre	ON TV Llorente & Villarruel Contenidos / TV Pública	Argentina
2011	Destiny River	Araguaia	Walther Negrão	TV Globo	Brazil
2011	Precious Hearts Romances Presents: Impostor		Laurenti Dyogi	ABS-CBN	Philippines
2012	The Illusionist	O Astro	Alcides Nogueira and Geraldo Carneiro	TV Globo	Brazil
2012	Iron Daughters-in-Law	불굴의 며느리	Ku Hyun Sook	MBC	South Korea
2012	The Fire of the Rose	Rosa Fogo	Patrícia Müller	SP Televisão / SIC	Portugal
2012	Holy Remedy	Remédio Santo	António Barreira	Plural Entertainment Portugal / TVI	Portugal
2013	Side by Side	Lado a Lado	João Ximenes Braga and Claudia Lage	TV Globo	Brazil
2013	Windeck		Joana Jorge and Coréon Dú	Semba Comunicação / TPA	Angola
2013	Brazil Avenue	Avenida Brasil	João Emanuel Carneiro	TV Globo	Brazil
2013	30 Lives	30 vies	Fabienne Larouche	Aetios Productions / Ici Radio-Canada Télé	Canada
2014	Precious Pearl	Joia Rara	Duca Rachid and Thelma Guedes	TV Globo	Brazil
2014	Belmonte		Artur Ribeiro	Plural Entertainment Portugal / TVI	Portugal
2014	My Husband's Lover		Suzette Doctolero	GMA Network	Philippines
2014	30 Lives: Maxim Bouchard	30 vies	Fabienne Larouche	Aetios Productions / Ici Radio-Canada Télé	Canada
2015	Império		Aguinaldo Silva	TV Globo	Brazil
2015	Ciega a citas		Verónica Fernández	Dori Media International / Cuatro	Spain
2015	Jikulumessu		Coréon Dú	Semba Comunicação / TPA	Angola
2015	Women	Mulheres	Raquel Palermo and Eduarda Laia	Plural Entertainment Portugal / TVI	Portugal
2016	Hidden Truths	Verdades Secretas	Walcyr Carrasco	TV Globo	Brazil
2016	30 Lives: Samuel Pagé	30 vies	Fabienne Larouche	Aetios Productions / Ici Radio-Canada Télé	Canada
2016	Rules of the Game	A Regra do Jogo	João Emanuel Carneiro	TV Globo	Brazil
2016	Bridges of Love		Henry King Quitain	ABS-CBN	Philippines
2017	Endless Love	Kara Sevda	Kerem Çatay	Ay Yapım / Star TV	Turkey
2017	30 Lives: Isabelle Cousineau	30 vies	Fabienne Larouche	Aetios Productions / Ici Radio-Canada Télé	Canada
2017	Old River	Velho Chico	Benedito Ruy Barbosa, Edmara Barbosa and Bruno Luperi	TV Globo	Brazil
2017	Total Dreamer	Totalmente Demais	Rosane Svartman and Paulo Halm	TV Globo	Brazil
2018	The Payback	Ouro Verde	Maria João Costa	Plural Entertainment Portugal / TVI	Portugal
2018	Brave and Beautiful	Cesur ve Güzel	Kerem Çatay and Pelin Diştaş Yaşaroğlu	Ay Yapım / Star TV	Turkey
2018	İstanbullu Gelin		Teşrik-i Mesai	O3 Medya / Global Agency / Star TV	Turkey
2018	Paquita la del Barrio		Andrés Posada, Ximena Cantuarias and Juan Pablo Posada	Sony Pictures Television / Grupo Imagen / Teleset	Mexico
2019	The Queen of Flow	La Reina del Flow	Claudia Sánchez and Said Chamie	Teleset / Caracol Televisión	Colombia
2019	100 Days to Fall in Love	100 días para enamorarse	Sebastián Ortega	Underground / Telefe	Argentina
2019	The River		Phathu Makwarela and Gwydion Beynon	Tshedza Pictures / 1Magic	South Africa
2019	Tangled Lives	Vidas Opostas	Alexandre Castro	SP Televisão / SIC	Portugal

=== 2020s ===
Year	English title	Original title	Recipients	Production company /Network	Country
2020	Orphans of a Nation	Órfãos da Terra	Duca Rachid and Thelma Guedes	TV Globo	Brazil
2020	Love and Destiny	宸汐缘	Zhao Na, Chen Liwen and Jiang Yuehua	Gcoo Entertainment / iQIYI	China
2020	On Thin Ice	Na Corda Bamba	Rui Vilhena	Plural Entertainment Portugal / TVI	Portugal
2020	Pequeña Victoria		Erika Halvorsen and Daniel Burman	Viacom International Studios / Oficina Burman / Telefe	Argentina
2021	The Song of Glory	锦绣南歌	Huang Bin and Li Huizhu	Zhejiang Huace Film & TV / Croton Cultural Media / Croton Entertainment / Oasis Studio	China
2021	A Mother's Love	Amor de Mãe	Manuela Dias	TV Globo	Brazil
2021	Destiny	Quer o Destino	Helena Amaral	Plural Entertainment / TVI	Portugal
2021	A Quest to Heal	我的女侠罗明依	Siew Hui Koh and Doreen Yap	Mediacorp Channel 8	Singapore
2022	The King's Affection	연모	Ki Min-soo, Hong Seok-gu	KBS / Netflix / Monster Union / Arc Media	South Korea
2022	Nos Tempos do Imperador		Thereza Falcão, Alessandro Marson	TV Globo	Brazil
2022	Two Lives	Dos Vidas	Josep Cister Rubio	Bambú Producciones / RTVE	Spain
2022	You Are My Hero	你是我的城池营垒	Zhang Tong	Gcoo Entertainment / China Huace Film & TV / Croton Cultural Media / Beijing Le Ben Film Media / Jindun Film / Television Culture Center	China
2023	Family Secrets	Yargı	Sema Ergenekon	Ay Yapım	Turkey
2023	Cara e Coragem		Claudia Souto	TV Globo	Brazil
2023	Pantanal		Benedito Ruy Barbosa	TV Globo	Brazil
2023	Forever	Para Sempre	André Ramalho	Plural Entertainment	Portugal
2024	The Vow	La promesa	Josep Cister Rubio	Bambu Producciones / RTVE	Spain
2024	Salón de Té La Moderna		Humberto Miró Garrido	Boomerang TV / RTVE	Spain
2024	Rigo		Cesar Augusto Betancur	Estudios RCN	Colombia
2024	Safir		Mehmet Yigit Alp	ATV / NTC	Turkey
2025	The Good & The Bad	Deha	Kerem Çatay	Ay Yapım	Turkey
2025	Crazy About You	Mania de Você	João Emanuel Carneiro	TV Globo	Brazil
2025	Return to Las Sabinas	Regreso a Las Sabinas	Eulàlia Carrillo	Diagonal TV / Disney+	Spain
2025	Wild Valley	Valle salvaje	Josep Cister Rubio	StudioCanal / RTVE	Spain
2026	Garota do Momento		Alessandra Poggi	TV Globo	Brazil
2026	Leyla	Leyla: Hayat… Aşk… Adalet...	Kerem Çatay	Ay Yapım	Turkey
2026	Far Away	Uzak Şehir	Kerem Çatay	Ay Yapım	Turkey
2026	Wild Valley	Valle salvaje	Josep Cister Rubio	Studio Canal / RTVE	Spain

== Multiple nominations and wins ==
=== By country ===
Country	Nominations	Wins
Brazil	16	7
Portugal	11	3
Turkey	6	3
Spain	6	1
China	3	1
Colombia	2	1
South Korea	2	1
Jordan	1	1
Philippines	6	0
Argentina	5	0
Canada	4	0
Angola	2	0

=== By television network ===
Network	Nominations	Wins
(Brazil) TV Globo	17	8
(Portugal) TVI	7	2
(Spain) RTVE	5	1
(Portugal) SIC	3	1
(Turkey) Star TV	3	1
(China) Tencent Video	2	1
(Colombia) Caracol Televisión	1	1
(Jordan) Arab Telemedia Group	1	1
Ici Radio-Canada Télé	4	0
(Philippines) ABS-CBN	4	0
(Angola) TPA	2	0
(Argentina) TV Pública	2	0
(Philippines) GMA Network	2	0
