= International Emmy Award for Best Arts Programming =

Television award category

- Country: United States
- Presented by: International Academy of Television Arts and Sciences
- First award: 2002
- Currently held by: Ryuichi Sakamoto: Last Days; Japan (2025)
- Website: www.iemmys.tv

The International Emmy Award for Best Arts Programming is presented by the International Academy of Television Arts & Sciences (IATAS) to the best arts programs produced and initially aired outside the United States.

== Rules and Regulations ==
According to the rules of the International Academy, arts programming is defined as a program dedicated to an art form or artist(s) (e.g., performance, art documentary, art series, or a combination thereof).

If the program is part of a continuous series of self-contained episodes (i.e., each episode has its own storyline and conclusion; or each episode may have a different director and/or producer; or the series has the potential to continue for multiple seasons), then each episode must be submitted as a separate entry.

If the program is a multi-part series with a finite number of episodes (with no further episodes planned), covering the same theme, two (2) episodes must be submitted to represent the series as a whole.

If the program consists of multiple parts with a continuing storyline across episodes, or shares the same concept throughout, two (2) episodes must be submitted to represent the series as a whole. The program may employ partial reenactments, stock footage, stills, animation, stop-motion, or other techniques, as long as the emphasis is on fact rather than fiction.

== Winners and nominees ==
=== 2000s ===
Year	English title	Original title	Production company/Network	Country
2002	Dracula: Pages from a Virgin's Diary		CBS	Canada
2002	Touch		NPS	Netherlands
2002	The Tragedy of Hamlet		ARTE France / BBC	France
2002	Classic Albums: Elton John - Goodbye Yellow Brick Road		Isis Production / Eagle Rock Entertainment	Japan
2003	Arena: The Life and Times of Count Luchino Visconti		BBC	United Kingdom
2003	Viaje al Centro de la Música		Canal 13	Chile
2003	Visions of Space: Antoni Gaudi		BBC	United Kingdom
2003	Living Architecture: The Work of Tadao Ando		NHK	Japan
2004	George Orwell: A Life in Pictures		BBC	United Kingdom
2004	Korda, Fotografo en Revolucion		Ateneo Producciones / Canal Once	Mexico
2004	Ameila		Amerimage-Spectra / Media Principia	Canada
2004	Cinema Dalí		Televisió de Catalunya / France 5	Spain / France
2005	Holocaust - A Musical Memorial Film from Auschwitz		BBC	United Kingdom
2005	Bergman and the Cinema	Bergman och filmen	SVT	Sweden
2005	Bergman and Faro Island	Bergman och Faro	SVT	Sweden
2005	Arena: Bacon's Arena		BBC	United Kingdom
2006	Knowledge is the Beginning		ZDF	Germany
2006	John Peel's Record Box		Channel 4	United Kingdom
2006	Soul Deep: The Story of Black Popular Music		BBC	United Kingdom
2006	I Am Dali: Secrets of a Genius		NHK	Japan
2007	Simon Schama's Power of Art		BBC	United Kingdom
2007	Elis Regina: All My Life	Por Toda Minha Vida: Elis Regina	Rede Globo	Brazil
2007	False Waltz		Orkater / AVRO Television	Netherlands
2007	Smile		NHK	Japan
2008	Strictly Bolshoi		Ballet Boyz / Channel 4	United Kingdom
2008	Nara Leão: All My Life	Por Toda Minha Vida: Nara Leão	Rede Globo	Brazil
2008	Richard Serra - To See is to Think		ZDF / WDR	Germany
2008	Inheriting a Kabuki Legacy - Ichikawa Ebizo: His Fate and Anguish		Fuji TV	Japan
2009	The Mona Lisa Curse		Channel 4	United Kingdom
2009	Mamonas Assassinas: All My Life	Por Toda Minha Vida: Mamonas Assassinas	Rede Globo	Brazil
2009	Ode to Joy: 10,000 Voices Resound!		MBS	Japan
2009	Seven Gates of Jerusalem		Telewizja Polska	Poland

=== 2010s ===
Year	English title	Original title	Production company/Network	Country
2010	The World According to Ion B.	Lumea văzută de Ion B.	HBO Romania	Romania
2010	Cazuza: All My Life	Por Toda Minha Vida: Cazuza	Rede Globo	Brazil
2010	Imagine...David Hockney: A Bigger Picture		BBC	United Kingdom
2010	Personas Inside Out		TV Asahi	Japan
2011	Gareth Malone Goes to Glyndebourne		Twenty Twenty	United Kingdom
2011	In der Werkstatt Beethovens - Die Neunte, Thielemann und die Wiener Philharmoniker		ZDF	Germany
2011	Adoniran Barbosa: All My Life	Por Toda Minha Vida: Adoniran Barbosa	Rede Globo	Brazil
2011	Memories of Origin - Hiroshi Sugimoto the Contemporary Artist		Wowow	Japan
2012	Songs of War	Musik als Waffe	ZDF	Germany
2012	Cartola: All My Life	Por Toda Minha Vida: Cartola	Rede Globo	Brazil
2012	BLUE MAN		Wowow	Japan
2012	Queen: Days of Our Lives		BBC / Eagle Rock Entertainment	United Kingdom
2013	Hello?! Orchestra		MBC / Cen Media	South Korea
2013	Freddie Mercury: The Great Pretender		BBC / Eagle Rock Entertainment	United Kingdom
2013	Soundtrack		Geronimo BVBA	Belgium
2013	Miradas Múltiples (La máquina loca)		Teveunam	Mexico
2014	The Exhibition		Jove Pictures	Canada
2014	El Informe Kliksberg II - El otro me importa		Canal Encuentro/Mulata Films	Argentina
2014	Nonfiction W: Picture Book Touch, Feel, and Fragility		Wowow	Japan
2014	The Wagner Files	Wagnerwahn - Mythos und Machenschaften des Richard Wagner	SWR / Arte	Germany
2015	The Man Who Saved the Louvre	Illustre & Inconnu: Comment Jacques Jaujard a Sauvé le Louvre	Ladybird Films	France
2015	Buenaventura, Don't Leave Me	Buenaventura No Me Dejes Mas	Caracol Televisión / Laberinto Producciones	Colombia
2015	Messiah at the Foundling Hospital		Reef Television	United Kingdom
2015	Trial of Chunhyyang – A Girl Prosecuted by Feudalism		KBS	South Korea
2016	The Man Who Shot Hiroshima		WOWOW / Kmax Co.	Japan
2016	Interrupt this Program (Resilient Cities)		Noble Television / Story Park Inc.	Canada
2016	Gabo, The Magic of Reality	Gabo, la creación de Gabriel García Márquez	Discovery / Caracol Televisión	Colombia
2016	Gérard Depardieu: Out of Frame	Gérard Depardieu: Grandeur Nature	Kaliste Prod. / R. M. Production / France 5	France
2017	Hip-Hop Evolution		Banger Films	Canada
2017	Never-Ending Man: Hayao Miyazaki	Owaranai Hito Miyazaki Hayao	NHK	Japan
2017	Portátil		Porta dos Fundos / Comedy Central	Brazil
2017	Robin's Road Trip	Robin de Puy - Ik ben het allemaal zelf	Talent United/AVROTROS/CoBO	Netherlands
2018	Etgar Keret: Based on a True Story	Etgar Keret, gebaseerd op een waar verhaal	Baldr Film / NTR Television	Netherlands
2018	Dreaming of a Jewish Christmas		Riddle Films	Canada
2018	Palavras em Série		GNT / Hungry Man	Brazil
2018	David Stratton's Story of Australian Cinema		Stranger Than Fiction Films	Australia
2019	Dance or Die		A Witfilm / NTR	Netherlands
2019	John and Yoko: Above Us Only Sky		Eagle Rock Films	United Kingdom
2019	Michel Legrand, Let The Music Play	Michael Legrand: Sans demi-mesure	Cinétévé / Arte	France
2019	Ópera Alberta: Os Pescadores de Pérolas		HBO Brazil / O2 Filmes	Brazil

=== 2020s ===
Year	English title	Original title	Production company/Network	Country
2020	Vertige de la chute		Babel Doc / France Televisions	France
2020	Jake and Charice		NHK	Japan
2020	Refavela 40		HBO Brasil / Conspiração Filmes	Brazil
2020	Why do we Dance?		Sky Arts	United Kingdom
2021	Kubrick by Kubrick		Temps Noir / Telemark / ARTE	France
2021	Romeo and Juliet: Beyond Words		Footwork Films	United Kingdom
2021	Kabuki Actors’ Anguish – Is Entertainment Nonessential?	Nakamura-ya family 2020 Mattemashita! Kankuro Shichinosuke Shiren to Kassai no Makuake SP	Fuji TV / Kyodo Television	Japan
2021	Emicida – Amarelo: It's All For Yesterday	Emicida – Amarelo: E Tudo Para Ontem	Netflix	Brazil
2022	Freddie Mercury: The Final Act		Rogan Productions	United Kingdom
2022	Bios: Calamaro		Buena Vista / Nat Geo	Argentina
2022	Wonderful World: A New York Jazz Story		NHK	Japan
2022	Charlie Chaplin, The Genius of Liberty	Charlie Chaplin, Le Génie de la Liberté	France Télévisions / Kuiv Productions	France
2023	Buffy Sainte-Marie		Eagle Vision / White Pine Pictures	Canada
2023	Art Is Our Voice		NHK	Japan
2023	Los Tigres Del Norte: Historias Que Contar		Prime Video / Filmadora	Mexico
2023	Music Under the Swastika‚ The Maestro and the Cellist of Auschwitz		3B-Produktion / Deutsche Welle	Germany
2024	Pianoforte		Telemark	Poland
2024	Robbie Williams		RSA Films / Netflix	United Kingdom
2024	Virgilio		House of Chef / Astromax	Argentina
2024	Who I Am Life		WOWOW Inc. / Wood's Office	Japan
2025	Ryuichi Sakamoto: Last Days	Last Days 坂本龍一 最期の日々	NHK (Japan Broadcasting Corporation)	Japan
2025	Art Matters with Melvyn Bragg		Oxford Films / Sky Arts	United Kingdom
2025	DJ Mehdi: Made In France		Ultra Magnetic / 360 Creative / Unité / Arte France	France
2025	Herchcovitch; Exposed	Herchcovitch, Exposto	Mood Hunter	Brazil
2026	Copy + Paste + Steal		The Moving Visuals Co.	Singapore
2026	The Talented Mr. F.	Der Talentierte Mr. F	Neue Flimmer Gmbh / mdr / BR / Ard Kultur / Rbb / HR	Germany
2026	Live Aid: When Rock 'n' Roll Took on the World		Brook Lapping, A Zinc Media Label	United Kingdom
2026	Uncredited – The Story of Passinho	Passinho Foda – O Corre Por Trás da Dança	Red Bull Media House / Capuri	Brazil

== See also ==
- List of International Emmy Award winners
