= 38th International Emmy Awards =

2010 awards ceremony

- Promotional poster
- Date: November 22, 2010
- Location: New York Hilton Midtown; New York City
- Hosted by: Jason Priestley

Highlights
- Founders Award: Simon Cowell

The 38th International Emmy Awards took place on November 22, 2010, in New York City, and was hosted by actor Jason Priestley. The award ceremony, presented by the International Academy of Television Arts and Sciences (IATAS), honors all TV programming produced and originally aired outside the United States.

== Ceremony ==
Nominations for the 38th International Emmy Awards were announced on October 4, 2010, by the International Academy of Television Arts & Sciences (IATAS) at a Press Conference at Mipcom in Cannes. There are 39 nominees in 10 categories. The nominees were selected over six months by a composite panel of 700 judges representing 50 countries. The British TV led, like last year, most of the International Emmys, which awards the television programs made outside the United States.

Helena Bonham Carter was awarded as best actress for her role as Enid Blyton in BBC's Enid. Bob Hoskins won the best actor award for his role in The Street, awarded in turn, as best drama series. The United Kingdom also won the best children's program awards (Shaun the Sheep) and best miniseries or TV movie, with Small Island. This year Portugal won his first Emmy for the telenovela Meu Amor. The best comedy award went to Traffic Light, an Israeli production. Romania won in the Arts Programming category with The World According to Ion B. and South Korea won for the first time in the documentary category with Mom and the Red Bean Cake.

In addition to the presentation of the International Emmy Awards for programming, the International Academy honored Lorne Michaels with the Directorate Award, and Simon Cowell with the Founders Award.

=== Presenters ===
The following individuals, listed in order of appearance, presented awards.

Name(s)	Role
Jason Priestley	Host from 38th annual International Emmy Awards
Christine Ebersole	Presenter of the award for Arts Programming
Eli Wallach	Presenter of the award for Best Actor
Tony Goldwyn; Ruth Wilson	Presenters of the award for Best Actress
Seth Meyers	Presenter of the award for Best Comedy Series
Victor Garber	Presenter of the award for Best Documentary
Elisabeth Moss	Presenter of the award for Best Drama Series
Peter Facinelli	Presenter of the award for Best Non-Scripted Entertainment
Alinne Moraes; Bruno Mazzeo	Presenters of the award for Best Telenovela
Matthew Modine	Presenters of the award for Best TV movie or Mini-Series
Melissa Joan Hart; Will Estes	Presenters of the award for Best Children & Young People Series
Jimmy Fallon; Alec Baldwin	Presenters of the award for Emmy Founders
Rupert Murdoch	Presenter of the award for Emmy Directorate

== Winners ==
Best Telenovela	Best Drama Series
My Love (Portugal) (TVI); Ciega a citas (Argentina) (Dori Media Group); Dahil May Isang Ikaw (Philippines) (ABS-CBN)	The Street (United Kingdom) (BBC); Epitaphs (Argentina) (HBO Latin America/Pol-ka); The Killing (Denmark) (DR/ZDF/NRK/SVT); Saka no Ue no Kumo (Japan) (NHK)
Best TV Movie or Miniseries	Best Arts Programming
Small Island (United Kingdom) (BBC); Hopeville (South Africa) (Curious Pictures/Heartlines/SABC); Som & Fúria (Brazil) (Rede Globo/O2 Filmes); The Author of Himself (Germany) (TE/WDR)	The World According to Ion B. (Romania) (HBO Romania); Por Toda Minha Vida: Cazuza (Brazil) (Rede Globo); Imagine (United Kingdom) (BBC/Coluga Pictures); Personas Inside Out (Japan) (TV Asahi)
Best Comedy Series	Best Documentary
Traffic Light (Israel) (Keshet); The Pretenders (Mexico) (Sony Channel); Peep Show (United Kingdom) (Objective Productions/Channel 4); Talok Hok Chak (Thailand) (Workpoint/Channel 5)	Mom and the Red Bean Cake (South Korea) (MBC); 9/11: Phone Calls from the Towers (United Kingdom) (Channel 4); Kuarup: A alma perdida vai voltar (Brazil) (Rede Globo); Je gaat dood zoals je geleefd hebt (Netherlands) (KRO)
Best Actor	Best Actress
Bob Hoskins in The Street (United Kingdom) (BBC); Sebastian Koch in Sea Wolf (Germany) (Clasart/Gate Film/RHI/TMG/ZDF); Sid Lucero in Dahil May Isang Ikaw (Philippines) (ABS-CBN); Leonardo Sbaraglia in Epitafios (Argentina) (HBO Latin America/Pol-ka)	Helena Bonham Carter in Enid (United Kingdom) (BBC); Lília Cabral in Seize the Day (Brazil) (Rede Globo); Lerato Moloisane in Home Affairs (South Africa) (SABC); Iris Berben in Krupp: A Family Between War and Peace (Germany) (MOOVIE/ZDF)
Best Non-Scripted Entertainment	Best Children & Young People Program
Whoever May Fall (Argentina) (Cuatro Cabezas); Heston's Feasts (United Kingdom) (Optomen Television/Channel 4); Remembering School (Netherlands) (KRO/Screentime Entertainment); Run for Money (Japan) (Fuji Television)	Shaun the Sheep (United Kingdom) (Aardman Animations/WDRmg/BBC); 13 at War (Netherlands) (NPO Broadcasting); Dó-Ré-Mi-Fábrica (Brazil) (Rede Globo); Happy Birthday (Japan) (Fuji Television)

== Most major nominations ==
By country

- United Kingdom — 9
- Brazil — 5

By network

- BBC — 6
- Rede Globo — 5

== Most major awards ==
By country

- United Kingdom — 5

By network

- BBC — 5
