= Fernanda Montenegro filmography =

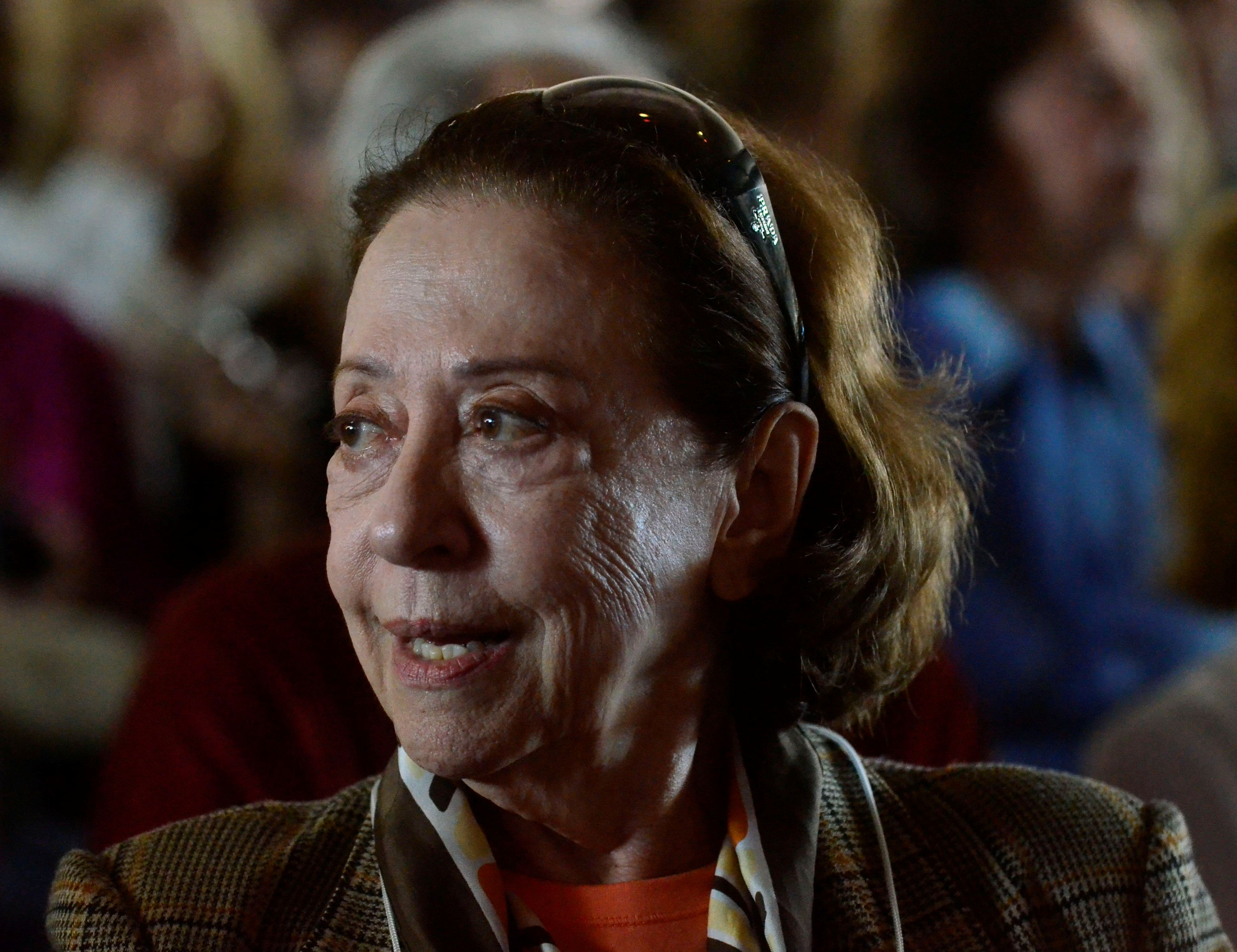
Montenegro in 2014.

This is a complete filmography of Fernanda Montenegro, a Brazilian actress.

== Filmography ==
=== Films ===
Year	Title	Role
1965	The Deceased	Zulmira
1970	Pecado Mortal	Fernanda
1970	Em Família	Anita
1971	A Vida de Jesus Cristo	Samaritana
1978	Tudo Bem	Elvira Barata
1981	They Don't Wear Black Tie	Romana
1985	Hour of the Star	Madame Carlota
1986	Trancado por Dentro	Ivette
1988	Fogo e Paixão	Castle Queen
1994	Rio's Love Song	
1997	Four Days in September	Dona Margarida
1998	Central Station	Dora Teixeira
1998	Traição	Woman at the bar
1999	Gêmeas	Mother
2000	A Dog's Will	Virgin Mary
2004	Redeemer	Dona Isaura
2004	Home on the Range	Mrs. Calloway
2004	Olga	Leocádia Prestes
2004	The Other Side of the Street	Regina
2005	The House of Sand	D. Maria / Áurea
2007	Love in the Time of Cholera	Tránsito Ariza
2012	A Dama do Estácio	Zulmira
2013	Time and the Wind	Bibiana Terra
2013	Boa Sorte	Célia
2013	A Igreja do Diabo	
2013	A Primeira Missa	Ente da Floresta
2014	Rio, Eu Te Amo	Dona Fulana
2014	Infância	Dona Mocinha
2018	O Beijo no Asfalto	D. Matilde
2019	The Invisible Life of Eurídice Gusmão	Eurídice Gusmão
2019	Piedade	Carminha
2020	Lina Bo Bardi - A Marvelous Entanglement	Lina Bo Bardi (older)
2024	I'm Still Here	Eunice Paiva (older)
2025	Vitória	Dona Nina/Vitória
2026	Velhos Bandidos	Marta

=== Television ===
Year	Title	Role
1951–1954	Retrospectiva do Teatro Universal	Various roles
1951–1954	Retrospectiva do Teatro Brasileiro	Various roles
1954	A Muralha	Ana Cardoso
1956–1960	Grande Teatro Tupi	Various roles
1963	A Morta Sem Espelho	Heloísa
1963	Pouco Amor Não é Amor	Marília
1964	Sonho de Amor	Camila Mariano
1964	Vitória	Vitória
1966	Calúnia	Amália
1966	Redenção	Lisa
1968	A Muralha	Cândida Olinto
1969	Sangue do Meu Sangue	Júlia
1973	Medeia	Medeia
1979	Cara a Cara	Ingrid von Herbert
1981	Brilhante	Chica Newman
1981	Baila Comigo	Sílvia Toledo
1983	Guerra dos Sexos	Charlô
1986	Cambalacho	Naná
1987	Sassaricando	Herself
1990	Riacho Doce	Grandma Manuela
1990	Rainha da Sucata	Salomé
1992	O Dono do Mundo	Olga Portela
1993	O Mapa da Mina	Madalena
1993	Renascer	Jacutinga
1994	Incidente em Antares	Quitéria Campolargo
1995	A Próxima Vítima	Charlô
1995	Comédia da Vida Privada	Aunt Otávia
1996	Comédia da Vida Privada	Dora
1997	Zazá	Zazá
1998	Casseta & Planeta, Urgente!	Various
1999	O Belo e as Feras	Clotilde
1999	Você Decide	Lourdes
2001	As Filhas da Mãe	Lucinda Maria Barbosa Cavalcante / Lulu de Luxemburgo
2002	Pastores da Noite	Tibéria
2002	Esperança	Luísa
2003	Celebridade	Herself
2004	Um Só Coração	Herself
2005	Hoje É Dia de Maria	The stepmother
2005	Belíssima	Bia Falcão
2008	The Little Emperor's Christmas	Narrator
2008	Queridos Amigos	Iraci
2009	Som & Fúria	Herself
2010	Passione	Elizabete "Bete" Monteiro Gouveia
2012	As Brasileiras	Maria
2012–2014	Sweet Mother	Maria Izabel "Picucha" de Souza
2013	Saramandaia	Cândida Rosado
2015	Babilônia	Teresa Petrucceli
2016–2018	Mister Brau	Rosita da Silva Gomes
2017	O Outro Lado do Paraíso	Mercedes Santos Tavares
2019	A Dona do Pedaço	Dulce Ramirez

=== Stage work ===
Year	Title	Role	Note
1954	O Canto da Cotovia		by Jean Anouilh – Directed by Gianni Ratto
1955	A Flea in Her Ear		by Georges Feydeau – Directed by Gianni Ratto
1955	A Moratória		de Jorge de Andrade – Directed by Gianni Ratto
1956	Eurydice		by Jean Anouilh – Directed by Gianni Ratto
1958	Vestir os Nus		by Luigi Pirandello – Directed by Alberto D'Aversa
1959	O Mambembe		by Arthur Azevedo and José Piza. Directed by Gianni Ratto
1960	Mrs. Warren's Profession		by George Bernard Shaw – Directed by Gianni Ratto
1960	A Flea in Her Ear		by Georges Feydeau – Directed by Gianni Ratto
1961	O Beijo no Asfalto		by Nelson Rodrigues – Directed by Fernando Torres
1963	Maria	Maria	by Jean Kerr – Directed by Adolfo Celi
1966	O Homem do Princípio ao Fim		by Millôr Fernandes – Directed by Fernando Torres
1967	A Volta ao Lar		by Harold Pinter – Directed by Fernando Torres
1970	Oh! Que Belos Dias		by Samuel Beckett – Directed by Ivan de Albuquerque
1971	Computa, Computador, Computa		by Millor Fernandes – Directed by Carlos Kroeber
1972	Seria Cômico ... Se Não Fosse Trágico		by Friedrich Dürrenmatt – Directed by Celso Nunes
1976	A Mais Sólida Mansão		
1977	É ..., De Millôr Fernandes		Directed by Paulo José
1982	The Bitter Tears of Petra von Kant		by Rainer Werner Fassbinder – Directed by Celso Nunes
1986	Fedra		by Jean Racine – Directed by Augusto Boal
1987	Dona Doida		based on works by Adélia Prado – Directed by Naum Alves de Souza
1993	The Flash and Crash Days		by Gerald Thomas – Directed by Gerald Thomas
1995/96	Happy Days		by Samuel Beckett – Directed by Jacqueline Laurence
1998	Da Gaivota		from the play The Seagull, by Anton Chekhov – Directed by Daniela Thomas
2009	Viver em tempos mortos		
