= International Emmy Award for Best Comedy Series =

International Emmy Award for best comedy series
- Awarded for: Best Comedy Series
- Country: United States
- Presented by: International Academy of Television Arts and Sciences
- First award: 2003
- Currently held by: Ludwig; United Kingdom (2025)
- Website: www.iemmys.tv

The International Emmy Award for Best Comedy Series is presented by the International Academy of Television Arts & Sciences (IATAS) to the best comedy television series, produced and initially aired outside the United States.

== Rules and Regulations ==
According to the International Academy's rules, the award is given to a program primarily devoted to humor with scripted dialogue (e.g., skits, comedies, sitcoms, parodies, stand-up, etc.). The program must meet the minimum format length of a televised half-hour time slot.

If the show is classified as a drama, its comedic elements must be predominant. If the program is a series, only one episode may be submitted as a representative; multiple submissions from the same series are not permitted.

== Winners and nominees ==
=== 2000s ===
Year	English title	Original title	Production company/Network	Country
2003	The Kumars at No. 42		BBC	United Kingdom
2003	Alt und durchgeknallt		Brainpool TV	Germany
2003	The Perfect Manual		TV Asahi	Japan
2003	Lenny Henry in Pieces		BBC	United Kingdom
2004	Berlin, Berlin		ARD	Germany
2004	Corner Gas		CTV Television Network	Canada
2004	The Newsroom		CBC Television	Canada
2004	Stokvel		Penguin Films	South Africa
2005	The Newsroom		CBC Television	Canada
2005	Little Britain		BBC	United Kingdom
2005	Berlin, Berlin		ARD	Germany
2005	Ohne Worte		Sony Pictures / RTL Television	Germany
2006	Little Britain		BBC	United Kingdom
2006	Paare		Sony Pictures / Arte	Germany
2006	Os Amadores		Rede Globo	Brazil
2006	The IT Crowd		Channel 4	United Kingdom
2007	Little Britain		BBC	United Kingdom
2007	Alle lieben Jimmy		RTL	Germany
2007	Os Amadores		Rede Globo	Brazil
2007	NEO – Office Chuckles	サラリーマンNEO	NHK	Japan
2007	Sorted		SABC 3	South Africa
2008	The IT Crowd		Channel 4	United Kingdom
2008	Geile Zeit		Sony Pictures / RTL	Germany
2008	Mi Problema con las Mujeres		Frecuencia Latina	Peru
2008	NEO – Office Chuckles	サラリーマンNEO	NHK	Japan
2009	Hoshi Shinichi's Short Shorts		NHK	Japan
2009	Peter Kay's Britain's Got the Pop Factor		Channel 4	United Kingdom
2009	Ó Paí, Ó		Rede Globo	Brazil
2009	Türkisch für Anfänger		ARD-Werbung / GmbH	Germany

=== 2010s ===
Year	English title	Original title	Production company/Network	Country
2010	Traffic Light	Ramzor	Channel 2	Israel
2010	Los Simuladores		Televisa	Mexico
2010	Peep Show		Channel 4	United Kingdom
2010	Talok Hok Chak		Workpoint Entertainment / Channel 5	Thailand
2011	Benidorm Bastards		Shelter / VMMA	Belgium
2011	Breaking Up	Separação?!	Rede Globo	Brazil
2011	Facejacker		Channel 4	United Kingdom
2011	The Noose		MediaCorp	Singapore
2012	The Invisible Woman	A Mulher Invisível	Rede Globo	Brazil
2012	Absolutely Fabulous		Saunders & French Productions / BBC Studios BBC America / Logo / BBC One	United Kingdom
2012	Spy		Sky1	United Kingdom
2012	What If?	Wat Als?	Shelter	Belgium
2013	Moone Boy		Sky1	United Kingdom
2013	Late Nite News with Loyiso Gola		eNews Channel Africa	South Africa
2013	WorkinGirls		Canal+	France
2013	How to Enjoy the End of the World	Como Aproveitar o Fim do Mundo	Rede Globo	Brazil
2014	What If?	Wat Als?	Shelter	Belgium
2014	Please Like Me		Pigeon Fancier Productions / John & Josh / International / Australian Broadcasting Corporation / Participant Media / ABC TV	Australia
2014	Late Nite News with Loyiso Gola		eNews Channel Africa	South Africa
2014	The Mayor's Wife	A Mulher do Prefeito	Rede Globo	Brazil
2015	Sweet Mother	Doce de Mãe	Rede Globo	Brazil
2015	Fais Pas Ci, Fais Pas Ca		France Télévisions / France 2	France
2015	Familia en Venta		Fox Telecolombia	Colombia
2015	Sensitive Skin		HBO Canada	Canada
2015	Puppet Nation ZA		Both Worlds / Star1	South Africa
2016	Hoff the Record		Me & You Productions	United Kingdom
2016	Call My Agent!	Dix pour cent	France Télévisions / Mon Voisin / Productions / Mother Production / Ce qui me meut / France 2	France
2016	Puppet Nation ZA		Both Worlds / Star1	South Africa
2016	Zorra		Rede Globo	Brazil
2017	Alan Partridge's Scissored Isle		KEO Films / BBC Two	United Kingdom
2017	Callboys		Woestijnvis / FBO	Belgium
2017	Rakugo The Movie	Rakugo Eiga / らくごえいが	East Entertainment / NHK	Japan
2017	Tá no Ar: a TV na TV		Rede Globo	Brazil
2018	Nebsu		Endemol Shine / Gesher' Fun / Avi Chai Fund	Israel
2018	Club de Cuervos		Alazraki Films / Netflix	Mexico
2018	Workin' Moms		Wolf + Rabbit Entertainment	Canada
2018	El fin de la comedia		Comedy Central España	Spain
2019	The Last Hangover	Especial de Natal Porta dos Fundos	Porta dos Fundos / Netflix	Brazil
2019	FAM!		Oak 3 Films Pte Ltd	Singapore
2019	Checkout!	Kupa Rashit	July August Productions	Israel
2019	Workin' Moms		Wolf+Rabbit Entertainment / CBC	Canada

=== 2020s ===
Year	English title	Original title	Production company/Network	Country
2020	Nobody's Looking	Ninguém Tá Olhando	Gullane Entretenimento / Netflix	Brazil
2020	Four More Shots Please!		Pritish Nandy Communications / Amazon Video	India
2020	Fifty		Endemol Shine Israel / Yes	Israel
2020	Back to Life		Two Brothers Pictures / BBC One	United Kingdom
2021	Call My Agent!	Dix pour cent	France Télévisions / Netflix	France
2021	Motherland: "Christmas Special"		Merman Television / Twofour / Lionsgate / BBC One	United Kingdom
2021	Promesas de Campaña		TeleColombia / Claro Video	Colombia
2021	Vir Das: For India		Weirdass Comedy / Netflix	India
2022	Sex Education		Eleven Film / Netflix	United Kingdom
2022	Dreaming Whilst Black		BBC Three / Big Deal Films	United Kingdom
2022	Búnker		HBO Latin America / WarnerMedia	Mexico
2022	On the Verge		Canal+ / The Film TV	France
2023	Derry Girls		Hat Trick Productions	United Kingdom
2023	Vir Das: Landing		Weirdass Comedy / Rotten Science	India
2023	The Boss	El encargado	Star+ / Pegsa	Argentina
2023	La Flamme	Le Flambeau	Entre 2 & 4 / Making Prod	France
2024	Community Squad	División Palermo	K&S Films / Netflix	Argentina
2024	Deadloch		Amazon MGM Studios	Australia
2024	Daily Dose of Sunshine	정신병동에도 아침이 와요 / Jungsinbyeongdong-edo achim-i wayo	Film Monster / Netflix	South Korea
2024	HPI		Itinéraire Productions / Septembre Productions / TF1 / Pictanovo / Be-Films / RTBF	France
2025	Ludwig		Big Talk Studios / That Mitchell & Webb Company	United Kingdom
2025	Chicken Nugget	닭강정 / Dakgangjeong	Studio N / Plusmedia Entertainment / Netflix	Republic of Korea
2025	Iris		Les films entre 2 et 4 / Canal+	France
2025	They Came at Night	Y llegaron de noche	3Pas / Visceral / ViX	Mexico
2026	Community Squad	División Palermo	K&S Films / Netflix	Argentina
2026	Man vs Baby		Housesitter Productions / Netflix	United Kingdom
2026	Old Dog, New Tricks	Animal	Alea / Netflix	Spain
2026	Vir Das: Fool Volume		Zazu Production Inc / Netflix	India
