= Ryuichi Sakamoto: Diaries =

2025 documentary

- Directed by: Kensho Omori
- Produced by: Nobuto Ariyoshi; Masahiro Iida; Tomoyasu Tsurumaru; The Estate of Ryuichi Sakamoto
- Production company: NHK Enterprises
- Distributed by: Happinet Phantom Studio; Comme Cinema Japon
- Release date: November 28, 2025
- Country: Japan
- Language: Japanese

Ryuichi Sakamoto: Diaries is a 2025 documentary directed by Kensho Omori about the last three and a half years of Ryuichi Sakamoto's life before his passing in March 2023. An augmented version of the NHK's Last Days: Ryuichi Sakamoto, it released in Japan on November 28, 2025.

== Background ==
=== Last Days ===
In 2024, the NHK released a special short titled Last Days: Ryuichi Sakamoto, also directed by Omori, which showed never-before-seen materials and compositions from Sakamoto's last years. Sakamoto's family had asked Omori to not make the film "too gloomy"—a note Omori took in consideration through his use of rain sounds, which Sakamoto "loved."

The special short won a Rose d'Or in 2024, as well as an International Emmy Award for Best Arts Programming and two Prix Italia awards in 2025.

=== Diaries ===
Ryuichi Sakamoto: Diaries was made as Omori's extension and continuation of Last Days: Ryuichi Sakamoto. Made over eight months with help from Sakamoto's family, it used even more footage and archival materials which follow Sakamoto's last years of life in "the places he spent it: his New York home, his hospital room, the studio where he held his final performance" and also showcases "unfinished sketches of his last works."

The film additionally makes use of Sakamoto's real diaries, which were read by Sakamoto's longtime friend, dancer, and actor Min Tanaka.
