= Valle salvaje =

Spanish television soap opera

- Genre: Soap opera; Period drama
- Created by: Josep Cister Rubio
- Country of origin: Spain
- Original language: Spanish

Production
- Production companies: RTVE; StudioCanal; Bambú Producciones

Original release
- Network: La 1
- Release: 18 September 2024 – present

Valle salvaje is a Spanish period television soap opera, created by Josep Cister Rubio. It began airing in Spain on 18 September 2024 on La 1 of Televisión Española. It is produced by Radiotelevisión Española (RTVE), StudioCanal, and Bambú Producciones.

== Premise ==
In the year 1763, Adriana Salcedo de la Cruz is a 20-year-old woman who, after attending a ball at the Royal Palace, is forced to leave the town of Madrid and travel with her siblings to Asturias to fulfill her secretly arranged marriage commitment. She must meet her fiancé, Julio, a man she does not know, and stay at her aunt Doña Victoria's house, her late father's sister. There, her life will change forever. She will encounter true love, betrayal, and put her life at risk as she tries to uncover the truth about her father's death.

== Cast ==
- Rocío Suárez de Puga as Adriana Salcedo de la Cruz
- Manuela Velasco as Pilara
- José Manuel Seda as José Luis Gálvez de Aguirre
- Marco Pernas as Rafael Gálvez de Aguirre
- Sabela Arán as Victoria Salcedo de la Cruz
- Mari Paz Sayago as Isabel
- Nacho Olaizola as Julio Gálvez de Aguirre

== Production ==
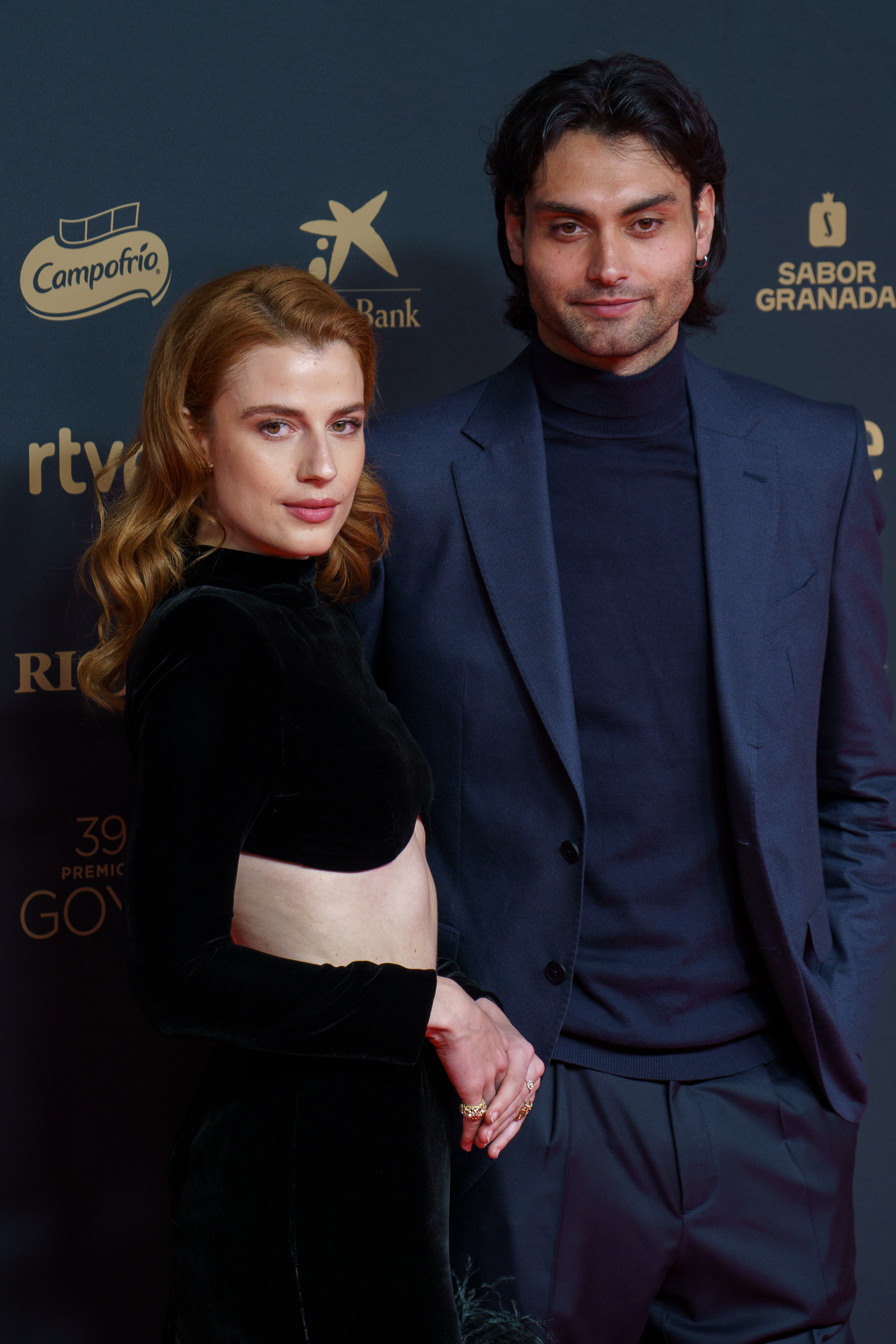
Rocío Suárez de Puga and Marco Pernas in 2025

In November 2023, it was first announced that Radiotelevisión Española (RTVE) had commissioned Bambú Producciones to produce a new daily series, Valle salvaje, which would consist of 120 episodes and have a total budget of €11.1 million.

Filming for the series began on 8 April 2024, and took place in the municipality of Cerezo de Arriba (Segovia), as well as in several historical locations such as the Royal Palace of La Granja de San Ildefonso, the Palace of Hoyuelos, and Las Tabladillas in Segovia; the Royal Palace of Aranjuez in Aranjuez (Madrid); the Granjilla Estate in San Lorenzo de El Escorial; the Casa de las Cadenas in Toledo; the exteriors of the city of Aranjuez; and the Tejo Reservoir.

== Episodes ==
Season	Episodes	Originally released		Avg. viewers (millions)	Avg. share
Season	Episodes	First released	Last released	Avg. viewers (millions)	Avg. share
1	120	18 September 2024	19 March 2025	0.597	7.5%
2	120	20 March 2025	26 August 2025	0.754	9.3%
3	180	27 August 2025	TBA	TBA	TBA

== Release ==
In August 2024, Televisión Española began promoting Valle salvaje on La 1. Although it was initially rumored that it would replace 4 estrellas in the access prime time slot, the network soon revealed that it would air in the afternoons, replacing one of the two versions of the game show El cazador. On 2 September 2024, Netflix announced that it had acquired the series to launch it daily on its platform in all Spanish-speaking countries.

On 13 September 2024, La 1 announced that it would premiere Valle salvaje in prime time on 18 September 2024, taking the slot originally intended for the premiere of Las abogadas, before moving to the afternoons of the network starting Thursday, 19 September 2024. The next day, on 14 September 2024, the network confirmed that the afternoon airing of the series would take place at 6:30 PM, after La Moderna and La Promesa, replacing El cazador Stars.

== Accolades ==
=== Awards and nominations ===
Year	Award	Category	Result	R.
2025	53rd International Emmy Awards	Best Telenovela	Nominated	
2025	64th Rose d'Or Awards	Best Soap or Telenovela	Nominated	
2026	54th International Emmy Awards	Best Telenovela	Nominated	
