= Alexander Nanau =

Romanian film director

- Born: 18 May 1979 (age 46); Bucharest, Romania
- Occupations: Film director, film producer, screenwriter

Alexander Nanau (born 18 May 1979) is an Oscar-nominated German/Romanian film director, film producer and screenwriter.

== Biography ==
Alexander Nanau was born on 18 May 1979, in Bucharest, Romania. He has lived in Germany since 1990.

Nanau studied directing at the German Academy of Film and Television in Berlin (DFFB) and was the holder of two scholarships, one at the Sundance Institute, and another at the Akademie der Künste in Berlin.

== Career ==
In 2007, he founded the Alexander Nanau Production production house in Romania. His documentary, The World According to Ion B., won the 2010 International Emmy Award in the "Arts Programming" category.

His documentary Toto and His Sisters was nominated for the European Film Awards of the European Film Academy in 2015. The latter was distributed internationally and shown at festivals around the world. Nanau was the cinematographer for the French-German documentary Nothingwood, filmed in Afghanistan, which premiered at Cannes in 2017 in the Directors' Fortnight section.

His documentary Collective won the Best Documentary category at the 2020 European Film Awards. It became the first Romanian film nominated for the Academy Award for Best International Feature Film, as well as a nomination for Best Documentary.

== Filmography ==
Year	Film	Director	Producer	Cinematographer	Editor	Notes
2006	Peter Zadek inszeniert Peer Gynt	Yes	Yes	Yes	Yes	
2009	The World According to Ion B.	Yes	Executive	Yes	No	
2014	Toto and His Sisters	Yes	Yes	Yes	Yes	
2017	Nothingwood	No	No	Yes	No	
2019	Collective	Yes	Yes	Yes	Yes	
2022	Klarsfeld	No	Executive	No	No	
