= Lisa Seidman =

American television writer (born 1957)

- Born: April 27, 1957 (age 69); Massapequa, New York, US
- Education: Franklin & Marshall College
- Occupation: Television screenwriter
- Years active: 1984–present
- Website: https://lisaseidman.wordpress.com/

Lisa Seidman (born April 27, 1957, in Massapequa, New York) is an American television writer.

== Life and career ==
Seidman born in Massapequa, New York and graduated from the Franklin & Marshall College in 1979. In 1980s, she bagan writing for prime time television series such as Murder, She Wrote, Cagney & Lacey, and Scarecrow and Mrs. King. Seidman has written episodes for several prime time television drama series, which include CBS's Dallas, for which she wrote thirteen episodes, Falcon Crest and Knots Landing, for which she wrote 7 episodes. In 1997 she also wrote the miniseries Knots Landing: Back to the Cul-de-Sac. Also in 1997, she began writing for the NBC daytime soap opera, Sunset Beach for three years.

From 2003 to 2008, Seidman lived and worked in Moscow, creating and head writing soaps for Russian television. Her 2003 prime time serial Poor Nastya, set in 19th century imperial Russia, achieved international success and was shown in more than 34 countries worldwide. Her next series was another period soap Talisman of Love and the Russian adaptation of Yo soy Betty, la fea. After a year writing for ABC soap One Life to Live in 2007, she returned to Moscow as the head writer of One Night of Love, which was nominated for an International Emmy Award.

From 2008 to 2014, Seidman worked on The Young and the Restless. From 2020 to 2023 she worked on General Hospital, and from 2008 to 2011, 2015 to 2016 and as of 2025 on Days of Our Lives. She also has been nominated numerous times for awards for her screenwriting work on daytime television, twice winning in both 2012 for her work on the NBC-TV soap series Days of Our Lives and in 2014 for her work on The Young and the Restless.

== Selected filmography ==
- Cagney & Lacey: Writer (1984)
- Dallas: Writer/Executive Story Consultant (1990–1991)
- Dangerous Curves: Writer (1992)
- Days of Our Lives: Script Writer (January 10, 2003 – February 21, 2003); Associate Head Writer (December 9, 2008 – August 31, 2011); Breakdown writer (August 19, 2015 – September 2, 2016)
- Falcon Crest Writer/Story Editor (1987–1988)
- General Hospital: Script Writer (January 14, 2020 – present)
- Guiding Light: Script Writer (2002–2003)
- Knots Landing: Head Writer (January 1992 – May 13, 1993)
- Knots Landing: Back To The Cul-De-Sac Co-Writer (1997)
- Murder, She Wrote: Writer (1994)
- One Life to Live: Script Writer (September 27, 2006 – May 18, 2007)
- Scarecrow and Mrs. King: Writer (1985)
- Silk Stalkings: Writer (1996)
- Sunset Beach: Breakdown Writer (1999 – December 31, 1999); Script Writer (January 6, 1997 – 1998)
- The Young and the Restless: Breakdown Writer (October 18, 2012 – November 9, 2012, January 26, 2017 – January 18, 2018); Writer (July 7, 2008 – October 2008), Associate Head Writer (November 12, 2012 – December 16, 2014)

== Awards and nominations ==
Daytime Emmy Awards

- 2024 – Won - Daytime Emmy Outstanding Writing for a Drama Series, for General Hospital
- 2018 – Nominated - Daytime Emmy Outstanding Writing for a Drama Series, for The Young and the Restless
- 2015 – Nominated - Daytime Emmy Outstanding Writing for a Drama Series, for The Young and the Restless
- 2014 – Won - Daytime Emmy Outstanding Writing for a Drama Series, for The Young and the Restless
- 2012 – Won - Outstanding Drama Series Writing Team, for Days of Our Lives
- 2003 – Nominated - Best Writing; for Guiding Light)

Writers Guild of America Award

- 2002 – Nominated - Daytime Serials, for Guiding Light
- 1997 – Won – Daytime Serials, for Sunset Beach
- 1998 – Nominated - (TV) Daytime Serials for Sunset Beach
- 2003 – Nominated - (TV) Daytime Serials for Guiding Light
- 2014 – Nominated - (TV) Daytime Serials for The Young and The Restless
