= 37th International Emmy Awards =

2009 awards ceremony

- Promotional poster
- Date: November 23, 2009
- Location: New York Hilton Hotel; New York City, New York, U.S.
- Hosted by: Graham Norton

Highlights
- Founders Award: Sir David Frost

The 37th International Emmy Awards took place on November 23, 2009, in New York City was hosted by British television star Graham Norton. The award ceremony, presented by the International Academy of Television Arts and Sciences (IATAS), honors all TV programming produced and originally aired outside the United States.

== Ceremony ==
Nominations for the 37th International Emmy Awards were announced by International Academy of Television Arts and Sciences on October 5, 2009, at a press conference in Mipcom, in Cannes. The United Kingdom leads with 9 nominations, followed by Brazil (5), Germany, Mexico and the Philippines (3). There are 41 nominees in 10 categories.

In addition to the presentation of the International Emmys for programming, the International Academy presented two special awards. Sir David Frost, received the 2009 Founders Award and Markus Schächter, Director General of Germany's ZDF, received the Directorate Award for his outstanding leadership of ZDF and to commemorate the 60th Anniversary of the founding of The Federal Republic of Germany.

=== Presenters ===
The following individuals, listed in order of appearance, presented awards.

Name(s)	Role
Graham Norton	Host from 37th annual International Emmy Awards
Paula Zahn	Presenter of the award for Arts Programming
Stephanie March; Matt Bomer	Presenters of the award for Best Actor
Edie Falco; Paul Schulze	Presenters of the award for Best Actress
Alexa Chung; Matthew Rhys	Presenters of the award for Best Comedy Series
Moby	Presenter of the award for Best Documentary
Ed Westwick	Presenter of the award for Best Drama Series
Juliana Paes; Rachel Roy	Presenters of the award for Best Non-Scripted Entertainment
Keke Palmer	Presenter of the award for Children & Young People Series
Katharine McPhee	Presenter of the award for Best Telenovela
Robert Joy; Mar Saura	Presenters of the award for Best TV movie or Mini-Series
Barbara Walters	Presenter of the award for Emmy Founders Award
Henry Kissinger	Presenter of the award for Emmy Directorate Award

== Winners and nominees ==
Best Telenovela	Best Drama Series
India: A Love Story (Brazil) (Rede Globo); Magdusa Ka (Philippines) (GMA Network); Seconde Chance (France) (TF1); Kahit Isang Saglit (Philippines) (ABS-CBN)	The Protectors (Denmark) (ZDF/NRK/SVT); Capadocia (Mexico) (HBO Latin America); The Kingdom of the Winds (South Korea) (KBS); Sokhulu and Partners (South Africa) (Paw Paw Films); Spooks (United Kingdom) (BBC)
Best TV Movie or Miniseries	Best Arts Programming
The Wolves of Berlin (Germany) (ZDF); Maysa - When the heart sings (Brazil) (Rede Globo); Ultimate Rescue (China) (CCTV-6); The Shooting of Thomas Hurndall (United Kingdom) (Channel 4)	The Mona Lisa Curse (United Kingdom) (Channel 4); Por Toda Minha Vida: Mamonas Assasinas (Brazil) (Rede Globo); Ode to Joy: 10,000 Voices Resound (Japan) (MBS); Seven Gates of Jerusalem (Poland) (Telewizja Polska)
Best Comedy Series	Best Documentary
Hoshi Shinichi's Short Shorts (Japan) (NHK); Peter Kay's Britain's Got the Pop Factor (United Kingdom) (Channel 4); Ó Paí, Ó (Brazil) (Rede Globo); Turkish for Beginners (Germany) (ARD-Werbung/GmbH)	The Ascent of Money (United Kingdom) (Channel 4); Pancho Villa: Aqui y Alli (Argentina) (History en Español/History Channel); Shooting the messenger (Qatar) (Al Jazeera); Cityboy: The Life of Investment Banker Geraint Anderson (Germany) (WRD)
Best Actor	Best Actress
Ben Whishaw in Criminal Justice (United Kingdom) (BBC); Robert de Hoog in Skin (Netherlands) (Humanistische Omroep); Li Chen in Ultimate Rescue (China) (CCTV-6); Oscar Olivares in Capadocia (Mexico) (HBO Latin America)	Julie Walters in A Short Stay in Switzerland (United Kingdom) (BBC); Emma de Caunes in Night Birds (France) (Chez Wam); Angel Locsin in Lobo (Philippines) (ABS-CBN); Cecilia Suárez in Capadocia (Mexico) (HBO Latin America)
Best Non-Scripted Entertainment	Best Children & Young People Program
The Phone (Netherlands) (Park Lane TV); The Amazing Race Asia 3 (Singapore) (SPE Networks/ABC Studios/ActiveTV Asia); I'm a Celebrity...Get Me Out of Here! (United Kingdom) (ITV); Historia extrema (Argentina) (History Channel Latin America)	Dustbin Baby (United Kingdom) (BBC); Lharn Poo Koo E-Joo (Thailand) (Channel 7); The Little Emperor's Christmas (Brazil) (Rede Globo); Mille (Denmark) (DR)

== Most major nominations ==
By country

- United Kingdom — 9
- Brazil — 5

By network

- Rede Globo — 5
- BBC — 4
- Channel 4 — 4

== Most major awards ==
By country

- United Kingdom — 5

By network

- BBC — 3
- Channel 4 — 2
