= 36th International Emmy Awards =

2008 awards ceremony

- Date: November 24, 2008
- Location: New York Hilton Midtown; New York City
- Hosted by: Roger Bart

Highlights
- Founders Award: Dick Wolf

The 36th International Emmy Awards took place on November 24, 2008, at the New York Hilton Midtown in New York City and hosted by American actor Roger Bart. The award ceremony, presented by the International Academy of Television Arts and Sciences (IATAS), honors all TV programming produced and originally aired outside the United States.

== Ceremony ==
The nominees for the 36th International Emmys were announced by the International Academy of Television Arts and Sciences (IATAS) on October 13, 2008 at a press conference at MIPCOM in Cannes, France. In all, 40 TV shows from 16 countries competed for the award in ten categories. The United Kingdom topped the list with eight nominations, followed by Brazil with six, Argentina and Japan with four, China and Denmark with three, Jordan and Peru with one nomination. The nominees were selected over six months by a panel of 600 judges representing around 50 countries.

The United Kingdom led the list with eight nominations, followed by Brazil with six, Argentina and Japan with four, China and Denmark with three, Jordan and Peru with one nomination. The nominees were selected over six months by a panel of 600 judges representing around 50 countries. This year, the International Academy awarded a telenovela for the first time, with the introduction of a new category, contested by The Invasion Igtiyah (Jordan), Lalola (Argentina), One Night of Love (Russia) and Paraíso Tropical (Brazil).

In addition to the presentation of the International Emmy Awards for programming, the Academy presented two special awards. The Founders Award was presented to Dick Wolf, (creator and executive producer of Law & Order) for his creative accomplishments over the last 25 years and for his international success with Law & Order. The Directorate Award was presented to Phoenix Satellite Television founder and chairman, Liu Changle, for growing Phoenix into a multimedia empire broadcasting in Mandarin in over 150 countries.

=== Presenters ===
The following individuals, listed in order of appearance, presented awards.

Name(s)	Role
Roger Bart	Host from 36th annual International Emmy Awards
Kerry O'Malley	Presenter of the award for Arts Programming
Judith Light	Presenter of the award for Best Actor
Lance Reddick	Presenter of the award for Best Actress
John Waters	Presenter of the award for Best Comedy Series
Andrea Roth	Presenter of the award for Best Documentary
Kelly Rutherford	Presenters of the award for Best Drama Series
Marcus Schenkenberg; Malu Mader	Presenters of the award for Best Non-Scripted Entertainment
Heather Tom	Presenter of the award for Children & Young People Series
Willie Garson; Cecilia Suárez	Presenters of the award for Best Telenovela
Paul Blackthorne	Presenter of the award for Best TV movie or Mini-Series
Dann Florek; Sam Waterston; Tamara Tunie; Michaela McManus; Linus Roache	Presenters of the award for Emmy Founders Award
Elaine Chao	Presenter of the award for Emmy Directorate Award

== Winners ==
Best Telenovela	Best Drama Series
The Invasion Igtiyah (Jordan) (Arab Telemedia Group); Lalola (Argentina) (América TV); One Night of Love (Russia) (AMEDIA/Sony Pictures Television); Tropical Paradise (Brazil) (Rede Globo)	Life on Mars (United Kingdom) (BBC); Home Affairs (South Africa) (Penguin Films); The Killing (Denmark) (DR/ZDF/NRK/SVT); Mandrake (Brazil) (HBO Latin America)
Best TV Movie or Miniseries	Best Arts Programming
Televisión por la identidad (Argentina) (Telefe); Britz (United Kingdom) (Channel 4); The Miracle of Berlin (Germany) (ZDF); Wait for the Birth of the Husband (China) (CCTV-6)	Strictly Bolshoi (United Kingdom) (Channel 4); Nara Leão: All My Life (Brazil) (Rede Globo); Richard Serra: To See Is to Think (Germany) (ZDF/WDR); Inheriting a Kabuki Legacy - Ichikawa Ebizo: His Fate and Anguish (Japan) (Fuji TV)
Best Comedy Series	Best Documentary
The IT Crowd (United Kingdom) (Channel 4); Geile Zeit (Germany) (GmbH); Mi problema con las mujeres (Peru) (Frecuencia Latina); NEO-Office Chuckles (Japan) (NHK)	The Beckoning Silence (United Kingdom) (Channel 4); Asian Corridor in Heaven (South Korea) (KBS); Colisão sobre a Amazônia (Brazil) (Discovery Channel/US Hispanic); Please Vote for Me (Denmark) (Steps International)
Best Actor	Best Actress
David Suchet in Maxwell (United Kingdom) (BBC); Pedro Cardoso in The Big Family (Brazil) (Rede Globo); Karl Markovics in Franz Fuchs - Ein Patriot (Austria) (ORF); Wang Chengyang in The I-Go king and his son (China) (CCTV-6)	Lucy Cohu in Forgiven (United Kingdom) (Channel 4); Sofie Gråbøl in The Killing (Denmark) (DR); Irene Ravache in Eterna Magia (Brazil) (Rede Globo); Zhibo Yuan in Wait for the Birth of the Husband (China) (CCTV-6)
Best Non-Scripted Entertainment	Best Children & Young People Program
The Big Donor Show (Netherlands) (BNN); Whoever May Fall (Argentina) (Eyeworks); The Next Great Prime Minister (Canada) (CBC TV); Doors (Japan) (TBS)	Shaun the Sheep (United Kingdom) (BBC); I Feel the Words (Japan) (NHK); Patito Feo: la historia más linda (Argentina) (Ideas del Sur); Ping-Pong (Norway) (NRK/SVT/DR/Yle/KRO)

== Most major nominations ==
By country

- United Kingdom — 8
- Brazil — 6

By network

- Channel 4 — 5
- Rede Globo — 4

== Most major awards ==
By country

- United Kingdom — 7

By network

- Channel 4 — 4
- BBC — 3
