= Mom and the Red Bean Cake =

2010 film by Yoo Hae-jin

- Hangul: 풀빵엄마
- RR: Pulppang eomma
- MR: P'ulppang ŏmma
- Written by: Noh Kyung-hee
- Directed by: Yoo Hae-jin
- Starring: Choi Jeong-mi; Choi Eun-seo; Choi Hong-hyeon
- Country of origin: South Korea
- Original language: Korean

Production
- Running time: 60 minutes

Original release
- Release: 2010

Mom and the Red Bean Cake (Korean: 풀빵엄마) is a 2010 South Korean documentary about a single mother with stomach cancer who supports her family by selling cakes, directed by Yoo Hae-jin. It was produced by MBC, and honored at the 38th International Emmy Awards.

== Background ==
The story was first shared through an episode of a south korean documentary show called "Human documentary: love" on May 8th, 2009 that aired in the south korean tv station mbc. The episode aired on May 8th as a celebration of Parents' Day in south korea. The episode reached a 12.6% in its viewership rate. The studio also received 70 calls from viewers asking the station if they can open an account to fund the family featured in the show. Because of the show's impact, the station considered a sequel to the episode, but the mom who was the topic of the episode died of her stomach cancer on July 30th 2009. After she died the kids were handled by her older sister.The episode also reaired during the christmas season that year and had the highest viewership compared to other shows that were airing when the episode was reairing.
