= Por Toda Minha Vida =

- Written by: George Moura
- Directed by: Ricardo Waddington
- Presented by: Fernanda Lima
- Country of origin: Brazil
- Original language: Portuguese
- No. of episodes: 15

Production
- Production company: Rede Globo

Original release
- Network: Rede Globo
- Release: 28 December 2006 – 1 April 2011

Por Toda Minha Vida (English: All My Life) is a Brazilian television series produced and broadcast by Rede Globo. His first episode aired on December 28, 2006. It is the Brazilian television series with the most nominations (6 in total) to the Emmy Award.

== Episodes ==
Episode	Date
Elis Regina	28 December 2006
Leandro	22 June 2007
Renato Russo	14 September 2007
Nara Leão	26 October 2007
Tim Maia	14 December 2007
Mamonas Assassinas	10 July 2008
Dolores Duran	17 July 2008
Chacrinha	24 July 2008
Cazuza	19 November 2009
Claudinho	26 November 2009
Raul Seixas	3 December 2009
Adoniran Barbosa	8 October 2010
RPM	4 November 2010
Cartola	11 March 2011
As Frenéticas	1 April 2011

== Cast ==
=== Elis Regina ===
- Hermila Guedes - Elis Regina
- Bianca Comparato - Elis Regina (teenager)
- Thavyne Ferrari - Elis Regina (child)
- Dan Stulbach - Luís Carlos Miele
- Eriberto Leão - César Camargo Mariano
- Alexandre Schumacher - Ronaldo Bôscoli
- Paulo Gustavo - Ary Barroso
- Bem Gil - Gilberto Gil
- Jéssica Marina - Lourdinha
- Cássio Scapin - Ary Rego
- Blota Filho - Paulo Machado de Carvalho Filho
- Ana Roberta Gualda - Celina Silva
- Frederico Eça - Milton Nascimento
- Maria Clara Guim

=== Leandro ===
- Thommy Schiavo - Leandro
- Eduardo Di Tarso - Leonardo
- Geraldo Peninha - Avelino da Costa
- Eliene Narducci - Dona Carmem
- Camila Capucci - Anália Maria de Souza
- Ana Lima - Amália
- Gilberto Miranda - Jovelino
- André Luiz Frambach - Leandro (child)
- Hugo Lacerda - Leonardo (child)
- Adassa Martins - Fátima Costa
- Cássia Gentile - Ede Cury
- Alexandre Mofati
- Carlos André Faria
- Cássio Pandolfi
- Charles Rodrigues
- Chico Sant'Anna
- Christina Dantas
- Fernando Paganote
- Giselli Cohen
- Junior Prata
- Jonas Gadelha
- Julia Sabugosa
- Ricardo Brant
- Verônica Rocha
- Wanda Grandi

=== Renato Russo ===
- Bruce Gomlevsky - Renato Russo
- Vinicius Rodrigues - Renato Russo (teenager)
- Ricardo Gadelha - Dado Villa-Lobos
- Rafael Rocha - Marcelo Bonfá
- Alex Brasil - Renato Rocha
- Pedro Struchiner - Fê Lemos
- Bruno Autran - Flávio Lemos
- Pierre Baitelli - André Pretorius
- Amilton Monteiro - Renato Manfredini
- Vânia de Brito - Maria do Carmo Manfredini
- Thalita Ribeiro - fan
- Antônio Carlos Feio
- Cristelli
- Diego Riques
- Fábio Felipe
- Jayme Berenguer
- João Nunes
- Karol di Nassif
- Lana Gulero
- Liv Izar
- Miguel Lunardi
- Nina Morena
- Remo Trajano
- Romulo Zanotto
- Saulo Acoverde
- Sávio Moll
- Teo Baross

=== Nara Leão ===
- Inez Viegas - Nara Leão
- Pérola Faria - Nara Leão (teenager)
- Rafael Magaldi - Roberto Menescal
- Leonardo Netto - Miguel Bacelar
- Rafael Fernnades - Ronaldo Bôscoli
- Rafael Raposo - Cacá Diegues
- Jorge Maia - João do Vale
- Jorge Lucas - Zé Ketti
- Branca Messina - Silvinha Telles
- André Engracia - Chico Buarque
- Rômulo Estrela - Carlinhos Lyra
- Maurício Silva - Patrício Teixeira
- Marcela Moura - Altina
- Junyor Prata - Jairo Leão
- Pablo Falcão - João Gilberto
- Daniela Guaraná - Yara
- Gabriella Chafin - Helena Floresta (young)
- Thiare Amaral - Helena Floresta
- André Delucca
- Carla Pompilio
- Cláudia Borione
- Cláudio Galvan
- Denise Negra
- Marina D'Elia
- Mauro José
- Ronald Santos
- Sérgio Zoroastro
- Thaire Maia

=== Tim Maia ===
- Charles Maia - Tim Maia (adult)
- Robson Nunes - Tim Maia (teenager)
- Bruno Arguilhes Fisher - Tim Maia (child)
- Marcelo Flores - Michael Sullivan
- Gláucio Gomes - Roberto Talma
- Aline Borges - Janete
- Renato Reston - Roberto Carlos
- Wanessa Morgado - Nice
- André Pimentel - Jairo Pires
- Luci Pereira - Maria Imaculada
- Adolpho Passinato - Jorge Ben
- Alberto França - José Roberto
- Alexandro Camara - Arlenio Lívio
- Antonio dos Santos - Edson Trindade
- Aroldo Macedo - Wellington
- Bruno Arguilles - Tim Maia
- Bruno Bebiano
- Cássio Nascimento
- Christovam Netto
- Deiwis Jamaica
- Dério Chagas
- Ely Vigortega
- Erika Berg
- Evandro Melo
- João Cunha
- Jorge Crespo
- José Leal
- Luciano Pullig
- Luiz Nicolau
- Luiz Ramalho
- Marize Mota
- Potiguara Novazzi
- Raquel Dutra
- Samantha Brandão

=== Mamonas Assassinas ===
- Fabrízio Teixeira - Dinho
- Flávio Pardal - Júlio Rasec
- Anderson Lau - Bento Hinoto
- Douglas Rosa - Samuel Reoli
- Rômulo Estrela - Sérgio Reoli
- Fernanda de Freitas - Valéria Zopello
- Diogo Novaes - Rafael Ramos
- Antônio Fragoso - João Augusto
- Graziella Schmitt - Mina
- Humberto Carrão - Rafael
- Tuini Bitencourt - Sueli de Oliveir
- Lolita Nagano - Dona Toshiko
- Rose Germano - Nena dos Reis de Oliveira
- Elder Gatelly - Nelson Lima
- Gabriel Azevedo - Joni Anglister
- Vanessa Monteiro - Grace Kellen
- Cláudia Tisato - Célia
- Robert Guimarães - Rick Bonadio
- Carlos Vieira - Joni Anglister
- Alcemar Vieira - Ito Reis de Oliveira
- Paulo Ascenção - Hildebrando Leite
- Alex Gomes - Dinho's friend
- Ivo Muller - Márcio
- Leonardo Oda - Maurício
- Aury Porto - Jorge
- Ronaldo Tortelly - Owner stadium Thomeuzão
- Luíz Eduardo Machado
- Fábio Florentino
- Fábio Spinardi
- Raul Labancca
- Alan Medina
- Clóvis Gonçalves

=== Dolores Duran ===
- Nanda Costa - Dolores Duran
- Vitória Pina - Dolores Duran (child)
- Rachel de Queiroz - Dolores Duran (teenager)
- Akin Garragari - Paulo Moura
- Bruno Bebianno - Alberico Campana
- Wendy Loyola - Lela
- Ridan Pires - Vinicius de Moraes
- José Mauro Brandt - Antonio Maria
- Arthur Kohl - Barão
- Cyrano Rosalém - Armindo
- Anna Cotrim - Helenita
- Izabel Lima
- João Cunha
- Paulo Gustavo
- Rosana Prazeres
- Malu Rocha
- Andrea Dantas
- Duda Mamberti
- Ana Abbott
- Bruno Stierli
- Antonio Carlos Feio
- Augusto Garcia
- Renan Monteiro
- Sérgio Guizé
- André Mendes
- Rafael Rocha
- Otávio Martins
- Ivens Godinho
- Renata di Carmo
- Vania Veiga
- Clayton Echevesti
- Elsa Pinheiro
- Antonio Entriel
- Clayton Rasga

=== Chacrinha ===
- Hélio Vernier - Chacrinha
- Alessandro Tchê - Chacrinha (young)
- Léo Oliveira - Abelardo Barbosa (child)
- Bárbara Castro - Aurélia (young)
- Prazeres Barbosa - Aurélia
- Ceceu Valença - Leleco Barbosa
- Ana Clara Gründler - Angélica (child)
- Teca Pereira - Parteira de Chacrinha
- Marcos Veras - Nanato (son)
- Cris Nicolotti - Maria Lúcia
- Russo - ele mesmo
- Sidney Magal - Himself
- Jerry Adriani - Himself
- Alessandra Diamante - Chacrete
- Carina Moraes - Chacrete
- Marcello Gonçalves - Father's Chacrinha
- Alexandra Plubins
- Tiago Robert
- Samir Murad
- Michelle Martins
- Marco Bravo
- Leonardo Thierry
- Mário José Paz
- Francisco Silva
- Kendi
- Camila Caputti
- Irene Serejo
- Kelzy Scard
- Renato Reston
- Antonio dos Santos
- Carlos Félix
- Bruna Guerin
- Pablo Uranda
- Luana Xavier
- José Antonio Gomes
- Carolina Bezerra
- Cacá Monteiro

=== Cazuza ===
- Daniel Granieri - Cazuza (from 15 to 30 years)
- Leonardo Rocha - Cazuza (from 10 to 14 years)
- Lígia Cortez - Lucinha Araújo
- Paulo Carvalho - João Araújo
- Pitty Webbo - Bebel Gilberto
- Ricardo Blat - Ezequiel Neves
- Flávio Tolezani - Ney Matogrosso
- Eduardo Pires - Dé Palmeira
- Alexandre Lemos - Roberto Frejat
- Caio Graco - Maurício Barros
- Charles Myara - Rodrigo Santos
- Fabio Gozzi - Peninha
- Felipe Lima - Fernando
- Gabriel Scheer - Dadi
- Gildo Coelho - Guto Goffi
- Gláucio Gomes - Roberto Talma
- Luciano Luppi - Vinicius de Moraes
- Ricardo Clemente
- Tiago Salomone - Pedro Bial
- Débora Bloch - Bete

=== Claudinho ===
- Alex Gomes - Claudinho
- Adriano de Jesus - Buchecha
- Cristina Fagundes - Vanessa Alves
- Carlos Seidl - Ivan Manzieli
- Élida Muniz - The girl at the ball
- Aldo Perrota - Falcão
- André Luiz Rocha - Alex Bolinha
- Carlos Alves Peixoto - DJ Malboro
- Carolina Bezerra - Rozana Souza
- Diego Batista
- Emerson Gomes
- Ewerton Nathan dos Santos
- João Antônio
- Luciano Vidigal
- Luis Octávio
- Magda Gomes
- Marcio Costa
- Marília Coelho - Natalina Souza
- Matheus de Sá - Claudinho (child)
- Matheus Moreira - Buchecha (child)
- Raphael Rodrigues
- Rhudson Lewkyan
- Ruan Ricardo Guimarães Silva
- Saulo Rodrigues - Maciel
- Thogun - Valdir
- Victor Andrade
- Wendell Passos
- Xandy Britto

=== Raul Seixas ===
- Júlio Andrade - Raul Seixas
- Pietro Sargentelli - Paulo Coelho
- Bruno Abrahão - Plínio Seixas (child)
- Rafael Almeida - Raul Seixas (to 18 years)
- Leonardo Leal - Raul Seixas (to 12 years)
- Thelmo Fernandes - musical productor
- Paulo Carvalho - doctor
- Luiz Nicolau - Raul Varella Seixas (Father's Raul)
- Aline Peixoto - Maria Eugenia Santos Seixas
- Carolina Lyrio - Elizabeth Seixas
- Charles Fricks - Marco Mazzola
- Cristiane Ferreira - Sonia Bahia (Teacher's Raul)
- Daniela Pessoa
- Douglas Rosa - Délcio Gama
- Emmanuel Pasqualini - Thildo Gama
- Gibran Lamha - Eládio Gilbraz
- Jack Berraquero - Evandro Ribeiro
- João Pedro Zappa - Jerry Adriani
- Larissa Henrique - Vivian Seixas
- Léo Oliveira - Waldir
- Linn Jardim - Edith Wisner Seixas
- Maria Laura Nogueira - Kika Seixas
- Marcio Machado - Mauro Motta
- Marco Marcondes - Sérgio Sampaio
- Mario Hermeto - Marcelo Nova
- Nicolas Bauer - Toninho Buda
- Paula Rebelo - Tania Menna Barreto
- Pedro Cavalcante - Nélson Motta
- Rachel Gutville

=== Adoniran Barbosa ===
- Hugo Nápoli - Adoniran Barbosa (elderly)
- Marcello Airoldi - Adoniran Barbosa (adult)
- Cassio Pandolfi - Ferdinando
- Ricardo Pettine - Jorge
- Fabíula Nascimento - Matilde de Lutiis
- Erlene Melo - Olga
- Glauce Graieb - Ema Rubinato
- Caike Luna - Rancinho
- Ângela Barros - Marta
- Blota Filho - Osvaldo
- Leandro Oliva - Mato Grosso
- Cláudia Borioni - Márcia
- Caio Zaccariotto - Raul Torres
- Cassio Pandolfi - Ferdinando
- Cristiana Pompeo - Matilde
- Diogo Salles - Carlinhos Vergueiro
- Elaine Babo
- Erlene Melo
- Franco Ventura - Luíz Barbosa
- Gabriela Linhares
- Gabriel Sequeira - Osvaldo Moles
- Gilberto Miranda
- Julio Adrião
- Julio Calasso
- Leandro Oliva
- Marcelo Laham - The owner of the radio
- Marco Biglia
- Ricardo Pettine - Jorge
- Rodrigo Ceva Nogueira
- Rodrigo Pessin
- Tadeu di Pietro
- Waldir Gozzi

=== RPM ===
- João Gevard - Paulo Ricardo
- Ricardo Monastero - Luiz Schiavon
- Pierre Santos - Fernando Deluqui
- Bruno Martins - Paulo Pagni
- Alexandre Mandarino - Charles Gavin
- Euler Santi - Marcelo Rubens Paiva
- Carlos Loffler - Ezequiel Neves
- Marco Audino - Ney Matogrosso
- Ricardo Von Busse - Marquinho Costa
- Luis Lobo - Franco Júnior
- Willian Vorhees - Milton Nascimento
- Eduardo Canuto
- Fábio Marcoff
- Fábio Guará
- Lucas Antunes
- Gildo Coelho - Guto Goffi

=== Cartola ===
- Wilson Rabelo - Cartola (elderly)
- Alex Brasil - Cartola (adult)
- Miguel Oliveira - Cartola (child)
- Marizilda Rosa - Dona Zica
- Maurício Gonçalves - Sebastião Joaquim de Oliveira
- Alexandre Mofati - Carlos
- André Corrêa - Élton Medeiros
- Claudio Handrey - Gradim
- Cosme da Viola - Mário Reis
- Danilo Moraes - Francisco Alves
- Olívia Araújo - Donária
- Domingos Meira - Sílvio Caldas
- Gustavo Ottoni - Sebastiao
- Helena Varvaki - Aída
- Jana Morais - Deolinda
- Jean Paul - Donga
- Jorge Caetano - Pinxinguinha
- Leonardo Netto - Joao da Baiana
- Luciano Vidigal - Zé da Zilda
- Marcelo Várzea - Heitor Villa-Lobos
- Marcio Fonseca - Alcebíades Barcellos
- Marcos França
- Michelle Valle
- Romis Ferreira
- Samuel de Assis - Paulinho da Viola
- Wilmar Amaral

=== As Frenéticas ===
- Nina Morena - Sandra Pêra
- Corina Sabbas - Dhu Moraes
- Flávia Rubim - Regina Chaves
- Lis Maia - Leiloca
- Gabrielle Lopez - Lidoka
- Denise Spíndola - Edyr Duque
- Fellipe Marques - Nelson Motta
- Marcos Audino - Ney Matogrosso
- Jean Beppe - Liminha
- Sidy Correa - Ruban Barra
- Ubiraci Miranda - Ponciano
- Márcia Di Milla - Dona Glória
- Adriano Petermann - Roberto de Carvalho
- Carlos Caff
- Ana Carolina Rosa Moura
- Catherine Beranger
- Ana Lelis
- Ana Zettel
- Alair Rodrigues

== Awards ==
Year	Award	Category	Result
2007	35th International Emmy Awards	Arts Programming	Nominated
2008	Premio Qualidade Brasil	Television: Best Musical Program	Won
2008	36th International Emmy Awards	Arts Programming	Nominated
2009	APCA Trophy	Television: Best Musical Program	Won
2009	37th International Emmy Awards	Arts Programming	Nominated
2010	38th International Emmy Awards	Arts Programming	Nominated
2011	39th International Emmy Awards	Arts Programming	Nominated
2012	40th International Emmy Awards	Arts Programming	Nominated
