= 30 vies =

- Created by: Fabienne Larouche
- Starring: Marina Orsini; Benoît McGinnis
- Country of origin: Canada
- Original language: French
- No. of seasons: 11
- No. of episodes: 660

Production
- Producer: AETIOS Production
- Running time: 22 minutes

Original release
- Network: ICI Radio-Canada Télé
- Release: January 10, 2011 – April 14, 2016

30 vies is a French-language Canadian television series directed by Fabienne Larouche, produced by Aetios Productions and broadcast between 10 January 2011 and 14 April 2016 on ICI Radio-Canada Télé, with 4 episodes per week.

== Awards ==
Year	Award	Category	Result
2013	41st International Emmy Awards	Best Telenovela	Nominated
2014	42nd International Emmy Awards	Best Telenovela	Nominated
2016	44th International Emmy Awards	Best Telenovela	Nominated
2017	45th International Emmy Awards	Best Telenovela	Nominated
