= 45th International Emmy Awards =

2017 awards ceremony

- Date: November 20, 2017
- Location: New York Hilton Midtown, New York City
- Hosted by: Maz Jobrani

Highlights
- Directorate Award: Emilio Azcárraga Jean

Television/radio coverage
- Network: TBA

The 45th International Emmy Awards took place on November 20, 2017, at the New York Hilton Midtown in New York City and was hosted by Iranian-American comedian and actor Maz Jobrani. The award ceremony, presented by the International Academy of Television Arts and Sciences (IATAS), honors all TV programming produced and originally aired outside the United States.

== Summary ==
| Country | Nominations | Wins |
|---|---|---|
| Brazil | 9 | 0 |
| United Kingdom | 6 | 4 |
| Japan | 5 | 0 |
| United States | 4 | 1 |
| France | 3 | 1 |
| Canada | 3 | 1 |
| Germany | 2 | 1 |
| Belgium | 2 | 1 |
| Turkey | 1 | 1 |
| Norway | 1 | 1 |

== Ceremony ==
Nominations for the 45th International Emmy Awards were announced on September 27, 2017, by the International Academy of Television Arts & Sciences (IATAS). There are 44 Nominees across 11 categories and 18 countries. Nominees come from: Argentina, Australia, Belgium, Brazil, Canada, Colombia, France, Germany, Japan, Mexico, the Netherlands, Norway, Philippines, South Africa, Thailand, Turkey, the United Kingdom, and the United States.

In addition to the presentation of the International Emmys for programming and performances, the International Academy presented one special award. Emilio Azcárraga Jean, chairman of the board, President and CEO of Grupo Televisa, the world's largest Spanish-language content provider and Mexico's largest broadcaster and pay television provider, received the Directorate Award.

== Winners and nominees ==
| Best Telenovela | Best Drama Series |
|---|---|
| Kara Sevda (Turkey) (Ay Yapim); 30 vies (Canada) (Aetios Productions); Total Dreamer (Brazil) (Rede Globo); Old River (Brazil) (Rede Globo) | Mammon (Norway) (NRK Drama); Above Justice (Brazil) (Rede Globo); Moribito: Guardian of the Spirit (Japan) (NHK); Wanted (Australia) (Matchbox Pictures/NBCUniversal) |
| Best TV Movie or Miniseries | Best Arts Programming |
| Do not Give Me Up (France) (Scarlett Production/France 2); Alemão (Brazil) (Rede Globo); Reg (United Kingdom) (LA Productions/BBC); Tokyo Trial (Japan) (NHK/FATT Productions/DCTV) | Hip-Hop Evolution (Canada) (Banger Films); Never-Ending Man: Hayao Miyazaki (Japan) (NHK); Portátil (Brazil) (Porta dos Fundos); Robin's Road Trip (Netherlands) (Talent United/AVROTROS/CoBO) |
| Best Comedy Series | Best Documentary |
| Alan Partridge's Scissored Isle (United Kingdom) (Baby Cow Production); Callboys (Belgium) (Woestijnvis/FBO); Tá no Ar (Brazil) (Rede Globo); The Rakugo Movie (Japan) (East Entertainment/NHK) | Exodus: Our Journey to Europe (United Kingdom) (KEO Films/BBC 2); Tempestad (Mexico) (Pimienta Films/Cactus Films/Terminal Films); Le Studio de la Terreur (France) (Capa Presse/Canal+/Creative Europe); The Phone of the Wind: Whispers to Lost Families (Japan) (NHK) |
| Best Actor | Best Actress |
| Kenneth Branagh in Wallander (United Kingdom) (BBC One); Júlio Andrade in 1 Against All (Brazil) (Fox Brazil/Conspiração Filmes); Zanjoe Marudo in Maalaala Mo Kaya (Philippines) (ABS-CBN); Kad Merad in Baron Noir (France) (Kwaï/Canal+/Pictanovo) | Anna Friel in Marcella (United Kingdom) (Buccaneer Media/Netflix); Adriana Esteves in Above Justice (Brazil) (Rede Globo); Sonja Gerhardt in Ku'damm 56 (Germany) (UFA Fiction/ZDF); Thuso Mbedu in Is'Thunzi (South Africa) (Mzansi Magic/Rapid Blue) |
| Short-Form Series | Best Non-Scripted Entertainment |
| Familie Braun (Germany) (Polyphon/ZDF); Ahi Afuera (Argentina) (Studio +/Iconoclast); The Amazing Gayl Pile (Canada) (LaRue Entertainment); Crime Time - Hora de Perigo (Brazil) (Studio +/John Doe Productions/22H22) | Sorry About That (Belgium) (VRT/WBITVP); Escuela para Maridos (Colombia) (Fox Telecolombia); Fan Pan Tae Super Fan (Thailand) (TBC/Workpoint Entertainment); Taskmaster (United Kingdom) (Avalon Television) |
Best Non-English Language U.S. Primetime Program
Sr. Ávila (United States) (HBO Latin America/Lemon Films); Hasta que te conocí (United States) (Disney Media Distribution); La Voz Kids (United States) (Telemundo); Odisea de los Niños Migrantes (United States) (NatGeo Mundo/Fox/Anima Films)
