= Dahil May Isang Ikaw =

Television series

- Title card
- Genre: Romance, Legal drama
- Written by: Mark Duane Angos; Rose Colindres; Jerome Co; Brean John De Leon
- Directed by: Jerry Lopez Sineneng; Rechie A. del Carmen
- Starring: Kristine Hermosa; Jericho Rosales; Lorna Tolentino; Gabby Concepcion; John Estrada; Chin Chin Gutierrez; Karylle; Sid Lucero
- Opening theme: "Ikaw" by Martin Nievera
- Country of origin: Philippines
- Original language: Filipino
- No. of episodes: 105

Production
- Executive producers: Carlo Katigbak; Cory Vidanes; Laurenti Dyogi; Malou Santos
- Producers: Narciso Y. Gulmatico, Jr.
- Running time: 30-45 minutes
- Production company: Star Creatives

Original release
- Network: ABS-CBN
- Release: August 24, 2009 – January 15, 2010

Dahil May Isang Ikaw (International title: Destined Hearts / transl. Because There is Only You) is a Philippine television drama series broadcast by ABS-CBN. Directed Jerry Lopez Sineneng and Rechie A. del Carmen, it stars Kristine Hermosa, Jericho Rosales, Lorna Tolentino, Gabby Concepcion, John Estrada, Chin Chin Gutierrez, Karylle and Sid Lucero. It aired on the network's Primetime Bida line up and worldwide on TFC from August 24, 2009 to January 15, 2010, replacing Only You and was replaced by Kung Tayo'y Magkakalayo.

According to ABS-CBN International Sales and Distribution, the series will soon air in Malaysia and other Asian countries with the English title of Destined Hearts. In 2010, Dahil May Isang Ikaw was nominated at the International Emmy Awards in the telenovela category, while Sid Lucero became the country's first male actor ever to be nominated in the same awards show in the acting categories for his role. The show was nominated as best foreign drama series in the Emmy Awards.

== Premiere and concept ==
The show premiered on August 24, 2009, at 09:15 PM (PST) timeslot. It was then adjusted to 08:30 PM (PST) timeslot last December 14, 2009, replacing the timeslot of Lovers In Paris. Dahil May Isang Ikaw tells the tale of two families whose fates intertwine with one another, creating a rather complicated love story between two brothers and two sisters.

== Story and development ==
Tessa Ramirez (Lorna Tolentino) is a well-respected lawyer who has won every case she took, particularly child abuse cases. However, the agony in searching for her lost daughter was her greatest fight. Before attaining success in life, she was once the partner of Jaime Alferos (Gabby Concepcion) during college in 1980. Jaime had promised Tessa that they will get married once he comes back from a six-month stay in the States for academics. One day, Jaime's mother (Alicia Alonso) told Tessa that Jaime is committed to an affair with another lady. Tessa called Jaime, but the phone call was received by Patricia Aragon (Chin-Chin Gutierrez), who confirmed the relationship. Tessa was pregnant at that time. Daniel Ramirez (John Estrada) is a friend who secretly loves her. He will do anything that will please Tessa and he stands as husband and father of the child.

In an unexpected situation, Tessa's daughter Melissa was kidnapped by a syndicate whose motives is to raise babies to be laborers. Daniel was taking baby Melissa to see her pediatrician, when he was suddenly held at gunpoint by a man demanding he hand over the baby or be killed. Tessa greatly blamed Daniel when she discovered he lost her daughter.

In an effort to make things up to Tessa, Daniel promises to put her through law school, which is her most cherished dream. To support her, he turns to a life of crime. One day while robbing a bank, his heist partner is killed after shooting a bank customer during a scuffle. The customer turns out to be a brother of a government official and, because his killer is already dead, Daniel is detained for his murder.

Ella (Mika dela Cruz, later to be Kristine Hermosa) is a girl who has simple dream, to be loved by her mother. She tried to make her dream come true by dropping a bended one peso coin to the river; it was caught by a sailing vessel instead. She saw a boy, Miguel (Paul Salas, later to be Jericho Rosales) who secretly boarded that ship. She asks him to drop the coin to the water but young Miguel didn't hear it clearly. Both of them were caught, Miguel by a fisherman forcibly asking him to get down immediately and Ella by her mother while punishing her because of stealing the peso.

Here comes young Pip (Nash Aguas, later to be Sid Lucero) who stole a lady's handbag due to starvation. Pip has been influenced by his biological father before. Young Miguel advised his half brother (not by blood) not to do it anymore.

As all struggle for their dreams' fate leads Miguel to Tessa after overhearing Ella's dream about being with her idol who is Tessa the dedicated lawyer Miguel heard in Ella's stories. Tessa decides to provide help to Miguel on getting Pip out of jail. Not only does she do this but finds it in her heart that she is close to young Miguel as if he were her child. In prison meanwhile Pip's life is hardened. Daniel decides to take in Pip so he doesn't want to be hardened by the inmates.

Pip seems to be open to Daniel, and Pip is raised with Daniel being his father figure. As Pip leaves early, Tessa decides to take in the two boys to be her own. On the other hand, Jaime takes in little Ella. Patricia and her daughter little Denise (Angel Sy, later on played by Karylle) dislike Angela, and they even make it a point to hurt Ella. Ella and Denise later on become friends. Jaime adopts Ella, but Patricia has a constant dislike to her. As Ella grows into a beautiful young woman, she becomes a successful lawyer — making it her ultimate goal to work with her idol, Tessa, and become close to her in general. She becomes ready for her next encounter with her long-lost love Miguel as the two become lawyers who unexpectedly are in the top league: Miguel is No. 1 while Ella is No. 2 in the board exams. Ella is unaware when she meets Tessa as she decides to apply for the law firm. Tessa gives her a big case after Ella initially tries to get hold of Tessa. When Tessa finds out about her last name the bell rings on her behalf and feels mortified yet shocked that her father is Jaime Alferos. Ella is dedicated on that big case.

As Daniel gets out of prison, he goes back to doing his evil deeds and so does Patricia, as both of them are scared to lose Jaime and Tessa. The predicament also goes for Denise and Pip, who is now called Alfred or "Red". They both are ready to pursue against all odds in exchange for their love.

All are struggling as the latter comes to the point that the two families are in a feud. A family torn between love, deception, and all odds.

== Cast and characters ==
=== Main cast ===
- Kristine Hermosa as Angela "Ella" Alferos-Ramirez
- Jericho Rosales as Miguel Ramirez
- Lorna Tolentino as Tessa Ramirez
- Gabby Concepcion as Jaime Alferos
- John Estrada as Daniel Ramirez
- Chin-Chin Gutierrez as Patricia Aragon-Alferos
- Karylle as Denise Mae Alferos
- Sid Lucero as Alfred "Red" Ramirez

=== Supporting cast ===
- Lauren Young as Rachel
- Arron Villaflor as Marco Aragon
- Chinggoy Alonzo as Don Fernando Aragon
- Alicia Alonzo as Donya Victoria Alferos
- Christian Vasquez as Ed Aragon
- Angel Jacob as Jill Aragon
- Maricar de Mesa as Atty. Juliana Serrano
- Kitkat as Stephanie "Stef" Miranda
- Peewee O'Hara as Yaya Pining
- Minnie Aguilar as Vanessa Javier
- Kathleen Hermosa as Charlie Sibal
- EJ Jallorina as Ploniong
- Ina Feleo as Nina
- Irene Pheobe Arevalo as Farrah
- Railey Valeroso as Paul Javier
- Josh Ivan Morales as Mario
- Cynthia Reyes as Nadia
- Val Iglesias as Wilbert
- Efren Reyes Jr. as Guido
- Tanya Gomez as Stella Cleofas Remulla
- Archie Adamos as Cong. Eduardo Javier
- Jong Cuenco as Nikos

=== Guest cast ===
- Mika dela Cruz as Young Ella
- Paul Salas as Young Miguel
- Angel Sy as Young Denise
- Nash Aguas as Young Red/Pip
- Xyriel Manabat as Nini
- Chacha Cañete as Bulilit
- Lauren Novero as Jess Garcia
- Eda Nolan as Mara Cortez
- Erika Padilla as Janelle Paez
- Zeppi Borromeo as Efren Villegas
- Joey Paras as Manolo Meloto
- Joem Bascon as Ryan Fernandez
- Cherry Lou as Patty Ancheta
- Leandro Baldemor as Mayong Ancheta
- Joyce So as Mika Tantingco
- Jazz Angela Cabaccang as Irene
- Amy Nobleza as Melissa "Kikay" dela Cruz
- Amante Pulido as Ricardo "Kadyo" dela Cruz
- Edwin Pamanian as Rafael Acuyong
- Buddy Palad as Ernesto Trinidad

== Production staff ==
- Head writer: Arah Jell Badayos
- Writers: Rose Colindres, Mark Duane Angos, Jerome Co, Amanda Beltran
- Creative director: Ricky Lee
- Creative consultant: Badong Royales

== Awards ==
=== 24th PMPC Star Awards for Television ===
Year	Nominee / work	Award	Result
2010	Dahil May Isang Ikaw	Best Primetime TV Series	Won
2010	Lorna Tolentino; Chin-Chin Gutierrez	Best Actress	Nominated
2010	John Estrada; Sid Lucero; Jericho Rosales	Best Actor	Nominated

=== 34th Annual Guillermo Mendoza Awards ===
Year	Nominee / work	Award	Result
2010	Dahil May Isang Ikaw	Most Well Liked Primetime Television Series	Nominated
2010	Dahil May Isang Ikaw	Favorite Television Series Couple	Nominated

=== International Emmy Award 2010 ===
Year	Nominee / work	Award	Result
2010	Dahil May Isang Ikaw	Best Drama Series	Nominated
2010	Sid Lucero	Best Actor	Nominated

=== ASAP Pop Viewers Choice Awards 2010 ===
Year	Nominee / work	Award	Result
2010	Dahil May Isang Ikaw	POP TV Show of The Year	Nominated

=== 2011 New York Festivals TV & Film Award ===
Year	Nominee / work	Award	Result
2011	Dahil May Isang Ikaw	Best Telenovela	Finalist

== International Broadcast ==
Country/Region
Vietnam
Malaysia
Indonesia
Singapore
Thailand
Kazakhstan
Ukraine
UAE
Colombia
Kenya
Ecuador

== See also ==
- List of shows previously aired by ABS-CBN
