= The World According to Ion B. =

Romanian documentary about then unknown artist, Ion Barladeanu

The World According to Ion B. (Romanian: Lumea văzută de Ion B.) is a 2009 HBO Romania and Alexander Nanau Production documentary film. The film was written, produced, directed, and photographed by Alexander Nanau.

The film depicts the dream of a man living on the streets: to one day become famous and leave behind a life of poverty, misery and humiliation. The title character, Ion Barladeanu, is on his way to becoming an important contemporary artist, but in May 2008 he was still anonymous and living homeless on the streets of Bucharest.

It was the first Romanian film to win an American Academy Award when it won the International Emmy Award for Best Arts Programming in 2010.
