= Robin's Road Trip =

- Written by: Simone de Vries
- Directed by: Simone de Vries
- Starring: Robin de Puy
- Country of origin: Netherlands
- Original language: Dutch

Production
- Running time: 52 minutes

Original release
- Release: 20 March 2016

Robin's Road Trip (Dutch: Robin de Puy - Ik ben het allemaal zelf, lit. 'Robin de Puy - It's All Me Myself') is a 2016 Dutch documentary film directed by Simone de Vries. It was nominated to 45th International Emmy Awards in the best arts programming category.
