= O Natal do Menino Imperador =

O Natal do Menino Imperador (The Little Emperor's Christmas) is a 2008 Portuguese language television film for children from Brazil, by Rede Globo.

It was shortlisted for an International Emmy in the Children & Young People category in 2009, but the award was won by Dustbin Baby.

== Cast ==
- Adriano Garib
- Aracy Balabanian – D. Mariana
- Carolyna Aguiar - Princesa Isabel
- Ettore Zuim
- Gilles Gwizdek
- Gláucio Gomes
- Guilherme Weber – Marquês de Itanhaém
- Guillermo Hundadze – Pedro II (child)
- Iléa Ferraz
- João Camargo – Conde de Barbacena
- João Ramos – Dito
- Júlio Levy
- Luciano Pullig
- Luís Carlos Vasconcelos – Zampano
- Marcelo Várzea – Conde D’Eu
- Oscar Ortman
- Rafael Miguel Antônio
- Reynaldo Gianecchini – D. Pedro I
- Sérgio Britto – D. Pedro II
