= The Mona Lisa Curse =

2008 documentary film

The Mona Lisa Curse is a 2008 documentary directed by Mandy Chang starring Australian art critic Robert Hughes. The film was made by Oxford Film & Television and Channel 4. It won best arts documentary at the International Emmys in 2009. It also won a Grierson Award, the Rose d'Or, and a Banff World Television Award.

== Synopsis ==
Robert Hughes argues that Mona Lisa has large influence over the art world because of its 1963 American tour, where the painting was treated like a celebrity on a publicity tour. The art was treated like a commodity. According to Hughes, this event marks the beginning of the degradation of the quality of modern art and the domination of the art market by celebrity artists and wealthy investors, which he describes as a curse. The documentary is polemical with Hughes describing artists such as Andy Warhol, Damien Hirst and Richard Prince as celebrity businessmen, and criticizing museums such as The Louvre and The Guggenheim for marketing themselves as commercial brands. For Hughes, the financialization of the art market changed art's relationship to the world and undermined its critical purpose in contemporary culture.

The film has a 75-minute run time.
