= One Night of Love (TV series) =

- Genre: Telenovela
- Written by: Lisa Sideman
- Directed by: Mikhail Mokeev; Boris Rabei
- Starring: Svetlana Ivanova; Alexander Konstantinov; Artyom Osipov
- Composers: Anton Schwarz; Sergei Grigoriev; Dmitri Chizhevskiy; Ilya Efimov; Dmitri Moss
- Country of origin: Russia
- Original language: Russian
- No. of series: 1
- No. of episodes: 60

Production
- Producers: Alexander Akopov; Alexander Rodnyansky

Original release
- Network: STS
- Release: 14 January – 16 April 2008

One Night of Love (Russian: Одна ночь любви, romanized: Odna noch lyubvi) is a 2008 Russian historical telenovela TV series. It was first developed by Amedia, with Alexander Akopov as head producer. The novela has 60 episodes. It stars Svetlana Ivanova, Alexander Konstantinov, Aleksandr Filippenko, Irina Muravyova, Olga Ostroumova, Yelena Bondarchuk, Andrey Chernyshov, Viktor Verzhbitsky. "One night of love" was nominated for International Emmy in a "Best telenovela" category. It is the original television series.

== Plot ==
Alexandra "Sasha" Zabelina (played by Svetlana Ivanova) is a young Russian aristocrat who lives on a small country estate with her father, Earl Illarion Zabelin (played by Aleksandr Filippenko). Sasha's mother was brutally killed in front of her eyes at a young age. After the tragedy she decided to become brave and strong in order to protect herself. She grew up reading stories about Nadezda Durova - woman, who dressed up like a soldier and went to war.

10 years later, Alexandra became a very beautiful young lady. She is smart, brave and kind-hearted. Her father decides to move to Saint Petersburg and Sasha joins him. When they were waiting for horse-change, Sasha heard a conversation between two men, who plan to dethrone Tsar. She finds a strange list with numbers and names and takes it with her. Strangers try to stop Alexandra, but she manages to escape. When she tells the story to her father and nanny Anna, they don't believe her.

Meanwhile, a handsome and rich knyaz (title in Russian society) Mikhail "Misha" Voronzov (played by Alexander Konstantinov) returns to Saint Petersburg from Europe. He has been absent for 2 years because of the scandal with woman. Now tse-tsarevich Alexander asks him to investigate the case about prospective plot against Tsar.

When Sasha comes to Saint Petersburg the two strangers decide to kill her. So they sent a man who should stole "the list" from her. The men threatens her with a knife. And at this moment Mikhail Voronzov saves her life. That is how Alexandra and Mikhail meet. But Sasha tells Mikhail that she could protect herself without his help.

After that Sasha decides to take fencing lessons. But the teacher Mr.Sharl do not want to teach a girl. So Alexandra dresses up like a boy in order to take this lessons.

Alexandra and Mikhail meet again in a weapon shop and argue. It is obvious that something happened between Sasha and Misha, and from there begins their love story.
