= The Other (1999 film) =

1999 film

- Film poster
- Directed by: Youssef Chahine
- Written by: Youssef Chahine; Khaled Youssef
- Produced by: Humbert Balsan; Gabriel Khoury; Marianne Khoury
- Starring: Nabila Ebeid
- Cinematography: Mohsen Nasr
- Edited by: Rashida Abdel Salam
- Music by: Yehia El Mougy
- Release date: 26 May 1999
- Running time: 105 minutes
- Countries: Egypt; France
- Language: Arabic

The Other (Arabic: الآخر, translit. El akhar, French: L'Autre) is a 1999 French-Egyptian drama film directed by Youssef Chahine. It was screened in the Un Certain Regard section at the 1999 Cannes Film Festival. Lebanese soprano Majida El Roumi sang "Adam W Hanan", an Egyptian song included in the film.

== Plot ==
Love sparks when Adam, back visiting Cairo from University of California, Los Angeles, meets Hanan, native journalist from a smaller town of Egypt in seek of a juicy story to expose the gritty truth about corruption running rampant in the country. A sappy romance between the two youth ensues, and the two quickly get married in the breathtaking deserts of Egypt. Adam's mother, Margaret, very much Americanized and obsessed with Western culture, expresses much displeasure with her son's rash decision to marry a girl such as Hanan, when it would be better to marry a wealthy Western woman, believing "money is the only thing that binds." Out of an unhealthy attachment with her son, she stalks information on Hanan based on what he told her (something she has done before), and finds that her son's newlywed is related to a terrorist in another conflict-ridden part of the Middle East. Hoping to get Adam to divorce Hanan, she tells him about her findings but it backfires, costing her his trust. Still, Hanan and Adam come to butt heads when he finds out Hanan has been trying to find dirt on the corrupted, wealthy Americans that his father has been in connection with in Cairo, and demands that she stop what she's doing. She remains firm in continuing her work, however, threatening their marriage to fall apart.

Eventually the two make up, and later Adam goes with Hanan to investigate what is happening with her exiled brother (who turns out to be the terrorist). The two get caught up in a terrorist shoot out, and die violently hand in hand.

== Cast ==
- Nabila Ebeid as Margaret
- Mahmoud Hemida as Khalil
- Hanan Tork as Hanane (as Hanane Turk)
- Hani Salama as Adam
- Lebleba as Baheyya
- Hassan Abdel Hamid as Dr. Maher
- Ezzat Abou Aouf as Dr. Essam
- Ahmed Fouad Selim as Ahmed
- Amr Saad as Omar
- Ahmed Wafik as Fathallab
- Edward Said as himself
- Hamdeen Sabahi as Chief editor
- Tamer Samir as Morcy
