= Adnan Al Awamleh =

Jordanian television producer

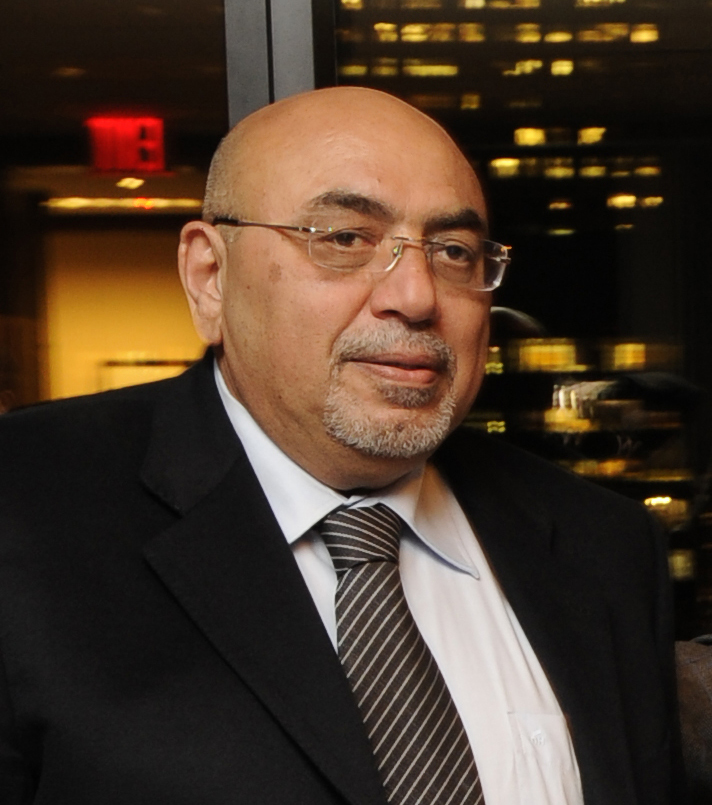
- Occupations: Producer, Founder
- Known for: Arab Telemedia Group

Adnan Al Awamleh (Arabic: عدنان العوامله), started his career with Jordan TV in 1968. After pursuing higher education at Beirut Arab University and BBC Institute, he rejoined Jordan TV as a director, working on several documentaries.

He established Arab Telemedia Group in 1983.

In 2008, Awamleh was awarded the first ever International Emmy Award for best telenovela for the dramatic series Al-Igtiyah (The Invasion).

He stepped down from running the company in 2000 and handed the leadership to his son Talal Al Awamleh.
