= Jamil Othman Nasser =

Palestinian politician (1945–2008)

- جميل عثمان ناصر

Governor of Quds Governorate
- In office January 1996 – September 2008
- Succeeded by: Adnan al-Husayni

Director General of the Ministry of Interior
- In office 1994 – January 1996

Head of the Palestinian Bar Association
- In office 1982–2008

Personal details
- Born: January 30, 1945 Jerusalem, Palestine
- Died: 22 November 2008 (aged 63)
- Party: Fatah
- Education: Beirut Arab University
- Occupation: Politician, lawyer, activist, governor

Jamil Othman Nasser (Arabic: جميل عثمان ناصر) was a Palestinian politician, leader and permanent figure.

== Early years ==
Born in the city of Jerusalem on January 30, 1945. He spent his early years in the city of Jericho in the Jordan Valley, where he received his elementary education. He graduated from school (Coptic College) in Jerusalem in 1965, and soon after left to Beirut, Lebanon, where he studied Law and graduated from the Beirut Arab University, with a degree in Law in 1970. During his university years in Beirut, he joined the Palestinian National Liberation Movement, Fatah, and upon his return to Palestine in the early 1970s, became a leading figure among its leadership in the occupied territories.

== Political and social activism ==
Nasser helped establish many institutions in the occupied Palestinian territories, upon the directions of the Palestinian leadership in exile, and was an active member of the various committees launched to coordinate between the various Palestinian factions (factions of the PLO). Nasser participated as a leading member of the "National Front" in the first free elections for the municipal councils of the cities of the West Bank held under Israeli occupation. He was elected as a municipal council member in the city of Jericho in the 1976 elections, and was later elected by the council as vice president. He was the youngest member to be elected for a municipal council in the West Bank at the age of 31. He succeeded the president in 1981 when the latter died, before being deposed by the occupation authorities in 1982 with a military order deposing the elected councils and appointing ones approved by the Israeli occupation authorities.

== 1980s ==
In 1982, he was elected as head of the Palestinian Bar Association. The Israeli response was quick, and Nasser's movement was restricted to the city boundaries of Jericho. He was not allowed to leave the city boundaries and was supposed to report to the police station twice a day, for terms extending to six months each. His final release came in 1988, at the beginning of the Palestinian Intifada, of which he soon after assumed a leading role.

== 1990s and Palestinian National Authority ==
In the early 1990s Nasser served as general secretary of the national institutions in the occupied territories (PLO and other national institutions), a position he held until the signing of the Oslo Accords in 1993, and the resulting founding of the Palestinian National Authority by the PLO. In 1994, he was appointed as the first Director General of the Ministry of Interior in the first government formed by the PNA. A position he held until January 1996, when late President Yasser Arafat, President of the Palestinian National Authority, appointed him as Governor of Jerusalem, the first governor to be appointed by the PNA and the first governor of Jerusalem since the Israeli occupation in 1967. Governor Nasser served as a governor until September 2008.

== Death ==
Governor Nasser died on the night of 22 November 2008 due to a cardiac arrest.

== See also ==
- Palestinian law
