= Awn =

AWN may stand for:

- Awn Access to Justice Network in Gaza Strip, legal aid network operating in Gaza Strip, Palestine
- Animation World Network, an online organization for animators
- Avant Window Navigator, a dock-like bar that tracks open windows

Awn may refer to:

- Awn (botany), on a plant, a hair or bristle-like appendage (i.e., an awned appendage)
- Awn hair (mammal), a type of hair on mammals
- Alton Downs Airport, IATA airport code "AWN"
