= Haifa Wehbe =

Lebanese singer and actress (born 1976)

- هيفاء وهبي
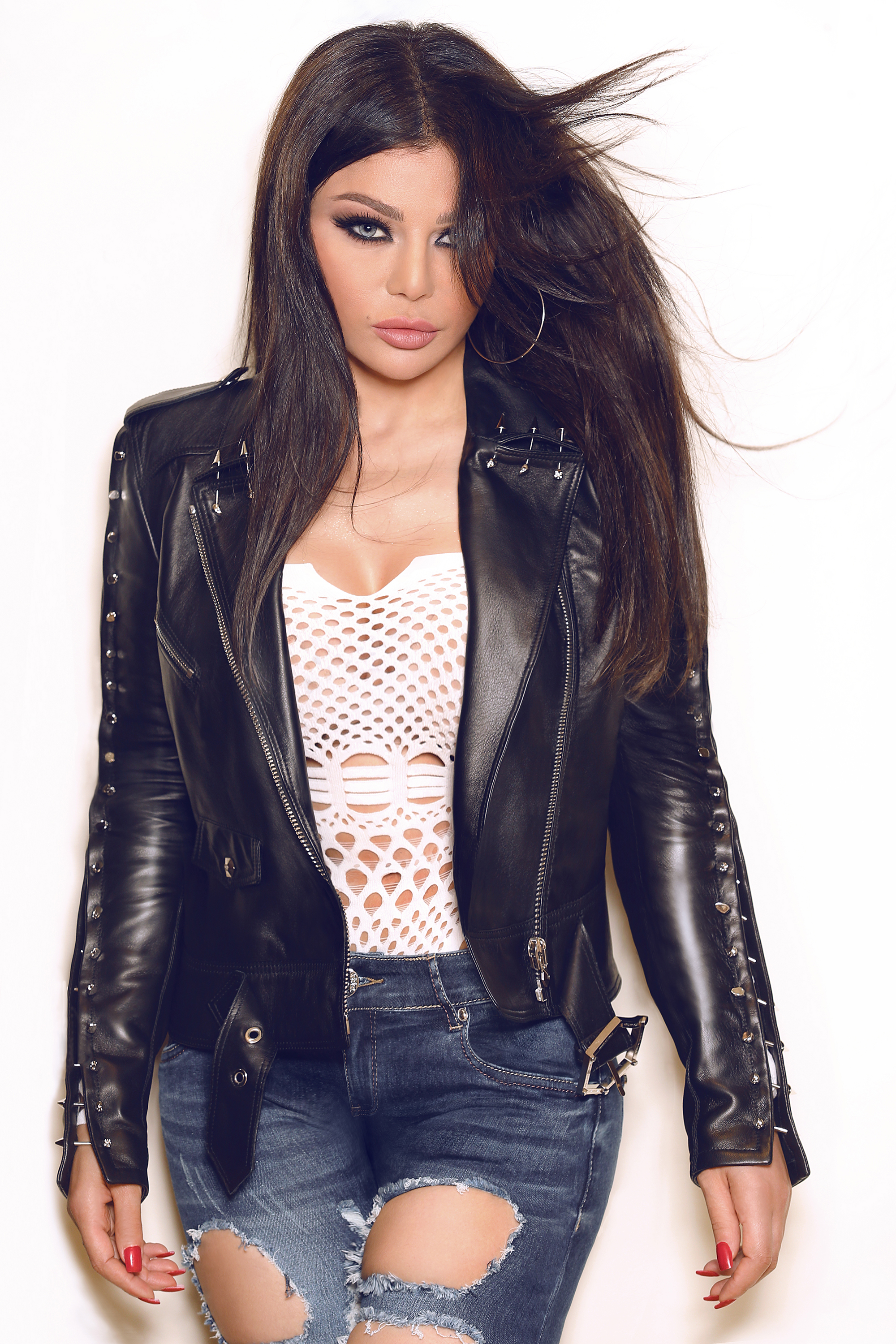
- Wehbe in 2016
- Born: Haifa Mohammed Wehbe; March 10, 1976 (age 50); Mahrounah, Tyre, Lebanon
- Citizenship: Lebanon; Egypt
- Occupations: Singer; actress; model
- Years active: 2002–present
- Spouses: Nasr Fayyad (divorced) Ahmed Abou Hashima (m. 2009; div. 2012)
- Children: 1
- Musical career
- Genres: Arabic pop music; World music
- Instrument: Vocals
- Labels: Rotana Records; Mazzika; CHBK Music

Haifa Mohammed Wehbe (Arabic: هيفاء محمد وهبي, pronounced [hæjˈfaː ˈwehbe]; born March 10, 1976) is a Lebanese singer and actress. She is considered one of Lebanon's most famous and successful singers, and one of the best-known artists in the Arab world.

She has been among the highest-selling and most successful Middle Eastern woman in the world, and has won many awards in the category of actresses, singers and performers. She has released seven studio albums, and made her acting debut in the 2008 Pepsi-produced film Sea of Stars. In 2006, Wehbe was on People Magazine's 50 most beautiful people list. She was also ranked 8th on the list of the "99 most desirable women" of 2006 by Askmen.com. Wehbe is the second richest Arab celebrity, with a reported estimated wealth of over $57 million.

In 1991, at the age of sixteen, she was chosen as Miss South Lebanon, and the holder of the title of Miss Lebanon for the year 1992, but the title was withdrawn from her because of her violation of the laws of the competition, as she was married and a mother. She began her life as a model and also participated as a model in several video clips and television commercials, then worked as a broadcaster on the Arab Radio and Television Network in 1999, and presented her first albums in 2001 and presented many albums and performed several concerts in many Arab countries. She entered the field of acting as a guest of honor in the film Bahr Al Nojoum in 2008, and in 2009 she was chosen to star in the film Dokan Shehata, which was directed by Khaled Youssef.

== Life and career ==
=== Early life ===
Haifa Wehbe was born on March 10, 1976, in Mahrouna, Tyre District, in Lebanon’s South Governorate. She is the daughter of Muhammad Wehbe, a Lebanese Shia Muslim father, and an Egyptian mother, Sayeda Abd al-Aziz Ibrahim. Although born in southern Lebanon, she was raised in the capital city, Beirut. She has three sisters and one brother.

At the age of sixteen, Wehbe won the title of Miss South Lebanon. She later competed in the Miss Lebanon pageant, where she was initially named a runner-up. However, the title was subsequently withdrawn after it was discovered that she had violated the competition’s eligibility rules, which required contestants to be unmarried and without children.

Following her early exposure through beauty pageants, Wehbe began working as a fashion model. She appeared in a number of advertising campaigns and fashion shoots, which helped establish her presence in the regional entertainment industry. During this period, she also appeared in several music videos and television commercials, further increasing her visibility across the Middle East and laying the groundwork for her later transition into music and acting.

=== Career ===
==== 2002–2007: Baddi Aech and television career ====
Wehbe entered the music industry in the early 2000s and quickly gained recognition within the Middle Eastern pop scene. Her debut studio album, Houwa El-Zaman (Arabic: هو الزمان; “It Is Time”), was released in 2002 and introduced her as a prominent emerging pop performer in the Arab music market. The album received widespread attention through its accompanying music videos and television broadcasts, which contributed to her growing popularity across the region.

In early 2005, she released her second studio album, Baddi Aech (Arabic: بدي عيش; “I Want to Live”). The album followed the success of its lead single “Ya Hayat Albi” and was released during a period of political tension in Lebanon following the assassination of former Prime Minister Rafik Hariri. The album’s title track reflected themes of freedom and resilience. Another single from the album, “Ana Haifa” (Arabic: أنا هيفاء; “I Am Haifa”), became one of her most recognizable songs and further strengthened her presence in the Arab pop industry.

During the summer of 2005, Wehbe appeared as a guest participant on Al Wadi, the Arabic adaptation of the reality television series The Farm. The program attracted significant viewership across the Arab world and generated considerable media attention. Wehbe’s participation in the series further increased her public profile and contributed to her growing recognition as a widely known entertainment figure in the region.

In 2006, she released the single “Boos al-Wawa” (Arabic: بوس الواوا), which achieved considerable regional popularity and was later featured in a regional advertising campaign for Pepsi. The song received extensive radio play and was voted “Song of the Year” in 2006 by Radio Scope and Sawt Al Musika.

==== 2008–2009: Film career beginnings and Habibi Ana ====
In early 2008, Wehbe expanded her career into film with an appearance in the Pepsi-produced musical film Sea of Stars, which brought together several prominent artists from the Arab entertainment industry, including Carole Samaha, Wael Kfoury, Brigitte Yaghi, and Ruwaida al-Mahrouqi. The project marked one of her early appearances in cinema and reflected the growing crossover between music and film within the regional entertainment industry.

Later that year, on July 4, 2008, Wehbe released her third studio album, Habibi Ana (Arabic: حبيبي أنا; “My Love”). The album featured fifteen tracks and continued to develop the contemporary Arabic pop style that characterized her earlier work, blending modern pop arrangements with traditional Middle Eastern musical elements. The lead single, “Moush Adra Estana,” received significant airplay on regional music channels and radio stations and was supported by a widely broadcast music video.

The album included collaborations with several prominent composers and lyricists in the Arab music industry and addressed themes commonly explored in contemporary Arabic pop music, including romance, personal independence, and emotional expression. Habibi Ana further reinforced Wehbe’s position within the regional pop music landscape and contributed to the continued expansion of her audience across the Middle East.

==== 2010–2012: Baby Haifa, and Malikat Jamal Al Kawn ====
In March 2010, Wehbe released a children’s album titled Baby Haifa through Rotana Records. The album represented a departure from her earlier pop-oriented releases and was aimed at younger audiences. One of its most recognized songs, “Baba Fein,” gained widespread popularity across Arabic-speaking audiences and became a frequently circulated children’s song on television and digital platforms.

In April 2010, Wehbe collaborated with French DJ and producer David Vendetta on the track “Yama Layali,” which appeared on his album Vendetta. The collaboration represented a crossover between Arabic pop and European electronic music styles.

On May 8, 2012, Wehbe released the album Malikat Jamal Al Kawn (Arabic: ملكة جمال الكون; “Miss Universe”) through Rotana Records. The album features fourteen tracks that blend contemporary Arabic pop with elements of Western and Middle Eastern musical styles and includes songs performed in Lebanese, Egyptian, and Gulf dialects. The album achieved notable commercial success and reached the number-one position on the iTunes worldwide albums chart, making Wehbe one of the first Lebanese artists to reach the top position on the platform.

==== 2013–present:Breathing You In, and Mariam ====
In 2014, she collaborated with director and producer Tarik Freitekh on the single “Farhana,” which was performed and filmed during the 2014 season of the television program Your Face Sounds Familiar (Arabic: شكلك مش غريب). The performance reflected her continued engagement with regional television entertainment platforms.

Later that year, Wehbe released the English-language single “Breathing You In,” accompanied by a music video featuring dancer and choreographer Casper Smart. The project marked one of her efforts to incorporate English-language material and international collaborations into her work.

In 2018, Wehbe expanded her acting career by starring in the Egyptian television drama Lanaat Karma. The series marked her return to television drama and broadened her presence within the Egyptian entertainment industry.

In September 2018, she released her seventh studio album, Hawwa (Arabic: حوا). The album contains fifteen tracks and was produced independently by Wehbe. Following its release, Hawwa reached the number-one position on the iTunes charts in several markets and received significant digital streaming activity across the Middle East.

In 2021, Wehbe released the duet single “Law Kont” with Egyptian actor and singer Akram Hosny. The song achieved significant digital viewership shortly after its release and ranked among the most widely viewed Arabic music videos on YouTube during its debut period.

== Personal life ==
In the early 1990s, Wehbe married Nasr Fayyad and later traveled with him to Nigeria, where he was working at the time. During her pregnancy, she returned to Lebanon and later separated from him. The couple have one daughter.

On April 24, 2009, Wehbe married Egyptian businessman Ahmed Abou Hashima in Beirut. The wedding was attended by several figures from the international and Arab entertainment industries. The couple separated in 2012.

=== Music video filming accident ===
On June 25, 2007, Wehbe was involved in an accident while filming the music video for the song "Hasa Ma Bena" at Rayak Air Base in the Beqaa Valley, Lebanon. During filming, a single-engine aircraft participating in the scene struck the convertible vehicle she was driving, with the aircraft's wing hitting the vehicle and damaging the windshield. Jet fuel (kerosene) spilled over her head and face, while broken glass covered her body. She sustained only minor injuries, including a small head wound and neck strain.

=== Residence damage during the Beirut port explosion ===
During the Beirut port explosion on 4 August 2020, Wehbe's residence in central Beirut, Lebanon, was damaged, with its glass façade shattered by the blast. At the time of the explosion, she was filming the television series Aswad Fateh and was away from the residence. Several Filipino domestic workers at the home were injured by falling glass and were taken to hospital.

== Image ==
Wehbe has been widely recognized for her public image, stage presence, and influence within the Arab entertainment industry. Her visual style and fashion choices have contributed significantly to her popularity and helped establish her as one of the most recognizable female pop figures in the Middle East.

In 2006, she was ranked eighth on the annual list of the “Top 99 Most Desirable Women” compiled by the website AskMen.com. She has frequently been cited in regional and international media as a prominent beauty icon, known for her distinctive style, glamorous stage performances, and influence on contemporary Arab pop culture.

Her performances and fashion choices have occasionally generated public discussion in more socially conservative parts of the Arab world, reflecting broader cultural debates about popular entertainment and artistic expression in the region. In 2008, members of the parliament in Bahrain debated whether her scheduled concert in the country should proceed. Despite the political discussion surrounding the event, the performance ultimately took place as planned.

Beyond her music career, Wehbe has remained a visible figure in Arab popular culture through her fashion, media appearances, and performances, contributing to her reputation as one of the most influential female entertainers in the contemporary Middle Eastern pop music landscape.

== Controversy ==
=== Age verification controversy ===
Wehbe claimed once that she was born in 1976, a date repeated by numerous sources. At one point, she mentioned that she is three years younger than her ex-husband Ahmed Abou Hashima, who was born in 1975. Her half-sister Rola Yamout posted a leaked document indicating that she was born in 1972.

=== Wardrobe incident ===
In November 2014, Wehbe caused controversy and was later heavily criticized, when she wore a revealing dress during a live episode of Arab Star Academy, where her bare buttocks were shown. She later apologized and blamed the stage lighting.

=== Allegations of racism ===
In 2009, the song Baba Fein sparked controversy after the lyrics referred to Nubians as "monkeys". Many Nubians in Egypt condemned the song, arguing that it promoted racism and discrimination, and called for it to be banned. In response to the widespread criticism, the contested lyric has since been removed from multiple music platforms.

=== COVID-19 vaccine comments ===
In 2020, Wehbe expressed skepticism about COVID-19 vaccines, questioning their rapid development compared with treatments for diseases such as cancer and HIV, saying she would not take one and later defending her stance while sharing videos questioning the vaccines' effectiveness and motives. In 2021, Wehbe reversed her position, saying that increased public awareness and medical advances had convinced her that COVID-19 vaccination was important.

== Political and social views ==
=== Support for Hezbollah ===
As a Muslim Shiite, Wehbe has at times expressed admiration for Hezbollah's role in defending Lebanon. During the 2006 Lebanon War, she left her home, in Verdun, Beirut and moved to Egypt for the duration of the conflict. In a concert in the Lebanese town of Jounieh, Wehbe congratulated Hezbollah leader Hassan Nasrallah for his stand against Israel during the war. Wehbe also refused to perform at any concert during the 34 days of the war, including fundraisers, saying that there were more ways than one to show support for Lebanon.

=== Comments on Algeria ===
Another incident occurred after the 2009 Egypt–Algeria World Cup dispute, adding to the diplomatic tension between the two countries. Wehbe went on to make statements that she would not be performing in Algeria anytime soon, because Algerians "...wouldn't understand her music". Algeria's cultural minister responded by stating that Wehbe would be banned from performing in Algeria for insulting Algeria and the Algerian people regardless of whether she apologizes.

=== Gaza flotilla ===
During the Mavi marmara incident in 2010, Wehbe expressed interest in joining a women-only aid flotilla to Gaza that had links to Hezbollah-aligned organizers. but was reportedly rejected by organizers linked to Hezbollah, who considered her image too "immodest". She reportedly stated that she was "under the command" of Hassan Nasrallah.

=== Fan support and public statements ===
In January 2012, Wehbe tweeted that she loves all her fans including her "gay fan base". In June 2017, she replied to someone's criticism on Twitter by writing: "When a faggot speaks", which was later deleted. In 2018, she shared a photo on Snapchat with a rainbow flag, signaling her support for the LGBT community. In February 2019, Wehbe launched a fashion brand, Beau Voyou, which had rainbow colors, in which she commented, "For me, equality goes all the way", then added, "Get ready to celebrate unrestricted and boundless love".

== Discography ==
=== Studio albums ===
- Houwa Al Zaman (2002)
- Baddi Aech (2005)
- Farashet El Wadi (2006)
- Habibi Ana (2008)
- Baby Haifa (2010)
- Malikat Jamal Al Kawn (2012)
- Hawwa (2018)

=== Singles and music videos ===
Year	Title	Music Video Director	Production
2002	Agoul Ahwak	Selim Al-Turk	Rotana
2002	Wahdi	Sameh Abdel Aziz	Dream TV
2003	Elhakni	Leila Bazzi & Fouad Suleiman	Beirut Marathon Association
2003	Ma Sar	Sameh Abdel Aziz	Rotana
2004	Ya Hayat Qalbi	Selim Al-Turk	Rotana
2005	Baddi Aech	Said Al-Marouk	Rotana
2005	La Ma Khilset	Toni Kahwaji	LBCI
2005	Teji Ezzai	Hadi Al-Bajuri	Mazzika
2005	Ragab	Hadi Al-Bajuri	Mazzika
2005	Aana Haifa	Hadi Al-Bajuri	Melody TV
2006	Bus al-Wawa	Emile Slailati	Melody
2007	Moush Adra Estana	Yahia Saadeh	Mazzika
2008	Matloch Li Had	Leila Kaanan	Mazzika
2008	Hassa Mabina Haga	Yahia Saadeh	Mazzika
2008	Sanara	Ahmad Al-Mahdi	Pepsi
2009	Baba Fin & Lama Al-Shams Trouah	Leila Kaanan	Rotana
2010	80 Million Ehsas	Mohammed Sami	Melody
2010	Enta Tani	Mohammed Sami	Melody
2010	Yama Lyali	Yahia Saadeh	Melody
2011	Bokra Bfarjik	Gianni Magnoni	Rotana
2012	Malikat Jamal Al Kawn		Rotana
2013	Ezzay Ansak	Angy Jammal	Rotana
2014	Breathing You In	Tarik Freitekh	VEVO
2018	Tota	Selim Al-Turk	Herself

== Filmography ==
=== Films ===
- Sea of Stars (2008)
- Dokkan Shehata (2011)
- Halawet Rouh (2014)
- Khair and Baraka (2017)
- Renegades of Europe (2022)

=== TV series ===
- Kalam Ala Warak (2014)
- Mawlid wa Sahibuh Ghayb (2015)
- Maryam (2015)
- Al Herbaya (2017)
- Lanaat Karma (2018)
