= A Girl's Secret =

2001 film

- Film poster
- Directed by: Magdy Ahmed Ali
- Written by: Magdy Ahmed Ali
- Starring: Dalal Abdel Aziz
- Release date: 2001
- Running time: 91 minutes
- Country: Egypt
- Language: Arabic

A Girl's Secret is a 2001 Egyptian drama film directed by Magdy Ahmed Ali. It was selected as the Egyptian entry for the Best Foreign Language Film at the 75th Academy Awards, but it was not nominated.

== Cast ==
- Dalal Abdel Aziz as Awatef - Yasmine's mother
- Ezzat Abou Aouf as Khaled - Yasmine's father
- Maya Sheiha as Yasmine

== See also ==
- List of submissions to the 75th Academy Awards for Best Foreign Language Film
- List of Egyptian submissions for the Academy Award for Best Foreign Language Film
