= Zelal (disambiguation) =

Zelal may refer to:

- Zelal, a 2010 documentary film
- Zelal Baturay (born 1996), Turkish women's footballer
- Zelal Cola, a cola brand soft drink produced and marketed in Germany
