= Reem al-Baroudi =

Egyptian actress (born 1979

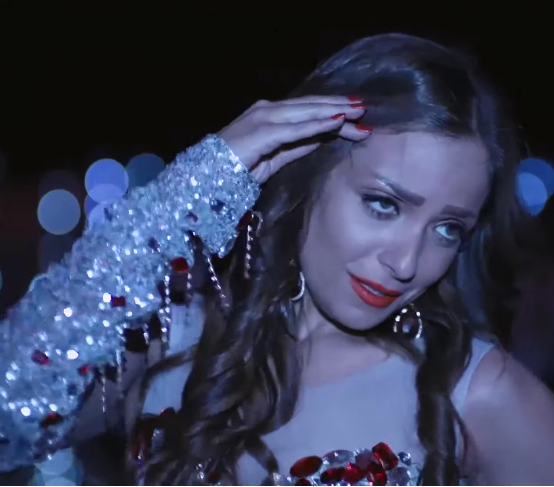
- Born: Reham Magdy Medhat Ezat al-Baroudi; 6 October 1979 (age 46); Cairo, Egypt
- Occupation: Actress
- Years active: 1994–present
- Spouse: Ahmed Saad (m. 2017; div. 2017)
- Relatives: Shams al-Baroudi (cousin); Ghada Adel (cousin)

Reham Magdy Medhat Al Baroudi (born 6 October 1979), known as Reem al-Baroudi (Arabic: ريم البارودي), is an Egyptian Actor. She began her career in 1994.

== Career ==
She completed her study in Tourism and Hotels college. She began her career as a model in ads. Her other most famous roles were in The Hedgehog in 1997, The Devil's Garden with Jamal Suliman and Somaya El Khashab, The Doubt in 2013, Girls Dandle in 2014, Zigzag in 2014, Chess in 2015 and Seven Girls in 2016. She won Artist award as best actress for her role in Family Restriction from Ministry of Culture of Algeria.

== Personal life ==
After years of relationship with singer Ahmed Saad, they married in 2017, but divorced after 21 days. Ahmed Saad, shortly after the divorce, married actress Somaya El Khashab.

Reem is of Syrian origin, she is second cousin of Shams al-Baroudi and third cousin of Ghada Adel.

== Works ==
=== TV Series ===
TV Series
Year	Name	Role
1994	Earth secrets	
1995	Marriage one may way	
1997	The Hedgehog	
1998	AlQarmooti in secret mission	
2001	Hamza and his five daughters	
2001	The birds flied to east	Mariam Shemeon
2006	Satan gardens	Sabreen
2006	Love after negotiation	
2007	System point	
2007	Womans heart	
2007	The Prey and The Hunter	Salma
2007	Azhar	Shahad
2007	Your dreams is orders	Farida
2008	Hearts wall	Dr Manal
2008	Horror and love days	Durra
2009	ALRahaya	Farha
2009	AlBatenya	Marwa
2010	Mountain kingdom	Noorhan
2010	Se Omar and Laila afendi	
2011	Dignity case	Rana
2011	Abed Karman	Monique
2011	we are The students	Susu
2012	The escaping	Aisha
2013	Jawafa theory	
2013	The scorpion	Ashjan
2013	The doubt	Samar
2014	Girls dandle	Nawal
2015	Crown prince	Maha
2015–2016	Chess	Mervat
2016	The seven girls	Muna
2016	Lineage issue	Samar
2017	Life taste	
2017	shash on cotton	Sara
2018	The string	
2018	ElDawly	Semsema
2018	30 night and night	
2019	Family restriction	Marwa
2020	Jamee salem	Karima
2020	The secret	

=== Films ===
Films
Year	Name	Role
1995	A Woman Who Shook the Throne of Egypt	Nariman
2011	The elephant in napkin	Maali
2011	Ya ana ya howa	Jamila
2013	The escapers	Abeer
2014	Zigzag	Reem
2014	Girls dandle	Nawal
2017	Halimo legend of beaches	
2018	My wife's fiance	
2019	Death line	
2020	Virus	

=== Stage ===
Stage
Year	Name
1995	constitution our masters
1995	Nashnat ya naseh
2007	Barhooma waklah elbarouma
2008	Zay elfoul
2019	Gawaza mertaha
