= Ahmed Magdy =

Ahmed Magdy may refer to:

- Ahmed Magdy (footballer, born 1986), Egyptian football defender
- Ahmed Magdy (footballer, born 1989), Egyptian football right wing back
- Ahmed Magdy (actor) (born 1986), Egyptian-Algerian actor and director
