= Mohammed Hussein Al Shaali =

Personal details
- Born: 1950 (age 75–76)
- Children: 7
- Education: Beirut Arab University

Mohammed Hussein Al Shaali (born 1950) is an Emirati politician who formerly served as Minister of State for Foreign Affairs of the United Arab Emirates.

== Education and career ==
He obtained his bachelor's degree in management and economy from Beirut Arab University before joining the Foreign Ministry, where he was Director of Arab World Department (1982–1985), ambassador to the UN and non-resident ambassador to Canada (1986–1987) where he also acted as the country's representative to the Security Council. From 1992 to 1999, he was ambassador to the US, and was later assigned as UAE Permanent Representative to the UN European Headquarters in Geneva.

== Personal life ==
Al Shaali is married and father of 7.
