= Les Petits Chats =

Egyptian rock band

- Origin: Cairo, Egypt
- Genres: Rock, pop
- Years active: 1967–1980s
- Label: Sono Cairo
- Past members: George Lukas; Ezzat Abu Ouf; Freddy Rizk; Teymour Kouta; Wagdi Francis; Pino Phares; Sadek Gallini; Omar Khairat

Les Petits Chats (Little Cats) was an Egyptian rock band from Cairo that was formed in the 1960s. It was founded by Wagdi Francis.

== Background ==
The group was founded by Wagdi Francis. He started off playing bass but then moved over to vocals. Sadek Gallini also sang lead for the group. It was formed in 1967, just after the Arab-Israeli war. Besides Francis, the other founding members were Ezzat Abou Aouf, Omar Khairat, Freddy (Farid) Rizk and Beirge Andreassian and They rivaled The Black Coats, a group that included Ismaiel El Hakeem, who is the son of Tawfiq al-Hakim, the famous Egyptian writer. In addition to their own country, they also toured other countries which included Syria and Lebanon. They also had a massive cult following and were a visible part of the modern Egyptian culture.

== Career ==
=== 1960s to 1970s ===
In 1971, Sadek Gallini and the group, The Cats had a single released on the Sono Cairo label, "La La Means I Love You" b/w "With a Little Help from My Friends". Omar Khairat left Les Petits Chats that year. He pursued his own direction which included composing music for the cinema industry and also television.

=== 1980s to 2000s ===
The group stopped performing in the 1980s but made a comeback in 2009.

== Later years ==
The group reunited in 2016.

Founding member Wagdi Francis died on 12 April 2017. According to Egypt Today, the band was to perform on October 20 with an orchestra at Cairo Opera House in his memory. The line-up in October was Sobhy Bedeer and Sadek Keleeny on vocals, Ezzat Abu Ouf on keyboard, Pino Phares on guitar. The new members playing with the group were maestro Nayer Nagui, and bassist Deyaa Badr.

== Film ==
In early October 2015, a trailer for the documentary Les Petits Chats was posted online. In a week, it attracted 60,000 views. According to Cairo Scene, film would take a closer look into the lives of the band members around the time of their popularity as well as prior to and post that period. Also to be looked at was the line up changes that took place over the years before. Cairo Scene also mentioned that the film was to premiere at the Arabian Sights Film Festival in Washington DC on 16 and 17 October.

It was announced in the July 20, 2017 issue of The National that the 2015 film about the band which was directed by Sherif Nakhla was to be screened at Abu Dhabi's Mina Zayed on Saturday 5 August. Nakhla is the step-son of one of the band members.
