= Israa Seblani =

Lebanese-American doctor

- Born: 1991 (age 34–35); Baalbek, Baalbek-Hermel; Lebanon
- Education: Beirut Arab University
- Occupation: Doctor
- Spouse: Ahmad Sbeih (m. 2020)

Israa Al Seblani (born 1991) is a Lebanese-American physician and endocrinologist. She is a survivor of the 2020 Beirut explosion that occurred on 4 August 2020. Later that month, a video went viral of Seblani having her bridal portraits taken when the explosion occurred.

== Biography ==
Seblani interned at Hammoud Hospital University Medical Center in Sidon.

In 2013, she immigrated to the United States, moving to Michigan City, Indiana then moved to Troy, Michigan to complete a residency in endocrinology at a hospital in Detroit.

Seblani met Ahmad Sbeih, a businessman who owns two clothing stores, in November 2016 at a Starbucks in Beirut, while she was visiting family. She and her husband had been waiting three years to get married, due to protests in Lebanon, the COVID-19 pandemic, and since her husband had been unable to obtain an immigrant visa to leave Lebanon and come to the United States. They had originally wanted to get married in the United States, but chose to have the wedding in Lebanon due to difficulty obtaining a visa for Sbeih. Seblani has been pleading with federal government officials in the United States to speed up her husband's visa. She returned to Lebanon in July 2020 for her wedding.

On 4 August 2020, Seblani was posing for bridal portraits outside of the Le Grey Hotel in Saifi Village before her wedding. During the photoshoot an explosion occurred at the Port of Beirut, less than a mile away from where Seblani was standing. The explosion, caused by more than 2,700 tonnes of ammonium nitrate, killed at least 145 people and left over 5,000 people injured. Her videographer, Mahmoud Nakib, captured the detonation taking place on camera. Her fiancé, Ahmad Sbeih, had stepped away from the photoshoot to grab waters for her and the photographer. Immediately after the blast, Sbeih ran to retrieve Seblani, taking shelter in a nearby restaurant. The couple sustained no physical injuries from the explosion. After calling her family, Seblani ran out to provide medical care to other victims of the blast. They were married in a ceremony after the explosion.

The video of Seblani's photography session during which the explosion occurred became a viral video on the internet.

Seblani has stated that she loves Lebanon, but feels that after the explosion, living there is not an option due to safety concerns. She returned to the United States in September 2020. After the explosion, Seblani and her husband have received support in the immigration process from U.S. Senator Gary Peters and U.S. Congresswoman Haley Stevens.

She is a dual citizen of the United States and Lebanon.
