= Hilmi M. Zawati =

Palestinian jurist and poet (born 1953)

- Awards: Adèle Mellen Prize (2004)

Academic background
- Education: Beirut Arab University; McGill University (D.C.L.); Central Philippine University (Ph.D.); University of the Punjab; University of Khartoum; University of Alexandria

Academic work
- Discipline: international criminal law and human rights

Hilmi M. Zawati (Arabic: حلمي زواتي; born in 1953 in Nablus) is an international criminal law and human rights jurist, Professor of Criminal Law, and Former Chair at the Center for Justice and Accountability (CIAJ).

Zawati has been a speaker and author on a number of hotly debated legal issues. He has addressed major academic and professional gatherings in a number of Middle Eastern countries, Africa, Europe, the United States, and in Canada. His current primary teaching and research areas are: International Criminal Law; International Gender Justice System; International Human Rights Law; Islamic Law of Nations (siyar); and International Environmental Law of Armed Conflict.

== Select Bibliography ==
- Fair Labelling and the Dilemma of Prosecuting Gender-Based Crimes at the International Criminal Tribunals, 2014.
- The Triumph of Ethnic Hatred and the Failure of International Political Will: Gendered Violence and Genocide in the Former Yugoslavia and Rwanda, 2010.
- Selected Socio-Legal Bibliography on Ethnic Cleansing, Wartime Rape, and Genocide in the Former Yugoslavia and Rwanda, with Ibtisam M. Mahmoud, 2004 ISBN 978-0-7734-6260-1
- Tarfud al-Sarj al-Jiyad [The Horses Reject the Saddle], 1982.
- Qublah Ala Jabin al-Shams [A Kiss on the Face of the Sun], 1979.
- Inaq al-Mawt [The Hug of the Death], 1977.
- Bil-Hirab Ala Wajh al-Daya' (With Daggers on the Face of Homelessness], 1976.
- Abir al-Dima’ [Fragrance of Blood], 1973.
