= Magdy Ahmed Ali =

Egyptian director (born 1952)

- مجدي أحمد علي
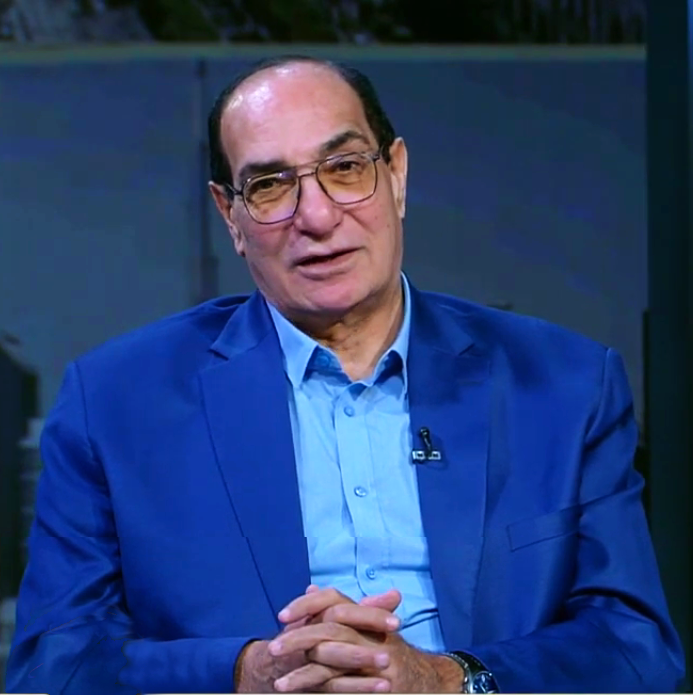
- Born: August 26, 1952 (age 73)
- Education: Cairo Higher Institute of Cinema
- Occupations: Director, actor, screenwriter
- Children: 3, including Ahmed Magdy

Magdy Ahmed Ali (born August 26, 1952) is an Egyptian director, actor, and screenwriter. He studied directing at the Cairo Higher Institute of Cinema after completing his studies at the Faculty of Pharmacy. He began his artistic career working as an assistant director with many directors, including Mohamed Khan, Khairy Beshara, and Youssef Chahine.

He worked as an assistant director for the 1988 film The Wife of an Important Man. He directed his first film Ya Donia Ya Gharami in 1996. His film A Girl's Secret was selected as the Egyptian entry for the Best Foreign Language Film at the 75th Academy Awards, but it was not nominated. He wrote and directed the 2016 film Mawlana.

He has three children, including Egyptian actor Ahmed Magdy.

== Filmography ==
=== Film ===
Directed features
| Year | Title | Ref. |
|---|---|---|
| 1996 | Ya Donia Ya Gharami | |
| 2001 | A Girl's Secret | |
| 2008 | Fawzeya's Secret Recipe | |
| 2009 | Birds of the Nile | |
| 2016 | Mawlana | |
| 2022 | 2 Talaat Harb | |
