= Habibi Ana =

Studio album by Haifa Wehbe
- Released: July 4, 2008
- Recorded: 2006–2008
- Genres: Arabic pop; dance
- Length: 62:43
- Label: Mazzika
- Producer: Mohsen Gaber

Haifa Wehbe chronology
Farashet El Wadi (2006)	Habibi Ana (2008)	Baby Haifa (2010)

Singles from "Habibi Ana"
- 1. "Mosh Adra Astna" Released: 2007; 2. "Mat'olesh Lehad" Released: 2008; 3. "Hasa Ma Bena" Released: 2008; 4. "Yaben el Halal" Released: 2008

Habibi Ana (Arabic: حبيبي أنا) is the fourth studio album from the Lebanese singer Haifa Wehbe released in 2008. The album contains 15 tracks. Haifa worked on this album with various famous songwriters, composers, and arrangers. The album contains the already three released singles, "Mosh Adra Astna", "Mat'olesh Lehad", and "Hasa Ma Bena".

== Track listing ==
#	Title	Length	Dialect
1	"Habibi Ana (My Love)"	3:41	Egyptian
2	"Yaben El Halal (O' Good Man)"	4:30	Egyptian
3	"Ba'd Elly Hasalli (After What Happened To Me)"	4:28	
4	"Alby Hab (My Heart Loved)"	4:02	
5	"Olt Eih (What Did You Say?)"	4:24	
6	"Mat'olesh Lehad (Don't Tell Anyone)"	4:27	Lebanese
7	"Metakhda (Taken)"	3:57	
8	"Ayami (My Days)"	3:42	Lebanese
9	"Hat Alaya El Lom (Just Keep Blaming Me)"	4:01	
10	"Tesmahli Adla'ak (Allow Me To Play With You)"	3:52	
11	"Khayna (traitor)"	4:38	
12	"Hasa fi haga " (Something In Me)"	4:47	Egyptian
13	"Ma Tkallemnish (Don't Talk To Me)"	4:27	
14	"Ihasai Beek (My Feelings Towards You)"	3:41	
15	"Mosh Adra Astana (I Just Can't Wait)"	4:07	
