= Somaya El Khashab =

Egyptian actress and singer (born 1966)

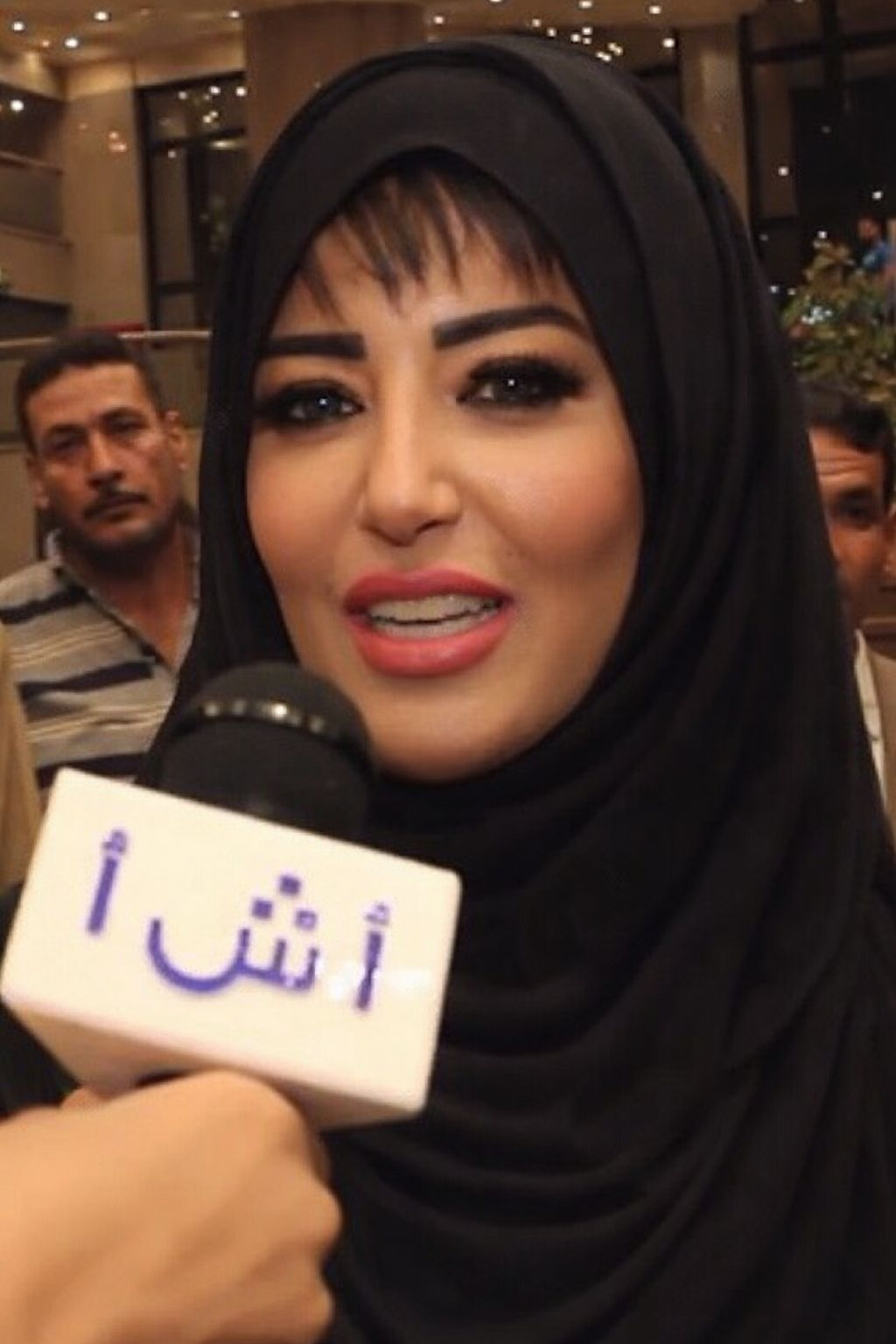
- Somaya El Khashab in 2014
- Born: Somaya Saeed Said Fetiha El Khashab; October 20, 1966 (age 59); Alexandria, Egypt
- Education: Alexandria University
- Occupations: Actress; singer
- Years active: 1998–present
- Spouse: Ahmed Saad (m. 2017; div. 2019)

Somaya El Khashab (Note: Full name: Somaya Saeed Said Fetiha El Khashab; Arabic: سمية سعيد السيد فتيحة الخشاب [soˈmæj.jæ sæˈʕiːd esˈsæj.jed feˈtiːħæ l.xæʃˈʃæːb]. Her family name is pronounced in the pausa [el.xæʃˈʃæːb].) (born on 20 October 1966) is an Egyptian actress and singer. She began her career in 1998, acting in many series and movies, and became one of the most famous actresses in Egypt, winning many awards. She also became a singer in 2009 after releasing her first album Hayessal eh.

== Career ==
Somaya El Khashab graduated from Faculty of Commerce in Alexandria University in 1997. She began her career in 1998, her first work was in Earth secret TV series in 1998. her most famous roles in TV series was in Alhaj Metwali family in 2001 with Nour El-Sherif, The truth and The illusion in 2003 with Fifi Abdou and Yousuf Shaaban, Raya and Sakina in 2005 with Abla Kamel, Interview on life with Yousra and Hesham Selim, Mahmood Almasri with Mahmoud Abdel Aziz, The Satan Gardens in 2006 with Jamal Suliman, Kayd elnesa in 2009, Kings valley in 2011, Wind inherit in 2013, Alhalal in 2017. her most famous roles in movies was in Randeefo in 2001 with Kal Naga, Mediterranean man in 2001, I love you, me to in 2003 with Mostafa Qamar, Honor day in 2004 with Ahmed Ezz, The Yacoubian Building with Adel Emam and Hend Sabry, Justified treason in 2006 with Hany Salama and May Ez El deen. She also begun her career in music in 2009 after releasing her album Hayessal eh, she make many music video with Yehia Saada and Rindala Kodeih. She released her last song in 2019 with Jamil Almaghazi. She won many awards from her works, she won Murex d'Or award from Lebanon in 2009 as best Arab actress. She also won ART award from Arab Radio and Television Network in 2013 as best actress for her role in Wind inherit TV series. She was honored in Saudi Arabia after releasing her song “Btstaawa” where she tackled violence against women.

== Personal life ==
She announced that she married four times secretly. In 2017, she married Egyptian singer Ahmed Saad, they divorced shortly in March 2019. She accused Ahmed Saad of domestic abuse during a TV interview with Basma Wehbe.

== Works ==
=== TV Series ===
Year	English name	Arabic name	Role
1998	Earth secret	سر الأرض	
1998	The Fingerprint	البصمة	
1998	The Calculation	الحساب	Nada
1999	Gentleman honorable	حضرة المحترم	Radhea Abdul Khaleq
2000	Excuse me, I didn't mean	سامحوني ماكنش قصدي	
2000	The fajala	الفجالة	Fatema
2001	Repear and present	ضبط وإحضار	
2001	Alhaj Metwali family	عائلة الحاج متولي	Madeha
2002	Sanaye sanaye	صنايع صنايع	
2003	The truth and The mirage	الحقيقة والسراب	Nabila
2005	Raya and Sakina	ريا وسكينة	Sakina
2005	Interview on air	لقاء على الهوا	Nancy
2005	Mahmoud Almasri	محمود المصري	Katrina
2006	Toto and Pijama	توتو وبيجامة	Pijama
2006	The Satan gardens	حدائق الشيطان	Qamar
2009	Sea throwing	حدف بحر	Meshmesh
2011	Women trick	كيد النسا	Safeya
2011	Kings valley	وادي الملوك	Najeya
2013	Wind inherit	ريح الميراث	Rahma
2015	Me or you	يا أنا يا إنتي	Sohoka/Soso
2017	Alhalal	الحلال	Dahbeya/Kodeya
2019	Tribes daughter	بنت القبائل	

=== Movies ===
Year	English name	Arabic name	Role
1999	The bed	السرير	
2001	Rendezvous	رانديفو	Toto/Tahani
2001	Mediterranean man	الرجل الأبيض المتوسط	Caramela
2003	How girls love you	ازاي البنات تحبك	Bosi
2003	I love you, me too	بحبك وانا كمان	Farida
2004	Honor day	يوم الكرامة	Malak Henawi
2005	Ali Spacy	علي سبايسي	Dunia
2006	The Yacoubian Building	عمارة يعقوبيان	Suad
2006	Justified treason	خيانة مشروعة	Shahad
2007	Hena maysara	حين ميسرة	Nahed
2008	Master Omar Harb	الريس عمر حرب	Habiba
2010	Operation 301	عملية 301	
2012	One hour and half	ساعة ونص	Saffeya
2015	The big night	الليلة الكبيرة	Nemat

=== Stage ===
Year	English name	Arabic name			
1998	Shaqawa	شقاوة			
2003	Keda okay	كدة اوكاي	2020	hob l elegar	mora

=== Albums ===
Year	Name	Producing company	Singles
2009	Hayessal eh	Platinum records	10

=== Music videos ===
Year	Song	Director	Producing company
2009	Ayzak keda	Yehia Saada	Platinum records
2009	Kolen baaqalo radi	Yehia Saada	Platinum records
2013	Thawrat Alshaab opret	Khaled Jalal	Egyptian Television Network
2016	Ya meskeen	Rindala Kodeih	herself
2019	Btstaawa	Jamil Jamil Al Maghazi	herself
2020	Arabeia Ana	Rindala Kodeih	herself
