= Marianne Khoury =

Egyptian film director (born 1958)

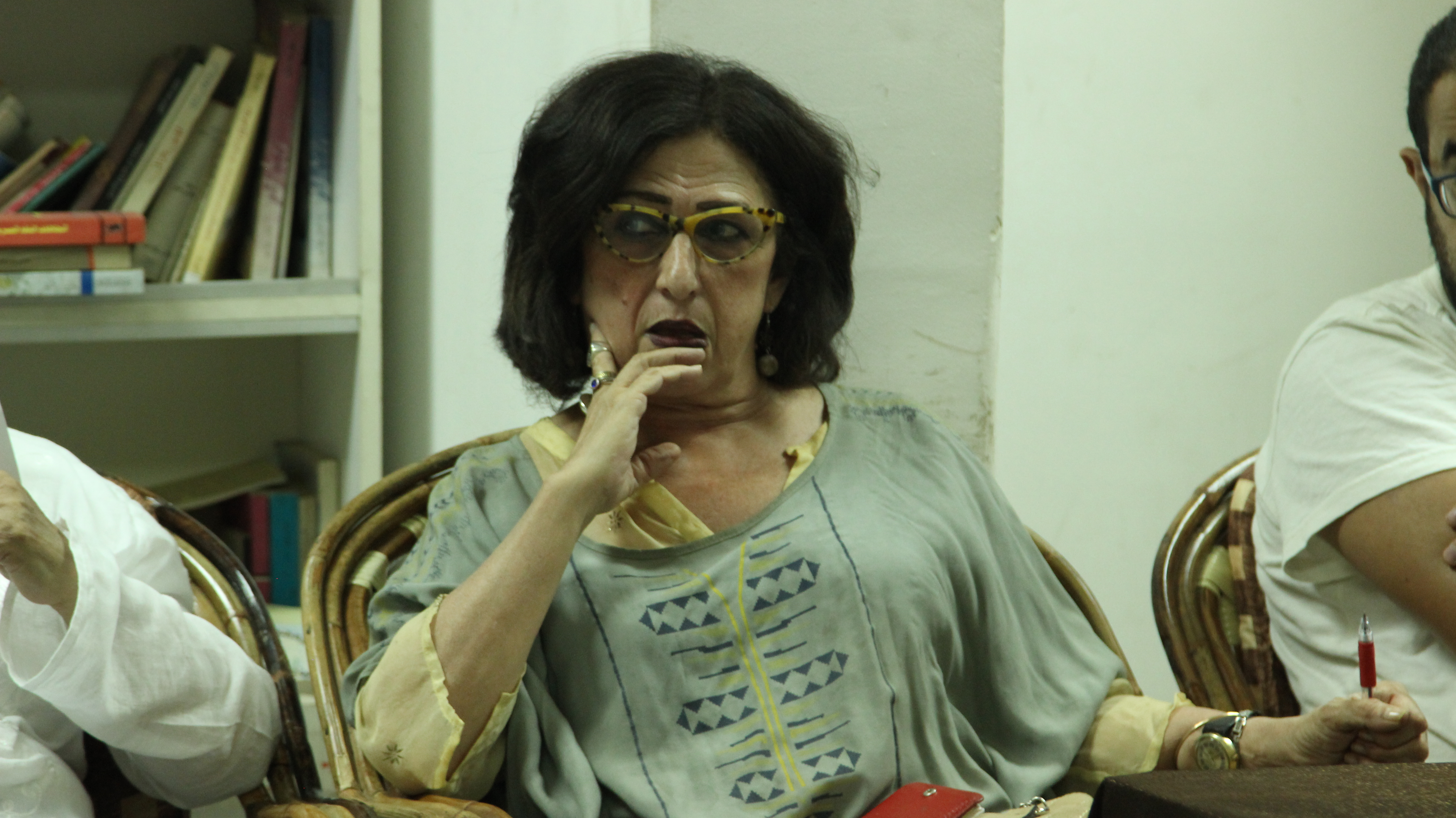
- Born: 1958 (age 67–68); Cairo, Egypt
- Education: American University in Cairo (BA); Oxford University (MA)
- Occupations: Film director, producer
- Relatives: Youssef Chahine (uncle)

Marianne Khoury (born 1958) is Egyptian film director and producer.

== Early life and education ==
Marianne Khoury was born in 1958 in Cairo. She received her BA in economics and political science from the American University in Cairo in 1980, and her MA in economics from Oxford University in the United Kingdom in 1982.

== Career ==
Khoury collaborated on multiple films with her uncle Youssef Chahine.

She is a managing partner of Misr International Films, which Chahine founded.

== Other activities ==
Khoury was a jury at the 33rd Cairo International Film Festival for the digital competition in 2009. She was also on the jury at the 2012 Cannes Film Festival for the "Nikon Discovery Award for Short Film".

In 2023 she was appointed artistic director of the El Gouna Film Festival. The 2023 festival was postponed several months owing to the Gaza war, but the 2024 El Gouna Film Festival was held in its usual month of October

== Recognition and honours ==
Khoury was awarded France's Legion of Honour in 2022.

== Filmography ==
=== Director ===
- Women Who Loved Cinema (2002)
- Zelal (2010)
- Let's Talk (2019)

=== Producer ===
- Adieu Bonaparte (1985)
- The City (1999)
- The Other (1999)
- Silence, We're Rolling (2001)
- 11′09″01 September 11 (2002) (segment "Egypt")
- Alexandria... New York (2004)
