= Mawlana (novel) =

2012 novel by Ibrahim Issa

- First edition
- Author: Ibrahim Issa
- Language: Arabic
- Publisher: Bloomsbury - Qatar Foundation Publishing
- Publication date: 2012
- Publication place: Egypt
- Pages: 554

Mawlana (Arabic: مولانا), originally published under the title Our Protector, is a 2012 novel by Egyptian journalist Ibrahim Eissa. The novel delves into various topics, including Islamic issues surrounding the Prophet's hadith, the Mu'tazilah, Shi'ism, the treatment of dhimmis, terrorism, and the sheikhs of satellite channels. At the center of the story is Sheikh Hatem Al-Shennawi, referred to as "Mawlana" in the novel, who serves as the main character. He embodies a flexible and cheerful preacher, a "Daeia," who takes into account the circumstances and needs of the current generation.

One of the notable aspects of this extensive novel, spanning 554 pages, is its linguistic richness. The language used draws from the heritage language that still maintains its ability to resonate, encompassing the language of the Qur’an, hadith, jurisprudence, and interpretation. This linguistic texture is intertwined with the social, religious, and political backdrop, showcasing the writer's perspective.

The novel was adapted into a movie in 2016, directed by Ahmed Magdy, with Amr Saad portraying the lead character. In 2013, Mawlana won the popular vote and was shortlisted for a jury selection of the Poker awards for Arabic fiction.

Regarding the novel, Ibrahim Issa stated, "I began writing this novel in 2009 while opposing the former president, amidst my trials and eventual dismissal from the constitution, I was forbidden from writing until the revolution broke out. And through the transition period, I continued writing until last March 2012. It is one of the dearest novels to my heart "

== See also ==
- Mawlana
