= Talal Al Awamleh =

Jordanian producer

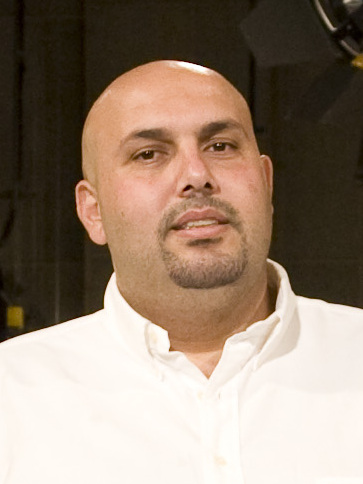
- Occupation: Producer
- Known for: Arab Telemedia Group
- Awards: Emmy Award for The Invasion Series
- Website: http://www.arabtelemedia.net/

Talal Al-Awamleh (Arabic: طلال العوامله; born September 9, 1974) is a Jordanian producer. He is the executive producer and CEO of Arab Telemedia Group which was founded by his father Adnan Al-Awamleh in 1983.

Al-Awamleh was born in Amman, Jordan, in September 1974. He was born to the Jordanian producer Adnan Al-Awamleh and the Jordanian TV presenter Suha Toqan. Al-Awamleh was educated at Al-Rae’d Al Arabi school. He then obtained his Bachelor degree in political science from university of Jordan in 1996.

Talal Started working with his father at Arab Telemedia company while studying in university; and in 2002 he took over the company’s management and became the CEO of the company. The group has been in the market for more than 35 years and has created thousands of hours of original television programs, including The Sons of Al-Rashid, Abu Ja’far Al-mansour, Al-Hajjaj, Malik Bin Al-Rayeb and Shahrazad. Arab Telemedia is an innovate group that services and support the production and broadcast industry in domestic and regional markets.

In 2008, Al-Awamleh was awarded the first ever International Emmy Award for Best Telenovela for the dramatic series Al-Igtiyah (The Invasion), which made him the first Arab producer to ever win an Emmy.
