= Awn Access to Justice Network in Gaza Strip =

Logo of Awn Access to Justice Network in Gaza Strip AJ Net

It used to call "Network of Legal Aid Providers Awn", in March 2013 the member of the network change the name to "Awn Access to Justice Network in Gaza Strip" AJ Net. Also known as "Awn Network" (Arabic: شبكة عون), many people in Gaza prefer to call it Legal Clinics (Arabic: العيادة القانونية), it was established by UNDP/PAPP – Gaza in ِApril-2011. It's comprised primarily from organizations that are non-public, non-state civil society actors that are politically unaffiliated.

== The Network ==
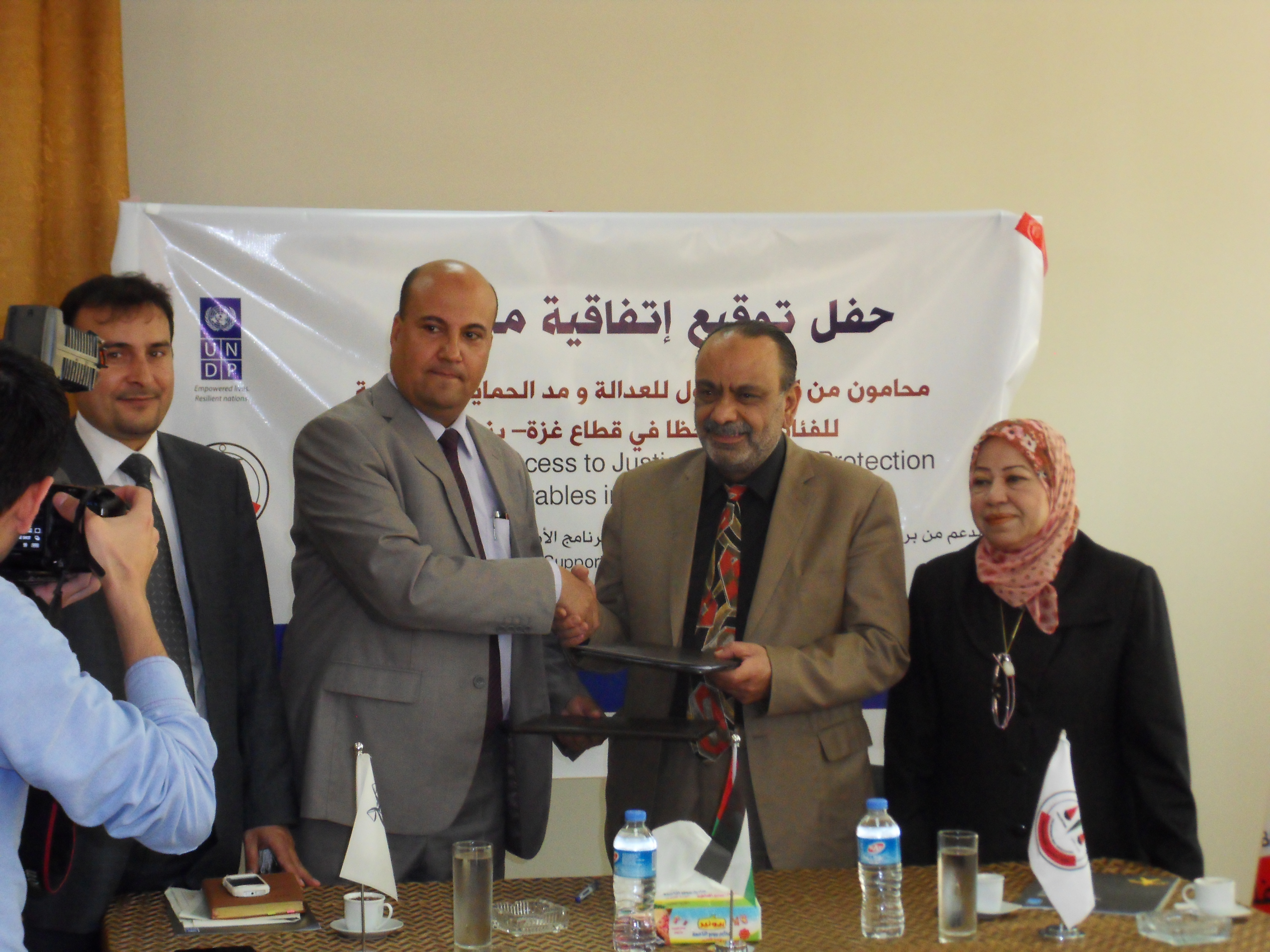
Agreement Signing Ceremony between UNDP Palestine (Ibrahim Abu-shammalah left) and Bar Associations (Salama Bseiso right), Gaza City April 25, 2013.

The members of Awn Network are; the Palestinian Bar Association, human right organizations, community-based organizations and academic institutions, the permanent secretariat of the Awn Network is within the Palestinian Bar Association. In 2012 network members provided legal aid services (awareness, consultation and representation) to more than 23,000 people, of whom 72% were women. Awn Net has invested heavily in coordination and cooperation within the 20 members of the network by supporting dialogue meetings (including the Legal Task Force), referral mechanisms, the case management system and the legal aid database, while continuing to provide capacity development support to individual network members and working to ensure sustainability of the network. Awn Network has provided legal services to mainly poor and vulnerable people, to strengthen their access to justice and solve their legal problems at the lowest and simplest level possible.

== Legal services provided ==
Legal services start with legal information and education, giving people knowledge that they have rights under the law and how to exercise them. Such knowledge and confidence can help in solving legal problems without recourse to the courts, a cost-effective and empowering strategy. Where legal remedies are available, this can be the cheapest and simplest form of legal aid, and the one where the greatest resources should be applied. Legal advice (explaining what the law means and how to exercise it in relation to a concrete problem) is often less costly than providing assistance – understood as helping a person to take legal steps to protect their rights. Free judicial representation by Awn Network's legal aid lawyers is only limited to poor individuals who can't afford paying courts fees or lawyers’ costs.

Statistics for people Benefited from Awn Access to Justice Network in Gaza Strip, From April 2011 to May 2013.

Free Legal Aid Services
	Total of Beneficiaries	Females	Males
Legal Advice and Consultation	4115	2826	1289
Legal Mediation	3065	2060	1005
Legal Representation	342	273	69
Judicial Representation (Civil Courts)	388	327	61
Judicial Representation (Shariá Courts)	870	750	120
Total	8780	6236	2544
Successfully Adjudicated (Civil Cases)	239	181	58
Successfully Adjudicated (Shariá Cases)	622	490	132

Public Legal Awareness
Sessions	Hours	Total of Beneficiaries	Females	Males	Boys	Girls
1288	644	36,358	27,580	8766	10	2

Other Services
Type of Assistance	Total of Beneficiaries	Females	Males	Boys	Girls
Social Assistance	41	31	0	0	10
Psychosocial Support	1030	933	72	0	25
Other Assistance	1975	1756	192	0	27
Total	3046	2720	264	0	62

== Legal Aid Clinics ==
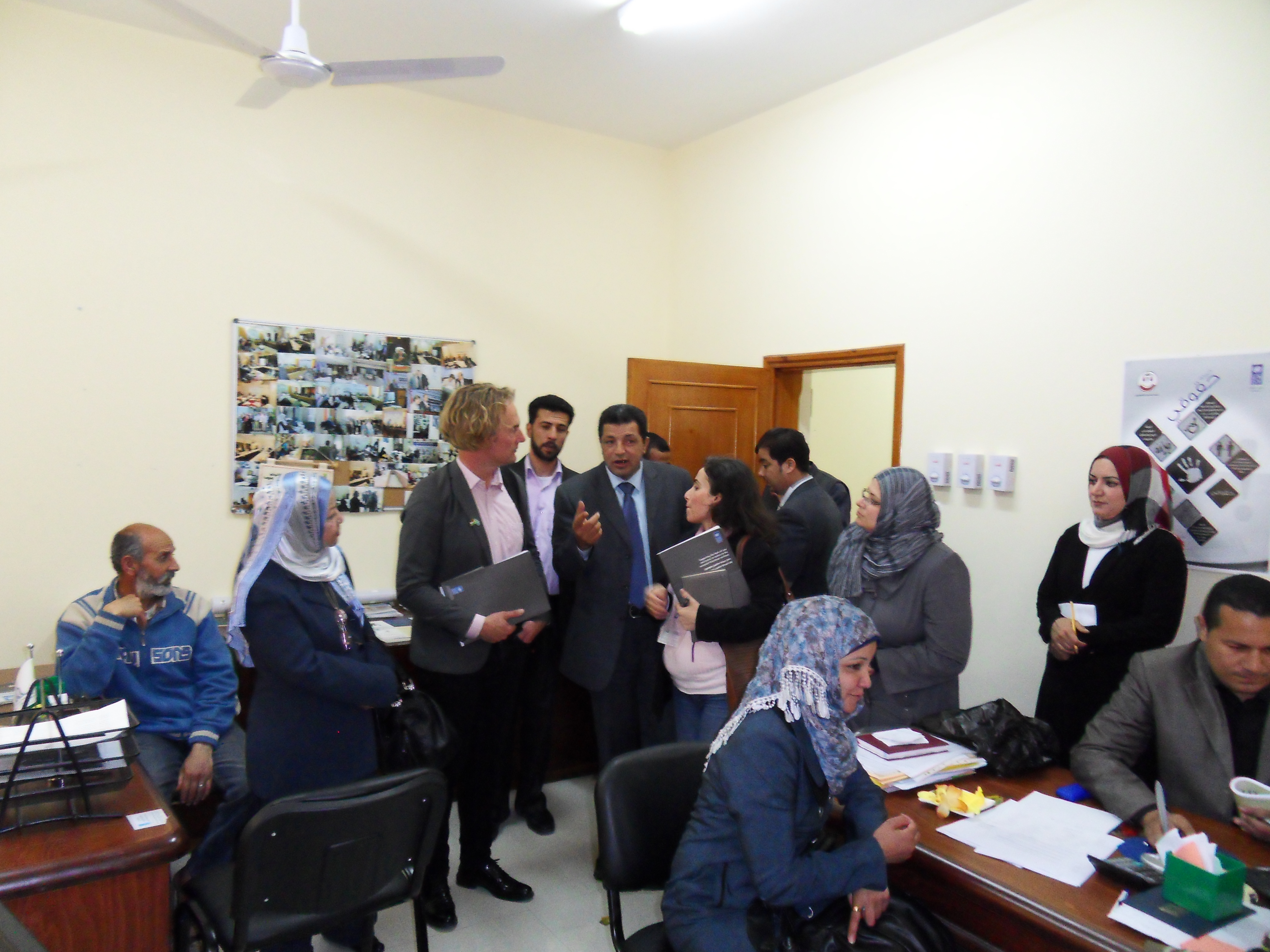
Fredrik Westerholm from the Consulate General of Sweden in Jerusalem visiting the Legal Aid clinic in Palestinian Bar Association, Gaza City 7-4-2013

The Awn Network oversees 14 legal aid clinics. There are two types of legal clinics, university/in-campus legal clinics and community legal aid clinics. The community legal aid clinics are based at civil society organizations and aims at providing free of charge legal services to needy people and enhancing access to justice. The purpose of in-campus legal clinics is to encourage students’ engagement with the issues and concerns of the community. In addition, students are exposed to hands-on legal experience and they receive high-quality training on legal skills

== Gaza Legal Aid Network Members ==
The Secretary-General for Awn net is Mr Salama Bseiso 2011–2013, the following NGOs are the main members of the net:

- The Palestinian Bar Association
- Al-Azhar University – Gaza
- Islamic University of Gaza
- University of Palestine – Gaza
- University College of Applied Sciences
- The National Society for Democracy and Law
- The Culture and Free Thoughts Association
- Union of Women Programs Centers (7 branches)
- Women Affairs Center
- Al Atta’ Benevolent Association
- Palestinian Commission for Refugees
- Palestinian Institute for Communication and Development
- Hadaf Center for Human Rights
- Aisha Association for the Protection of Women and Children
- Community Media Center
- Coalition for Justice
- South Women Media Forum
- Center for Women's Legal Research and Consulting
- El Wedad Rehabilitation Society
- Palestinian Center for Democracy and Conflict Resolution
