= Abdulla Ghanim Almuhannadi =

Qatari writer

- عبدالله غانم المهندي
- Born: August 7, 1973; Al Khor, Qatar
- Education: Beirut Arab University; Autonomous University of Madrid; University of Houston; Cairo University
- Occupations: Journalist; editor; businessman
- Years active: 1991–present
- Employers: Qatar Media Corporation (since 2023– ); Al Raya newspaper (2019–2023); Al-Khor SC (2016–2019)

Abdulla Ghanim Almuhannadi (Arabic: عبدالله غانم المهندي; (born April 4, 1973) is a Qatari writer, senior media personality, and businessman. He was editor-in-chief of Al Raya newspaper, and recently Director of the Quality and Planning Department, and Director of the International Cooperation Office at the Qatar Media Corporation.

== Biography ==
Almuhannadi was born on August 7, 1973, in Al Khor, Qatar. He obtained a bachelor's degree in law from Beirut Arab University in 2000. He also holds a master's degree in law from the Autonomous University of Madrid, Diploma in Sports Management from Cairo University, and Diploma in Public Relations and Media Management from the University of Houston in 2015.

Almuhannadi began his career in journalism and media in 1991, when he worked as a public relations officer at the Qatari Emiri Diwan until 1995. He then became Deputy Head of Public Relations from 1995 to 2009. From 2000 to 2004, he was the Secretary of the Qatar National Teams Committee in the Qatar Football Association. He was Director of Legal Affairs at the Qatar Football Association between 2005 and 2008, then Director of Legal Affairs at the Qatar Stars League from 2008 to 2010. In 2016, he became CEO of Al-Khor Sports Club. From 2019 to 2023, he was editor-in-chief of Al Raya, a Qatari newspaper. Almuhannadi also served as Head of Local Affairs and Editor-in-Chief of Local Affairs and Economic Sectors at Al-Watan.

Currently, Almuhannadi is a managing director and CEO of the Al-Alfia Holding Group; MENA Managing Partner for ComAve; co-founder of Sports Makers Company; and legal advisor, Director of the Quality and Planning Department, and Director of the International Cooperation Office at the Qatar Media Corporation.
