= Mawlana (film) =

- Directed by: Magdy Ahmed Ali; Essam Abdel Hamid
- Written by: Ibrahim Issa; Magdy Ahmed Ali
- Starring: Amr Saad; Dorra Zarrouk; Ahmed Magdy
- Release date: January 27, 2016 (Egypt)
- Running time: 117 minutes
- Country: Egypt
- Language: Arabic

Mawlana (also known as The Preacher) is a 2016 Egyptian film directed by Magdy Ahmed Ali, based on a novel written by journalist Ibrahim Eissa of the same name. The film follows the journey of a renowned television preacher from the historic Al-Azhar Islamic institution in Cairo as he attempts to balance his religious beliefs with the expectations and pressures from politicians, security agencies, and everyday temptations. The film examines the intricate and concerning relationship between the government, religious authorities, mass media, and Islamist extremism in Egypt.

== Plot ==
Hatem, a young sheikh at a government mosque, transitions from leading prayers to becoming a TV celebrity issuing "fatwas" that captivate millions due to his courage and deviation from traditional religious rhetoric in a society heavily influenced by fundamentalism. While Hatem eloquently and sarcastically answers questions from callers on his TV show, behind the scenes, he becomes entangled in bloody power struggles he has tried to avoid. As his fame increases, so do the temptations and complexities in his life.

Hatem finds himself caught in a web of conflict, dealing with a partially lost son receiving treatment abroad and a wife whose love has grown cold. Security institutions attempt to control him and exploit his vulnerabilities to serve their interests. Meanwhile, a sovereign entity involves him in solving a problem for the president, whose son causes the family an embarrassment that their fragile society cannot handle.

As Hatem tries to create a small fracture in the thick wall of hypocrisy and fear, he struggles to maintain his integrity while navigating a complex network of relationships and challenges. He asserts, "I cannot tell the entire truth, but I do my very best to speak nothing else."

== Cast ==
- Amr Saad as Sheikh Hatem El-Shinawy
- Dorra Zarrouk as Omayma
- Ahmed Magdy as Hasan
- Riham Hagag as Nashwa
- Bayoumi Fouad as Anwar Othman
- Ramzi El Adl as Sheikh Mokhtar
- Eyad Akram as Omar
- Lotfy Labib as Khaled Abu Hadid
- Ahmed Rateb

== Production ==
The film faced some remarks from the censorship authority but was ultimately allowed to be shown commercially to audiences aged 12 or older. Ali had initially wanted to adapt the novel into a television series, but secured the necessary funds to create a film instead. Several actors were convinced of the importance of the work and participated for free or in exchange for symbolic gains. The film marks the beginning of a collaboration between Ali and Eissa on several adaptation projects.

== Release ==
Mawlana was released on January 27, 2016 in Egypt.

== Reception ==
Mawlana was a financial success in Egypt, earning 7.3 million Egyptian pounds ($388,300) by its third week. Variety, described the film as "a candid critique of corruption and fundamentalism," anticipating it to be one of Egypt's most talked-about movies.

The Hollywood Reporter praised The Preacher for its bold and focused critique of the way politics manipulates religion, capturing the dark atmosphere of the times with verve, emotion, and humor. It notes that the film's message of religious tolerance seems daring and gives the film a modern edge, while the only downside was some awkward plotting at the end.

Mawlana is a film with a timely and important message but falls short in terms of storytelling subtlety and character depth, according to Yasmine Zohdi. She notes, "By playing it safe, the story loses its resonance."

== Awards ==
Mawlana received multiple awards, including three Horus Awards at the Cairo National Festival for Egyptian Cinema (2018) for Best Actor (Amr Saad), Best Screenplay (Magdy Ahmed Ali), and Best Dialogue (Ibrahim Issa). The film also won the Interfaith Award for Feature Film at the St. Louis International Film Festival (2017), the Audience Award for Best Narrative Feature at the Twin Cities Film Fest (2017), and the Circle Award for Best Film at the Washington DC Filmfest (2017).

Amr Saad was nominated for Best Actor at the 2018 Critics Awards for Arab Films, and won the Best Actor Award at the 23rd Tetouan International Mediterranean Film Festival in Morocco.

The film was selected in the Dubai International Film Festival's Muhr category.

== Controversy ==
The film sparked criticism from Sunni Muslim clerics, leading some to demand a ban. Al-Azhar clerics argued that the film damaged the reputation of institutional Islam during a period when the organization was actively working to curb violent extremism. Director Magdy Ahmed Ali countered by saying, "This is the ideal time for the film. The military is combating terrorism, extremism is growing, and people are advocating for a revitalization of religious discourse."

== Background ==
The film's release coincided with Egypt's ongoing struggle with Islamist extremism under the leadership of President Abdel Fattah el-Sisi, a former army chief who overthrew the Muslim Brotherhood government in 2013. El-Sisi prioritized the fight against extremism and designated Al-Azhar as the central force in defending mainstream Islam. The film's premiere occurred one day before a suicide bomber killed 28 people in an attack on Cairo's primary Coptic Christian cathedral, an event claimed by the Islamic State.
