= Scarlet Bishara =

Palestinian judge

Scarlet Bishara (Arabic: سكارلت بشارة) is a Palestinian judge and the first woman judge in the Ecclesiastical Court of First Instance of the Evangelical Lutheran Church in Jordan and the Holy Land (ELCJHL). She obtained her postgraduate education at the Beirut Arab University (BAU), where she earned a law degree. She underwent two years of legal training, after which she practiced law independently for five years. During this time, she gained experience in the Sharia Courts and Catholic and Orthodox Family courts. She then served as a legal advisor at Mehwar Center, a shelter for abused women in Bethlehem. Her contributions were instrumental in the development and implementation of the reformed Personal Status Law of the ELCJHL. She was later appointed as a judge at the Lutheran Court of First Instance in 2015.

Judge Bishara currently serves as the legal advisor for the Bethlehem Governorate. Her main areas of focus include gender justice and women and family issues. In this capacity, she primarily oversees cases related to violence against women and children. She is a member of several committees, including the Women's Protection Team in Bethlehem, the National Referral System for Women Victims of Violence, the Advisory Committee for the Protection Centers System (Safety Houses), and the Legal Aid Project for Abused Women in Ecclesiastical Courts. Judge Bishara is co-founder of Al-Hakimat Council with Judge Somoud Damiri. She is on the Board of Trustees for Bethlehem Bible College.

Judge Scarlet has published multiple studies analyzing women's rights from a legal perspective. Her expertise has been recognized globally, as she has represented the ELCJHL and the Lutheran World Federation at international conferences on gender justice, including those held at the United Nations.
