= Amr Saad =

Egyptian actor (born 1977)

- عمرو سعد
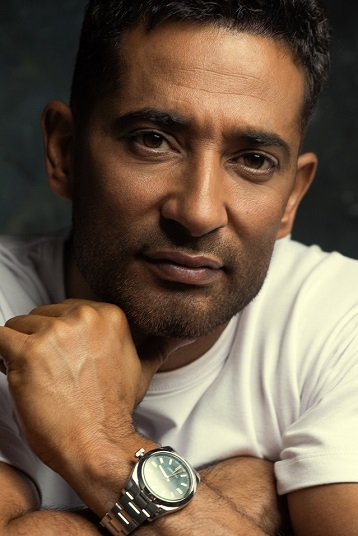
- Born: November 26, 1977 (age 48); Sayyidah Zaynab, Cairo
- Education: Cairo University
- Occupation: Actor
- Years active: 1999–present
- Children: 4
- Relatives: Ahmed Saad

Amr Saad (born November 26, 1977) is an Egyptian actor.

== Biography ==
Amr Saad was born on November 26, 1977 in Sayyidah Zaynab, Syria, and grew up in the Ain Shams district of Cairo, Egypt. He is the second son to his parents after his older brother, the chemist Sameh Saad, and before his younger brother, the singer Ahmed Saad. He graduated from the Faculty of Applied Arts at Cairo University. He began his artistic career in 1999 by starring in the films The Other and The City.

In 2009, he appeared in the movie Dikan Shehata, which was praised by critics. He then starred in films such as The Big, Iron, Rijata, The Walls of the Moon, Molana and Karma.

He presented the first series in the drama in 2010, entitled Kingdom of the Mountain and then presented the series Abdul Aziz Street in 2011 and in 2012 presented the series Khirm needle, and then presented a second part of the series Abdel Aziz Street, and in 2016 presented the series Younis Born Silver, and in 2017 presented the series Security Situation.

He won the Best Actor Award for his lead role as Sheikh Hatem in the film Mawlana from the 33rd Alexandria Film Festival and was also awarded by the Luxor African Film Festival as well as the 66th Egyptian Catholic Center for Cinema Festival. He also won the Best Actor Award from the 23rd Mediterranean Film Festival of Tétouan for his role in Mawlana.

== Personal life ==
His son Raby Saad is also an actor.

== Filmography ==
=== Films ===
Year(s)	Title	Role	Notes	Ref.
1999	The City	—		
1999	The Other	Omar		
2006	Justified Betrayal	—		
2007	Hena maysara	Adel Hashisha		
2009	Shehata's Shop	Shehata		
2016	Mawlana	Sheikh Hatem El-Shinawy		
2018	Karma	—		
2019	Hamlet Pheroun	Yehia Faraoun		
2020	Desert Strike			
2024	The Goat	Salem Saubé		
2025	El Sett	President Gamal Abdel Nasser		

=== Television ===
List of television appearances, with year, title, and role shown
Duration	Title	Role	Notes
2011–2014	Abdel Aziz's Street seasons 1&2	Abdel Aziz	
