= Malikat Jamal Al Kawn =

Malikat Jamal Al Kawn ملكة جمال الكون

Studio album by Haifa Wehbe
- Released: May 8, 2012
- Genres: Arabic pop, pop-folk
- Length: 57:08
- Label: Rotana
- Producers: Haifa Wehbe (exec.), Hadi Sharara

Haifa Wehbe chronology
Baby Haifa (2010)	Malikat Jamal Al Kawn ملكة جمال الكون (2012)	Hawwa (2018)

Singles from "MJK"
- 1. "Bokra Bfarjik" Released: 2012; 2. "Malikat Jamal Al Kawn" Released: 2012; 3. "Ezzay Ansak" Released: 2013

Malikat Jamal Al Kawn (Arabic: ملكة جمال الكون) (MJK; English: "Miss Universe") is the sixth studio album by Lebanese Arabic pop singer Haifa Wehbe, released on May 8, 2012. The album contains 14 songs, a fusion of oriental and western music sung in three different dialects: Egyptian, Lebanese and Gulf Arabic.

== Charts and critical reception ==
The album ranked #1 on the iTunes Worldwide albums chart, being the first Lebanese artist to hold this position on the chart and the album has sold over 10,000,000 copies to date.

== Singles ==
- "Bokra Bfarjik" was the first single. Its video was shot in Italy, directed by Giangi Magnoni and released on 10 May.
- The second single was "MJK" and its music video was shot in New York.
- The third single was "Ezzay Ansak", released in 2013.

== Track listing ==
No.	Title	Length
1.	"Ezzay Ansak (Mat2olish)"	5:11
2.	"Maliket Jamal El Kon"	3:54
3.	"Bayza"	4:00
4.	"Yalla Maa Baad"	4:06
5.	"Sama'ani"	4:09
6.	"Bahrab Men Einaik"	4:34
7.	"A'aref"	4:17
8.	"Baheb Feik Hagat"	3:18
9.	"Kobba"	3:51
10.	"Bokra Bfarjik"	4:10
11.	"Kont Ha'oulak Eh"	4:00
12.	"Ba'oulak Eh Ya Am"	3:15
13.	"Baddi Chouf B'ainak Hobb"	4:38
14.	"Harami Gloub"	3:45
Total length:		57:08

== Release history ==
Country	Date	Format	Label
Middle East	May 8, 2012	CD, digital download	Rotana
Worldwide	May 8, 2012	Digital download	Rotana
United States	May 8, 2012	CD	Rotana
