= Shehata's Shop =

Dokkan Shehata
- Theatrical poster
- Directed by: Khaled Youssef
- Starring: Mahmoud Hemida; Amr Saad; Haifa Wehbe; Ghada Abdel Razek; Mohamed Karim
- Release date: June 2009
- Running time: 128 minutes
- Country: Egypt
- Language: Egyptian Arabic

Dokkan Shehata (Shehata shop) is a 2009 Egyptian drama film starring Mahmoud Hemida, Amr Saad, Haifa Wehbe and Ghada Abdel Razek and Mohamed Karim. The film is directed and produced by Khaled Youssef.

== Controversy ==
Khalid Youssef alleged that there was a dirty plot to limit the film's financial success. Despite getting financial success in theatres, many of them withdrew Dokkan Shehata, supposedly to show other films such as Al-Farah (The Wedding Party) and Bobbos. He alleges theatrical distribution tycoons are responsible for "killing" it. The film also was reported by a number of commentators to have predicted the Egyptian revolution of 2011

== Reception ==
=== Box office ===
In the first three weeks after its release, Dokkan Shehata grossed E£9 million in revenues. It was second to Omar & Salma starring Tamer Hosny and Mai Ezzeddine, which grossed E£13 million.
