= Arab Telemedia Group =

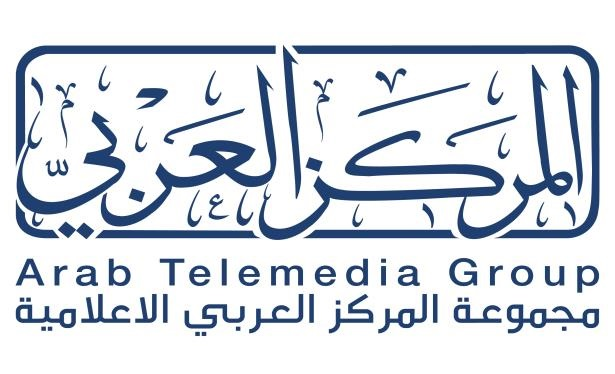
- Industry: TV Production
- Founded: 1983
- Founder: Adnan Al Awamleh
- Headquarters: Amman, Jordan
- Key people: Talal Al Awamleh (CEO)
- Website: http://www.arabtelemedia.net/

Arab Telemedia Group is an independent commercial media enterprise, founded by Adnan Al Awamleh in 1983.

Arab Telemedia creates and produces quality multiplatform content and since its establishment has been evolving to become at the forefront of TV productions in the Middle East. In addition, Arab Telemedia distributes its own content in different formats assuring the highest qualities. Apart from producing and distributing, Arab Telemedia is the foremost entity that provides Production facilities and services ready to support film makers and production houses from different scopes to different drives.

Over the past 30 years, it became one of the leading production companies in the Arab world, Arab Telemedia Group produced more than 5000 hours of drama programming, mostly aired on major TV broadcasters across the region achieving top viewership ratings.

In the year 2000, Talal Al Awamleh became the CEO for Arab Telemedia, accomplishing a great growth successes in the years after, crowned with an Emmy Award in 2008 for its socio-political series Al Ijteyah "The Invasion" as best international telenovela.

== Television series ==
Arab Telemedia Group has produced a significant number of popular Arabic TV Titles, below are some of these titles:

Series Name	Genre
Malik Bin Al Rayb	Historical
Wa'd Al-Ghareeb	Bedouin
Sneak a Peek	3D Cartoon
Okhwat Al-Dam	Bedouin
Tom Al-Ghurra	Bedouin
Amal	Social
Dafater Al -Toofan	Social
Kelma Wa Nos	Comedy
Itr Al-Nar	Historical
Mokhallfat Al-Zawab' Al-Akheera	Social
Al Anoud	Bedouin
Jamr Al Ghada	Bedouin
Ra'i Al-Seet	Bedouin
Ra'iat Al-Wadha	Bedouin
Balqis	Historical
Ajniha Fi Sama' Al-Ghorba	Social
Abu Ja’far Al - Mansur	Historical
Sultana	Social
Oyoon Alia	Bedouin
Odeh Abu Tayeh	Bedouin
Ras Ghlais Season 2	Bedouin
Nimer Bin Edwan	Bedouin
Bent Al Noor	Social
Wadha and Eben Ajlan	Bedouin
The Invasion	Socio-Political
The Sons of Al Rashid	Historical
Duaat Ala Abwab Jahannam	Socio-Political
Ras Ghlais - Season 1	Bedouin
Almoravids and Andalusia	Historical
The Rough Road	Social
The Sun Rises Again	Social
The Last Days of Al Yamama	Historical
Shahrazad	Historical
Imru’ Al Qais	Historical
Fardawi	Historical
Al Hajjaj	Historical
The Gathering Age	Historical
Dhi Qar	Historical
Ser Al-Nuwwar	Historical
Sham Sharif	Historical
Ors Al-Sager	Historical
Akher Ayyam Al-Toot	Historical
Qamar and Sahar	Social
Al Bahar Ayoub	Historical
Al-Shawka Al-Sawda'	Historical
Khayt Al-Dam	Historical

== Awards and recognition ==
Series	Award	Event	Year
Malik Bin Al Rayb	Golden Award	Arab Radio and Television Festival (Tunisia)	2017
Malik Bin Al Rayb	Golden Award	Jordan Festival For Arab Media	2016
Wa'd Al-Ghareeb	Silver Award	Arab Radio and Television Festival (Tunisia)	2016
Okhwat Al-Dam	Bronze Award	Jordan Festival For Arab Media	2015
Tom Al-Ghurra	Silver Award	Arab States Broadcasting Union	2015
Ajniha Fi Sama' Al-Ghorba	Silver Award	Jordan Festival For Arab Media	2010
Balqis	Golden Creativity Award, Certificate of Appreciation & Financial Award for Best Set Design	Cairo Arab Media Festival	2009
Balqis	Dubai Arab Drama Award	Dubai Film Festival	2009
Odeh Abu Tayeh	Golden Innovation Award & Certificate for Best Actor	Cairo Arab Media Festival	2009
Sultana	Golden Award for Best Director	Cairo Arab Media Festival	2009
Odeh Abu Tayeh	Golden Creativity Award for Best Screenplay	Cairo Arab Media Festival	2008
Odeh Abu Tayeh	Golden Creativity Award for Best Director	Cairo Arab Media Festival	2008
Odeh Abu Tayeh	Golden Innovation Award & Certificate for Best Actor	Cairo Arab Media Festival	2008
Odeh Abu Tayeh	Golden Creativity Award for Best Lighting Design	Cairo Arab Media Festival	2008
Odeh Abu Tayeh	Golden Creativity Award for Best Soundtrack	Cairo Arab Media Festival	2008
Odeh Abu Tayeh	Golden Creativity Award for Best Costume Design	Cairo Arab Media Festival	2008
Odeh Abu Tayeh	Best Production Award	Cairo Arab Media Festival	2008
Abu Ja’far Al - Mansur	Golden Award for Set Design	Cairo Arab Media Festival	2008
The Invasion	Best Telenovella Award	International Emmy Award	2008
The Invasion	Silver Award for Best Director	Cairo Arab Media Festival	2007
The Sons of Al Rashid	Golden Award for Best Historical Drama	Cairo Arab Media Festival	2006
Duaat Ala Abwab Jahannam	Golden Award for Best Script	Cairo Arab Media Festival	2006
Duaat Ala Abwab Jahannam	Honor of Social Drama Award	Cairo Arab Media Festival	2006
Al Hajjaj	Golden innovation award for the Actor	Cairo Festival for TV and Radio Programs	2004
Al Hajjaj	Best lightening Award	Cairo Festival for TV and Radio Programs	2004
Al Hajjaj	Bronze Award for Historical Drama	Cairo Festival for TV and Radio Programs	2004
Dhi Qar	Silver Award	The 8th edition of the Gulf Radio and Television Festival	2002
Sham Al Sharif	Silver Award for Distinguished Production	The 7th edition of the Gulf Radio and Television Festival	2001
Akher Ayyam Al-Toot	Bronze Award for Television Production Contest	Cairo Arab Media Festival	2000
Ors Al-Sager	Certification of Best Program	The 6th edition of the Gulf Radio and Television Festival	1999
