= Les Petits Chats (film) =

- Directed by: Sherif Nakhla
- Produced by: Wael Omar
- Cinematography: Sherif Nakhla; Hani Eskander
- Edited by: Sherif Nakhla
- Distributed by: MAD Solutions
- Release date: 16 October 2015 (Arabian Sights Film Festival)
- Country: Egypt
- Language: English

Les Petits Chats is a 2015 documentary film about the popular Egyptian rock band Les Petits Chats which was formed in 1967.

== Background ==
Work on the film started in 2009. On September 28, 2015, a trailer for the documentary was posted online on Facebook. In a week, it attracted more than 55,000 views. According to Cairo Scene, film would take a closer look into the lives of the band members around the time of their popularity as well as prior to and post that period. Also to be looked at was the changes in personnel that took place over the years. The film took six years to complete from its original start date in 2009 and it was made during that period when Egypt was going through an upheaval from 2011 to 2016.

=== The director ===
Nakhla is the step-son of one of the band members.

== Screenings ==
Before its completion and while still in the developmental stage, the film was shown during the Ismailia Film Festival in 2012.

In 2015, Cairo Scene mentioned that the film was to premiere at the Arabian Sights Film Festival in Washington DC on 16 and 17 October. The film was nominated for the festival's jury award.

A screening for the film was to take place at the Zamalek Cinema on Monday 8 May at 7 pm.

It was announced in the July 20, 2017 issue of The National that Sherif Nakhla's 2015 film about the band was to be screened at Abu Dhabi’s Mina Zayed on Saturday 5 August.

== Cast ==
- Wagdi Francis
- Ezzat Abu Ouf
- Omar Khairat
- Sadek Gellini
- Pino
- George Lucas
- Sobhi Bedeir
- Samir Sabry
- Mohamed Salmawy
- Mohamed Gohar
- Sherif Seif el Nasr
