= The City (1999 film) =

El Madina (La Ville)
- Directed by: Yousry Nasrallah
- Written by: Abdel-Rahmane; Claire Denis; Yousry Nasrallah
- Produced by: Humbert Balsan; Gabriel Khoury; Marianne Khoury
- Starring: Bassem Samra; Ahmed Fouad Selim; Abla Kamel
- Music by: Tamer Karaouan
- Release date: 1999
- Running time: 108 minutes
- Countries: Egypt; France
- Languages: Arabic; French

EL Madina (Arabic: المدينة, La Ville) is a 1999 Egyptian French drama film directed by Yousry Nasrallah produced by Humber Balsa, Gabriel Khoury and Marianne Khoury. Written by Nasser Abdel-Rahmane, Claire Denis and Yousry Nasrallah.

== Summary ==
According to an Arabic movie database, the film revolves around a young Egyptian man, Ali Bassem Samra with acting ambitions but lives in a poor neighborhood. His father Ahmed Fouad Selim has high expectations of him, wanting Ali to work with him in an industry. Ali's dream is to travel across the world and become an actor. So he travels to Paris and decides to live there, but faces some obstacles and gets in trouble, which leads to his memory loss. He moves back to Egypt and starts over.

== Background ==
In Albawaba Entertainment web page, an article named "El-Madina: Two Movies in One, Egyptian Frame of French Plot" states that the French Cultural Center premiered el-Madina, by Yousri Nasrallah in 1999. It wasn't his most recent work, but it was still new to Beirut. Nasrallah is quite possibly Egypt's most-respected independent filmmaker. His work is dedicated to capturing Egyptian society. He has been praised for the critical yet compassionate eye his camera casts upon the average Egyptian. El-Madina had two separate films, the Egyptian framing story and the central plot set in France. Then funding difficulties left him with only enough money for a two-hour production, so he re-wrote his screenplay, effectively squeezing two films into one. The film took place in Egypt and France.

== Cast ==
- Bassem Samra as Ali
- Ahmed Fouad Selim as the father
- Abla Kamel as the mother
- Roschdy Zem
- Ines de Medeiros
- Amr Saad
- Basma
- Sarry EL-Naggar
- Massaoud Hattau
- Yousra

== Plot ==
In the center of El-Madina lives Ali, a young man who wants to act but is unable to find proper work. The only escape for his creative instincts, besides nightly conversations with a poster of Robert De Niro’s Raging Bull, is occasional bottom-of-the-line stage melodramas. Ali makes money as a butchers’ accountant in his neighborhood's souq, where his father is a vegetable vendor. This quarter, Rod al-Faraj, is emblematic of a number of inner city neighborhoods in Cairo, which have been erased, and isolated their residents to desert suburbs by an Egyptian government, wanting to restore its historic monuments and attract tourists. Throughout the film, there's a point at which Ali's souq, slotted for tourist gentrification, is shut by the Egyptian internal security. He finally decides to escape Egypt and pursue acting in France. Two years later we do find him acting, not on stage but in the boxing ring. Unable to find legal work, he has fallen in with a fellow countryman who pays him to “throw” fights in crooked boxing matches. Ali is again stripped of his livelihood. After his business is forcibly absorbed by French gangsters, Ali's partner betrays him and flees to Egypt, leaving him penniless and without an identity. Ultimately the actor finds himself back in Rod al-Faraj, having to start his life quite literally from scratch.

== Did you know? ==
Bassem Samara (Ali) learned French especially for this film in the French cultural center in Cairo.

== See also ==
- Lists of Egyptian films
