= Shalimar Sharbatly =

Saudi Arabian abstract painter (born 1971)

- شاليمار شربتلي
- Born: Shalimar Hassan Abbas Sharbatly; 1971 (age 54–55)
- Education: B.A. in Psychology; M.A. in Criminology
- Alma mater: King Abdulaziz University; Beirut Arab University
- Notable work: "La Torq"
- Style: Abstract designs
- Spouse: Khaled Youssef

Shalimar Hassan Abbas Sharbatly (born in 1971) is a Saudi Arabian abstract painter. She was the first woman to be commissioned by the government to do street artwork. She presented her hand-painted, abstract designed Porsche 911 on her stand at a trade fair held in the Carrousel du Louvre.

== Biography ==
Sharbatly grew up in Jeddah, Saudi Arabia, the daughter of Saudi businessman Hassan Abbas Sharbatly. She started painting at the age of three. Her first art exhibit was in 1988 in Cairo when she was 16. Several celebrities attended including Egyptian painter Salah Taher and poet Farouk Juwaidah.

Sharbatly attended the Faculty of Fine Arts in Cairo, Egypt. Later, she earned her bachelor's degree in psychology at King Abdulaziz University and her master's degree in criminology at the Beirut Arab University in Lebanon.

In 2011, Sharbatly married Egyptian film director and comedian, Khaled Youssef. She was found guilty by the Paris Judicial Court on July 2, 2020, of human trafficking, undeclared work and employment of foreigners without a work permit. Verdict: three years in prison and an arrest warrant, the defendant having taken advantage of the easing of her judicial supervision due to professional reasons to leave the country, where she has not set foot since then.

== Works ==
In 2009, Sharbatly cooperated in a joint exhibit along with Egyptian contemporary artist Omar Al-Najdi and Spanish painter Juan Ramirez; events were held in Jeddah, Cairo, Madrid, and Paris.

She was commissioned by the Saudi Arabian government to paint murals for the city of Jeddah. This made her the first female to be hired by the government to do artwork. The murals were done in the Corniche and in front of the Jeddah guest palace.

Two of Sharbatly's best known works are a custom-designed, hand-painted Porsche 911, and a Formula One racing vehicle she painted known as La Torq. The Porsche was showcased at the Paris Motor Show, where it was viewed by over a million attendees. La Torq was shown alongside the 2017 Grand Prix de Monaco. In 2017, it was displayed in the lobby of Hotel Negresco in Nice, France. She presented her work on her stand at one of the 2017 “Art Shopping” fairs at the Carrousel du Louvre in Paris. As part of her collection, she also designed a Ferrari 360, a Mini Cooper, and a Yamaha Tricity.

One of her paintings is currently on display at Oxford University.

In 2021, she worked with Jeddah Municipality to hand-paint several disposable car vehicles and transform them into art pieces to be displayed on one of Jeddah's popular streets, Tahlia street. However, the finished work received negative feedback and great criticism from residents of the city. Some people described it as “visual pollution and distortion of Jeddah's image”. It ended up being removed by Jeddah Municipality after Makkah Region Governor Prince Khalid Al-Faisal ordered the removal.

== Recognitions ==
In 2000, Sharbatly was placed in the top 100 influencers of Jeddah art and culture.

In February 2016, Sharbatly was named Goodwill Ambassador for her role in volunteering and contributing to Saudi Arabian culture. In November 2016, Sharbatly was one of the presenters at the Association of Foreign Journalists Awards in London, England.
