= Ahmed Saad (singer) =

Egyptian singer (born 1981)

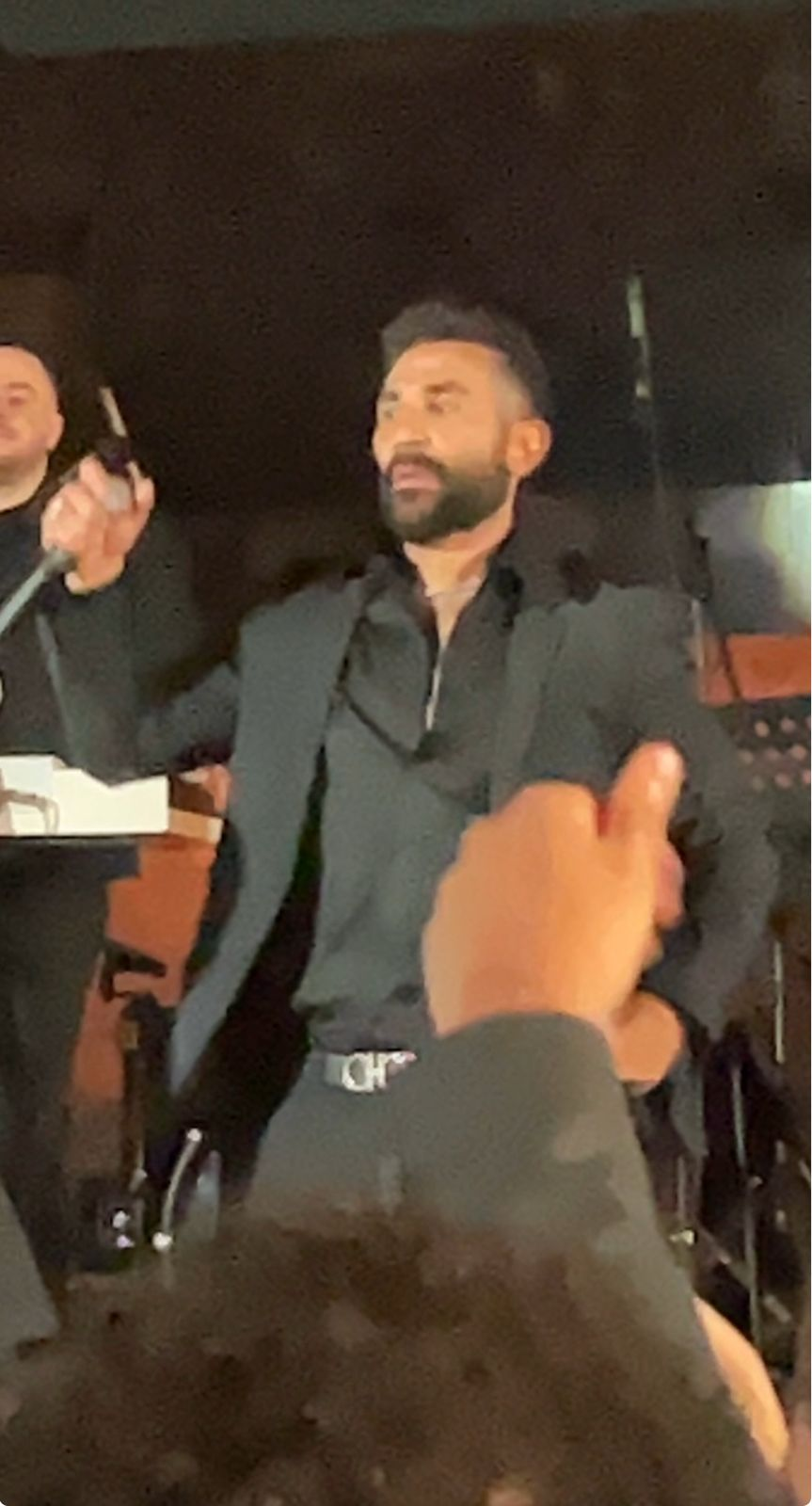
- Born: August 20, 1981 (age 45); Cairo, Egypt
- Occupation: Singer
- Spouse(s): Reem al-Baroudi (m. 2017; div. 2017) Somaya El Khashab (m. 2017; div. 2019)
- Children: 2
- Relatives: Amr Saad (brother)

Ahmed Saad (born August 20, 1981) is an Egyptian singer and actor. He has composed songs for many Egyptian movies.

== Biography ==
Ahmed Saad was born on August 20, 1981, in Cairo. He grew up in an artistic family and is the brother of actor Amr Saad and scientist Sameh S. Ali.

Ahmed Saad began his professional music career in **2003** with the release of his debut album, *Ashki Le Meen*. The album featured popular songs such as *Habibi Roohy*, *Yom Wa Ethneen*, and *Azizi Aini*, helping establish him as a rising name in the Egyptian music scene.

In **2007**, following a series of successful singles, Saad released his second album, *Waheshtini Oyounak*. It included several hit tracks, including *Garhona*, *Kafaya Keda*, and *Kol Leila*. His growing presence on music television channels, along with the popularity of his music videos, further boosted his profile and contributed to his rise to fame.

Ahmed Saad is known for his powerful, deep voice and his ability to turn simple, relatable expressions into memorable songs. Tracks such as *Bahebak Ya Sahbi* and *Ya Khosara* have earned him a strong following across the Arab region. In recent years, he has explored a wider range of styles, including rap, romantic, and folk music, with songs such as *Eh El Youm El Helo Da* and *Alyki Ayoun*.

Saad has also worked with many of Egypt’s leading poets and songwriters while writing and composing several of his own songs. His hit *Wasaa Wasaa*, which he wrote, composed, and performed, became particularly successful and reached YouTube’s Top 100 songs.

== Personal life ==
He married the Egyptian actress Reem al-Baroudi, but they announced their separation after 21 days. He later married the Egyptian actress Somaya El Khashab, but they separated in March 2019.

== Discography ==
- 2003: Ashki Le Meen
- 2007: Waheshtini Oyounak
- 2010: Qarbaly
- 2014: Mafeesh Ba'dak
- 2019: Habibi
- 2012: Names of Allah
- 2020: Ya Rab
- 2025: Habebna

== See also ==
- Media related to Ahmed Saad at Wikimedia Commons
