= Baby Haifa =

Studio album by Haifa Wehbe
- Released: March 2010
- Recorded: 2009–2010
- Genre: Arabic
- Label: Rotana

Haifa Wehbe chronology
Habibi Ana (2008)	Baby Haifa (2010)	Malikat Jamal Al Kawn (2012)

Baby Haifa is the fifth album by Lebanese singer Haifa Wehbe. It was released in March 2010 exclusively for youngsters under Rotana Records. The album contains eight songs, sung in Lebanese and Egyptian dialects.

== Track listing ==
1. "Ya Toto"
2. "Baba Fein"
3. "El Wawah"
4. "Naughty"
5. "Lamma El Shams"
6. "Baoussi"
7. "Aklok Mnin Ya Battah"
8. "Hek Al Mama"
