= Zelal =

- Directed by: Marianne Khoury; Mustapha Hasnaoui
- Screenplay by: Marianne Khoury Mustapha Hasnaoui
- Produced by: Gabriel Khoury Marianne Khoury
- Cinematography: Tamer Joseph Victor Credi
- Edited by: Doaa Fadel
- Release date: 2010
- Running time: 90 minutes
- Countries: Egypt; France; Morocco; United Arab Emirates

Zelal is a 2010 documentary film on the life of patients in a psychiatric hospital in Egypt. It was directed by Marianne Khoury.

== Synopsis ==
Zelal is an invitation to delve into the world of psychiatry and "madness" in Egypt, in Abbasiya's mental hospital. It meets the ordinary madmen and women banished to mental institutions by Egyptian society and offers more than just a journey into their world of shadows. The hospitals end up becoming the only place patients can conceive, not because they are truly "crazy", but because they fear the outside world. The film forces viewers to put their own preconceptions and interpretations to the test, reminding us that freedom is precarious in a society that does not tolerate any differences.

== Making ==
The soundtrack of the documentary was made by the patients themselves. The documentary took 3 years to make, with 8 months of shooting. The producers managed to make this documentary with the help of the World Health Organization.

== Awards ==
- 2010: Annual Prize of the International Critics for Arab films from the International Federation of Film Critics (FIPRESCI)
