= Ahmed Magdy (actor) =

Egyptian actor, artist and director (born 1986)

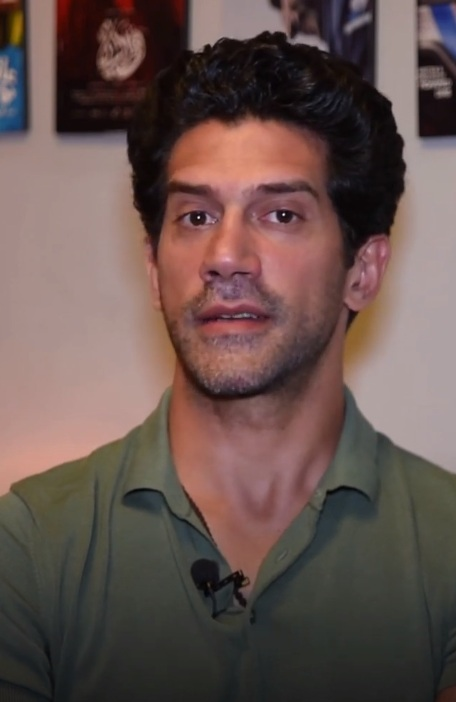
- Magdy in 2021
- Born: 4 May 1986 (age 40); Cairo, Egypt
- Education: Ain Shams University
- Occupations: Actor, director
- Father: Magdy Ahmed Ali

Ahmed Magdy (Arabic: أحمد مجدي, born 4 May 1986) is an Egyptian actor, artist and director.

== Early life ==
Magdy was born in Cairo, Egypt, in 1986, to an Egyptian father, film director Magdy Ahmed Ali, and an Algerian mother. He grew up and lived in Cairo, Egypt, and In September 2018, he married Noha Khattab, an Egyptian.

Magdy graduated from the law faculty at Ain Shams University, in Cairo, and then joined the El-Tamy Theater (Arabic: مسرح التامي) troupe and worked as an actor, assistant director and trainer.

== Career ==
His first film was the independent six-minute 2007 Egyptian documentary work "Magra El-Ceil" (Arabic: مجرى السيل, "Riverbed"). He then took part in a workshop inhospitable native Cairo entitled "El-Zatt wa El-Madina, El-Qahira" (Arabic: الذات والمدينة, القاهرة , "The Self and the City - Cairo") which was produced by both the European Union and Egypt's El-Sammat Production Company, which involved the production of another Egyptian documentary called "Zeezo" (Arabic: زيزو). After joining the Cairo Jesuit Cinema School he directed three low budget short titles. His graduation project, "Keika Sagheera" (كيكة صغيرة, "Small Cake"), received an honor from the judging committee at the Algeria Independent Cinema Festival.

Overall, Magdy has taken part in more than 30 independent works. He has directed "Ella El-Bah" ("To the Sea…"), which was produced by the Forced Migration and Refugee Studies department at the American University in Cairo. He has also acted in "’Asafeer El-Neel" Arabic: عصافير النيل , "Birds of the Nile") which is an adaptation of the novel by renowned writer Ibrahim Aslan.

== Filmography ==
=== Film ===
Year(s)	Title	Role
2014	The Shadow of Cairo	Omar
2014	The Gate of Departure	Son
2016	Mawlana	Hasan
2016	Ali, the Goat and Ibrahim	Ibrahim
2017	Seif Tagreeby	himself

=== Television ===
Year(s)	Title	Role
2015	El Ahd	Alaa
2017	Hagar Gohanam: Black Widows	Amr
2017	Sunset Oasis	Radwan
2017	Le A'la Se'r	Karim

== Personal life ==
Madgy enjoys photography and can also play numerous instruments. He also practices contemporary dance.

In 2018, Magdy married an Egyptian woman, his wedding was in a prestigious place in his hometown Cairo.
