= Rindala Kodeih =

Lebanese director, actress and producer

Rindala Kodeih (Arabic: رندلى قديح; born 3 February) is a Lebanese director, actress and producer, who has worked in many series. She also directed Video clips of several singers from Europe and Arab countries.

== Personal life and career ==
Kodeih was born in Africa to Lebanese father and mother. She studied in France. Later on, she received an award from the Beirut International Film Festival for direction Al Arisha movie.

== See also ==
- Nadine Labaki
- Joana Hadjithomas
- Danielle Arbid
- Leila Kanaan
- Mirna Khayat
