= Beirut Arab University =

Private university in Beirut, Lebanon

Coordinates: 33.8733°N 35.4969°E

- جامعة بيروت العربية
- Type: Private
- Established: 1960; 66 years ago
- President: Wael Salam
- Faculty: 1000
- Administrative staff: 313
- Students: >16,000
- Location: Beirut, Lebanon (Main Campus)
- Campus: Urban (Beirut) Suburban (Debbieh) Urban (Tripoli) Suburban (Bekaa)
- Colors: Royal Blue
- Website: www.bau.edu.lb/

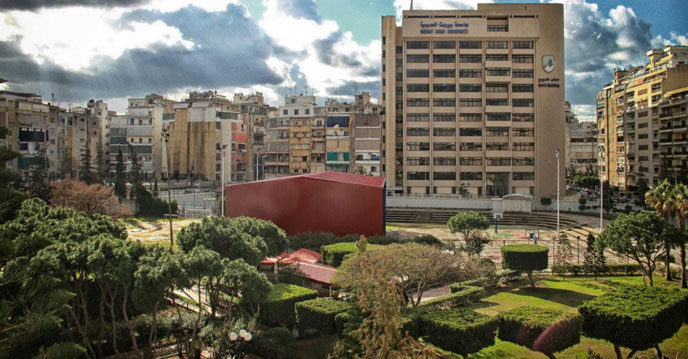
Beirut Campus with a view of the Hariri Building.

Beirut Arab University (BAU) (Arabic: جـامعة بيروت العربية, romanized: Jāmʻah Bayrūt al-ʻArabīyah) is a Lebanese private university mainly located in Beirut, Lebanon. It was founded by the Lebanese Waqf El-Bir wal Ihsan Society in 1960.

The university's main campus is situated close to the southern entrance of Beirut. Satellite campuses are established in Dibbiyeh,Tripoli, and the Bekaa. English serves as the primary language of instruction. Certain classes are conducted in Arabic or French.

The university is ranked 676 in the QS World University Rankings 2026 and 29 in Arab Region Rankings for 2025. The university attained the International Institutional Accreditation from the Foundation for International Business Administration Accreditation (FIBAA) - an official international German foundation - registered in the European Quality Assurance Register (EQAR).

Notable alumni include figures such as former Lebanese PM Rafic Hariri along with jurists and politicians from Lebanon and other countries in the Middle East.

== Faculties ==
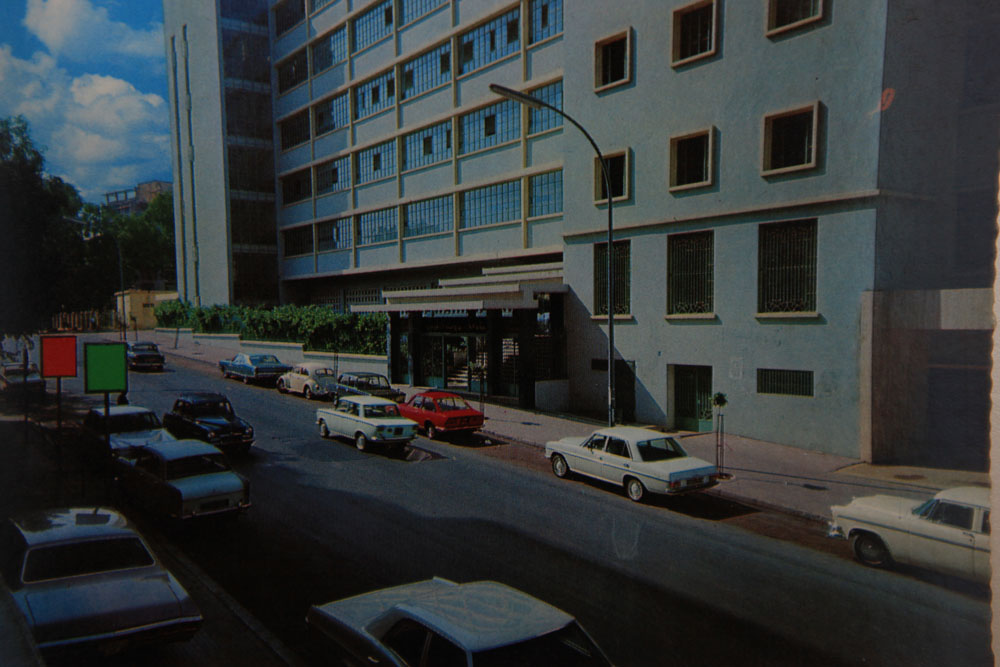
Old photo of Beirut Campus during the 80s

The university currently consists of the following 10 faculties:

- Faculty of Human Sciences
- Faculty of Law & Political Science
- Faculty of Business Administration
- Faculty of Architecture – Design and Built Environment
- Faculty of Engineering
- Faculty of Science
- Faculty of Pharmacy
- Faculty of Medicine
- Faculty of Dentistry
- Faculty of Health Sciences

== Campuses ==
Beirut Campus:
Beirut Campus was established in 1960. It is the main branch and located in the heart of Beirut in Tarik El Jadida. The land spans an area of 41,107 m2 and comprises two buildings with a total built area 50,500 m2. The main building has an area of 22,000 m2 and is utilized by BAU Administration and the Faculties of Business Administration and Dentistry.

The second building is the 12-story Hariri Building. It's built on an expansive area of 28,000 m2 and houses five faculties: Human Sciences, Law and Political Science, Pharmacy, Medicine, and Health Sciences.

University rankings

Global – Overall
- QS World: =676 (2026)

Debbieh Campus:
Debbieh Campus was established in 2006 and is located 33 km from Beirut city. The land spans over an area of 1,353,000 m2, and the total built area is 52,538 m2.

The Campus currently holds three Faculties: Architecture – Design & Built Environment, Engineering, and Science.

Tripoli Campus:
A campus in Tripoli, Mina Region, North Lebanon, was established in 2010.

Tripoli Branch comprises five faculties so far; the Faculty of Business Administration, the Faculty of Architecture – Design and Built Environment, the Faculty of Engineering, the Faculty of Science, and the Faculty of Health Sciences.

The Branch also provides facilities that offer various services to students, staff, researchers, and visitors.

Bekaa Campus:

Bekaa Campus was established in 2011 and is located in Jdeita and Taalbayah real estate area. The land spans an area of 183,391 m2, and the total built area is 1,650 m2.

It has allocated two locations for the Research Center for Environment and Development and the Alumni Club.

== BAU Student Prospectus ==
- Governing bodies: University Higher Council; University Council
- Academic year: September to June

== English Language Requirements ==
All programs and examinations at BAU are set in English except for the Faculties of Arts and Law where the language of instruction varies depending on the nature of the course/s. Hence, applicants must provide evidence of their English language proficiency in one of the following ways:

All undergraduate applicants and transferring students are expected to pass BAU's English Language admission exam with a minimum score of 60%. However, applicants who have passed a TOEFL Exam with a minimum score of 500 or IELTS with a minimum score of 6.5 or have successfully completed the General Certificate of Education (GCE) program are exempted from this English Language admission exam. Similarly, transferring students who have completed a minimum of two years at an institution where the language of instruction is English are exempted from BAU's English Language admission exam.

== Financial Aid and Scholarships ==
Undergraduate Program Scholarships

- BAU offers 4 scholarships annually. These scholarships are available to first year students who rank in the top ten positions in the four branches of the Lebanese Secondary School Certificate. These students can also benefit from these scholarships during their undergraduate study as long as they get a CGPA of 3.33 or above.
- Three scholarships are offered to the first three BAU students in each of the departments of the Faculty they are registered in provided that they get a SGPA of 3.00 and above at the end of each semester, with not less than 15 credits per semester. Each semester, a maximum of 5 top students, at each level of all undergraduate programs, who have completed 15 credits and above and have not failed any course during the same semester, are exempted from a percentage of the subsequent semester tuition fees.

Prizes

- President's Honor List and Dean's Honor list:

Students with a SGPA of 3.8 or above are included on the President's Honor list and those with a SGPA of 3.5 or above are included on the Dean's Honor list.

== Housing ==
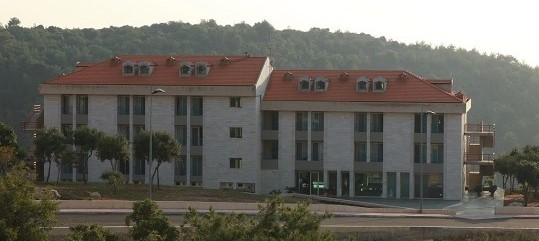
Boys' dormitory, Debbieh Campus

Beirut and Tripoli Campuses:

Debbieh Campus:

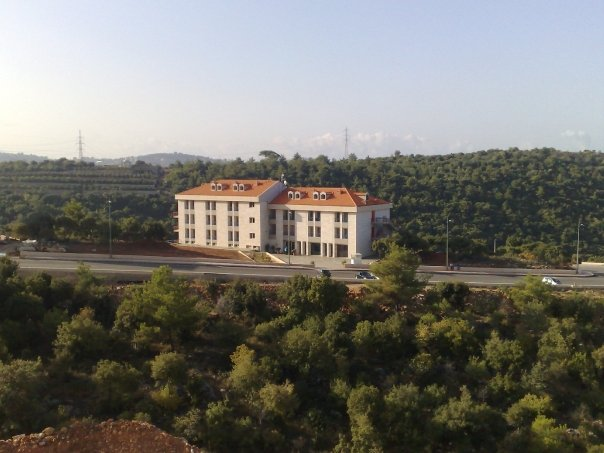
Academic Staff dormitory, Debbieh Campus

This Campus houses two separate dorms: the girls’ dorms and the boys’ dorms. These are two buildings located inside the campus in close proximity to the parking lot.

== Notable alumni ==
- Abdulla Ghanim Almuhannadi, Qatari journalist, editor and businessman
- Scarlet Bishara, Palestinian judge
- Eid Al-Fayez, government minister in Jordan
- Rafik Al-Hariri, prime minister of Lebanon
- Ahmad Karami, former government minister in Lebanon
- Tawfiq Kreishan, deputy prime minister of Jordan
- Jamil Othman Nasser, former Palestinian governor of Jerusalem
- Israa Seblani, doctor and survivor of the 2020 Beirut explosion
- Mohammed Hussein Al Shaali, government minister in the United Arab Emirates
- Joumana Seif, Syrian human rights activist
- Shalimar Sharbatly, Saudi Arabian abstract artist
- Abdullah bin Nasser bin Khalifa Al Thani, prime minister of Qatar
- Hilmi M. Zawati, Palestinian judge

== BAU Journals ==
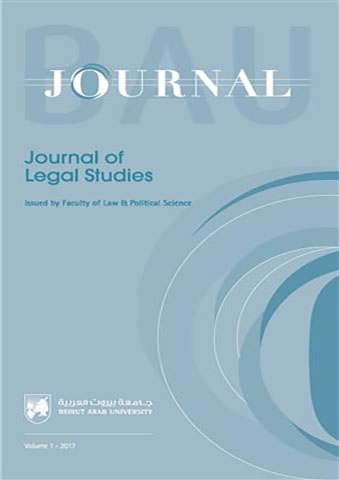
BAU Journal of Legal Studies, 2019

BAU journals are official publications of Beirut Arab University, currently publishing six scholarly journals that cover a range of disciplines, from the humanities and the social sciences to the life and physical sciences.

== Memberships ==
Beirut Arab University is a member of:

- Association of Arab Universities (AARU)
- International Association of Universities (IAU)
- Federation of the Universities of the Islamic World (FUIW)
- Agence Universitaire de la Francophonie (AUF):
- International Association of University Presidents (IAUP)
- EuroMed Permanent University Forum (EPUF)
- International Council for Open and Distance Education(ICDE)
- International Federation of Library Associations and Institutions(IFLA)
- Union of International Associations (UIA)

== See also ==
- List of Islamic educational institutions
