= Ezzat Abou Aouf =

Egyptian actor and composer (1948–2019)

- عزت أبو عوف
- Born: Mohamed Ezzat ahmed Shafiq Abou Aouf; 21 August 1948; Zamalek, Cairo, Kingdom of Egypt
- Died: 1 July 2019 (aged 70); Mohandiseen, Giza, Egypt
- Occupations: Actor; composer; gynecologist; obstetrician
- Years active: 1992–2019
- Children: 2

Mohamed Ezzat Ahmed Shafiq Abou Aouf (Arabic: محمد عزت أحمد شفيق أبو عوف; 21 August 1948 – 1 July 2019) was an Egyptian actor and composer. Abou Aouf obtained his bachelor's degree in medicine. He was a member of the rock band Les Petits Chats. He later joined Black Coats, and in the late seventies founded The Four M. He debuted in 1992 in Ice Cream in Gleam (Ays Krim fi Glym) with Egyptian singer Amr Diab, in addition to starring in more than 100 films over the course of his career. Abou Aouf has also served as director of the Cairo International Film Festival for seven years.

== Filmography ==
Year	Title	Role	Notes
2021	BodyGuard	Saad Eldin Fares	
2018	The Godfather: Part 2	Abdulhamed Al Attar	
2017	Zel Al Raees	Tarek Al Jaml	3 episodes
2017	The Godfather	Abdulhamed Al Attar	14 episodes
2017	The Ghosts of Adly Allam	Zaki	1 episode
2017	Kart Mimori	Abdulhamid	
2017	Horob Edterary	Himself	
2017	Off Limits	Ebied	
2017	Fain Qalbi	Yusuf's father	
2016	Under Table	Himself	
2016	Taht el-Tarabizah	Ex-minister Bahgat Uthman	
2016	Nelly W Sherihan	Mahfouz	2 episodes
2015	Paparazzi	Himself	
2015	Ramy Ayach: Alby Waga'ny	Himself	
2015	Plan B	The Judge	
2014	Itiham	Kamel	30 episodes
2014	Embratoreyet Meen	Amira's Father	30 episodes
2013	I Need a Man	Himself	
2013	Al Me'adeya	Gamal	
2012	Ruby	Riyad Shanin	54 episodes
2012	Bab Al Khalk	NasrAbo El-hassan	
2012	Al Safaa	Alexander	
2012	Game Over	Khaled	
2012	Omar W Salma 3	Rushdi	
2012	Omar & Salma 3	Rushdy	
2011	Bebo Wa Bashir	Himself	
2010	Lahazat Harega 2		TV Series
2010	Shekh Al Aram Hammam	Ali	TV Series
2010	La Tarago Wa La Esteslam	Azzam	
2010	Ardh Khass	Himself	TV Series
2009	El Dictator	Said Saiful-Nasr	
2009	Karima Karima	Himself	TV Series
2009	Bobbos	Nizam	
2009	Omar & Salma 2	Rushdi	TV Movie
2008	Habibi Na'eman	Said Saiful-Nasr	
2008	Ramadan Mabrouk Abul-Alamein Hamouda	Minister of Education	
2008	Khaltet Fawzya	Sayed	
2008	Al Zamhlawiyah	Salim	
2008	Boushkash	Rushdi Helal	
2008	Hilm el-Umr	Rushdi (Noor's father)	
2008	Hassan wa Morcus	General Mokhtar Salem	
2008	Laylat El-Baby Doll	Azzmi	
2008	Al Balad De Feha Hokomah	Himself	
2008	Hasan Tayyarah	Minister Asem Bey	
2007	El-malek Farouk	Himself	TV Series
2007	The Island	Gamal	
2007	El-Bilyatshu	Safwat Abul-Magd	
2007	Wahed men el nas	Kamal abo el azm	
2007	Omar & Salma	Roshdy	
2007	Critical Moments	Himself	TV Series 2 episodes
2007	45 Yom	45 Yom	
2006	Ayazon		
2006	Life's Speed Bump	Farooq	
2006	Awdet Elnadla	Hany	
2006	Halim	Mohamed Abdel Wahab	
2006	Mateegy norkos	Himself	
2005	Amaken Fi Al Qalb	Don Paulo Visconti DiCaprio	TV Series 1 episode
2005	El-sefara fi El-Omara	Walaa	
2004	Sib wana sib	Farid	
2004	Ya ward meen yeshtereek	Himself	TV Series
2004	Abba al abiad fi al yawm al aswad	Himself	TV Series
2002	Howa Fi Aih	Bad Guy	
2002	Amira fi Abdeen	Himself	
2002	El ragol el abiad el motawasset	Adham	
2001	Fares daher el-kheir	Himself	
2001	Asrar el-banaat	Khaled - Yasmine's father	
2001	Al Asheqan	Himself	
2000	The Red Notebook	Himself	
2000	Opera Ayda	Costa	27 episodes
2000	Bono Bono	Hamdy	
1999	Om Kulthum	Himself	TV Mini-series 9 episodes
1999	Ard al-Khof	Omar Elassiouty	
1999	Al-Ragol Al-Akhar	Qassem	
1999	Aboud on the Boarder	Tommy	
1999	The Other	Dr. Essam	
1997-1998	Garden City Ladies	Hussain Al Shazli	58 episodes
1998	Edhak el soura tetlaa helwa	Tariq's Father	
1997	Zeezinya	Mustafa Bajato	1 episode
1997	Eish El Ghurab	Akram	
1997	Hassan Ellol	Zakaryaa	
1996	Nesf Rabie' Al-Akhar	Ashraf Hussain Olwan	1 episode
1996	El-bahs an Tut Ankh Amoun		
1996	Ightiyal	Contract Killer	
1995	Bakhit wa Adeela		
1995	Fi alsayf alhab Jinun	Himself	
1995	Leila Sakhina	Himself	
1995	Tamer We Shawkiya	Bolly	
1995	Toyour elzalam	Himself	
1994	Kashf El Mastoor	Kamal Rashdan	
1992	Ays Krim fi Glim	Adham	

== Music ==
Ezzat was keyboardist for Les Petits Chats, a rock band established in 1967. Ezzat formed the band 4M in the early 1980s with his four sisters Mona, Maha, Manal and Mervat. 4M came to an end when the sisters went their separate ways

Year	Title	Category	Role
1997	Hassan Ellol	Movie	
1995	Fi alsayf alhab jinun	Movie	
1988	We Share Your Joy	Movie	
1986	The Fare	Movie	Music
1985	Almagoona	Music	Music
1984	Ten at the Minister's Door	Play	Music
1982	The Lock	Movie	
1981	At the Minister's Door	Series - Radio	
1979	Login Uniformed	Play	Music Composer
1978	A Quiet Journey	Series	Music
1977	Hikayat Mizo	Series	Music

== Death ==
Morocco World News reported that he had been suffering from heart and liver problems in his final years. Abou Ouf's health had further deteriorated following the death of his wife Fatima in 2015, as the artist was suffering from pneumonia. The last few weeks of his life were spent in ICU receiving treatment. His funeral took place at the Sayeda Nafisa Mosque in Cairo.
