= Khaled Youssef =

Egyptian director

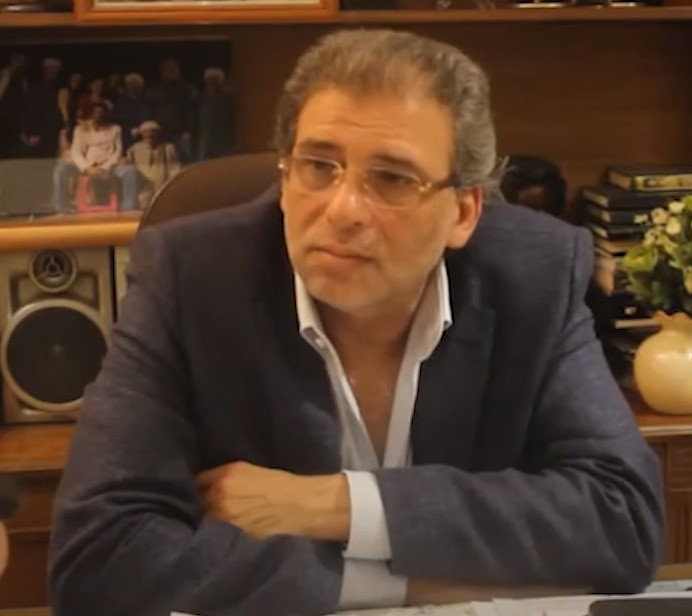
- Born: 28 September 1964 (age 61); Kafr Shokr
- Citizenship: Egypt
- Occupations: director and film writer.

Khaled Youssef (Arabic: خالد يوسف; born 28 September 1964) is an Egyptian director and film writer. His films are noted for their use of improvisation and a realistic cinéma vérité style. In a career spanning more than three decades, Youssef's films have encompassed many themes and genres. For several audiences, his films were an early prediction for 2010/2011 Arab uprisings. In his films, Youssef has addressed the issues of authoritarianism, lack social justice, poverty, religious intolerance, corruption, restrictions on the freedom of thoughts and opinion, and the sexual violence in the Egyptian and the Arab communities. As a result, he has been targeted by tens of judicial prosecutions and political harassments, motivated by different governments, over decades. Recently, He became a member of the Egyptian Parliament since November 2015.

== Biography ==
He was one of the outstanding leaders of the students' movement in eighties. He was head of Students' Union at Zagazig University, Banha Branch, 1988-1989. He obtained Bachelor of Engineering, Department of Electronic and Electrical communication Engineering in 1990.

He was head of the Film Commission, the Supreme Council of Culture in 2012. He was a member of the 50-Member Committee for drafting Egypt's Constitution in 2013

He has been a member of the Egyptian parliament since 2015. He participated in students' activities launched relationship between the Director and senior politicians, cultured and creative characters in Egypt, such as Youssef Shahin who advised him to work in cinema when he felt that he enjoys talent. Therefore, he offered him to know about cinema world through participation in short narrative documentary film "Al Kahira Monwara Beahliha" when an acting personality embodiment was entrusted to him, in addition to training on directing. He quickly discovered his being attracted to direction, so he joined Youssef Shahin scholars.

In 1992, he became co-director to Youssef Shahin in "Al Muhajer" film. He participated in writing the film's scenario and dialogue together with others. This is highly reflected in the next films, particularly when he became the exclusive director of "Al Maseer", "Al Akhar", and "Alexandria New York " that he assisted Youssef Shahin in writing the story, scenario and dialogue for these films.

In 2000, he authored and directed his first film "Al Asifa", and he obtained the grand prize of International Arbitration Committee in Cairo International Cinema Festival (Silver Pyramid), and the reward of Best Arabic Film, in addition to the reward of best director (Top Work) in the National Festival of the Egyptian Cinema. He participated in many international festivals, such as San Francisco Festival in USA. In 2001, he directed his second Film "Gwaz Biqarar Gomhoury", and he obtained the reward of best director (Top Work) in the National Festival of the Egyptian Cinema. In 2004, he directed "Enta Omry" Film, and represented Egypt in Cairo International Cinema Festival. The film obtained the reward of the Best Actress. In 2005-2006, he presented "Weja" and "Khiana Mshroua" Movies that were authored and directed by him. Those two films reflected the extent audience response to his movies. In 2007, he participated Director Youssef Shahin in directing "Heya Fawda" Movie, which constituted a rare precedent in the history of the Egyptian cinema. This film represented Egypt in the official contest of Venice International Cinema Festival. In the same year (2007), he presented his Movie "Hena Mysara", which sparked controversy not only in Egypt, but also worldwide as it was widely successful at the both criticism and audience admiration levels. The movie gained the most prizes of National Festival of Egyptian Cinema, such as the Best Movie Prize, the Best Director, the Best decoration, and the Best Drama. In 2008, he presented "Al Rayis Omar Harb" Movie, and obtained the prize of the Best Director of the National Festival of Egyptian Cinema for the second year respectively. In 2009, he presented his ninth Movie "Dokan Shehata" after he became one of the most prominent directors of Arab Cinema, and the most famous one due to the issues tackled by such movies that deserve discussion through cinematic style distinguished by suspension, accompanied with dramatic storyline and excellence of outstanding style presented through visual narration. In 2010, he presented his tenth Movie "Kalemni Shokan", through which he presented his own vision regarding the effect of communication revolution on changing the values and traditions believes in Arab community. During the same year, he directed his eleventh Movie "Kaf El Qamar", but he was able to screen it only by the end of 2011 due to the circumstances of 25 January Revolution. "Heya Fawda", "Hena Maysara" and "Dokan Shehata" trilogies are considered to be among the movies that contributed highly in disclosing the volume of deteriorating indeed the very bad facts, including of poverty, oppression and injustice witnessed by Egyptians the matter that rooted the spirit of rebellion of rebellion which led to 25 January Revolution. During the 30 June anti-government protests; he was chosen by the Armed Forces to photograph the demonstrations from military aircraft. He was the only cinema director photographing these scenes. These photos have been used as propaganda by the military in their attempt at convincing the world that the 2013 military coup against President Morsi was instead a people's revolution. According to Dubai International Film Festival 2013 two of Khaled Youssef's movies "Heya Fawda" and "Hena Mysara" were in the list of the “100 Best Arab Films of All Times”

== Early life ==
He was born in a village in Delta Egypt (Kafr Shokr) in 1964 to a father who served as mayor, in addition to being the secretary of Socialist Union at Kafr Shokr (the only political organization founded during the rule of President Gamal Abdelnasser). His father breaded him culturally upbringing with social and political dimensions because of the bias of the father to the ideas of Arab Socialism (Nasserism). His father's relationship with Khalid Mohi Eldin, the member of 23rd Revolution Leadership Council, and one of the main symbols of the leftism and socialism in the Arab world impacted him remarkably in his youth to make him familiar with the outlets of extensive knowledge and considerable experience added to him and contributed to formation of consciousness.

== Career ==
Acting

- Al Kahira Monwara Beahliha (1991) - The role of the unemployed
- Gwaz Biqarar Gomhour (2001) - The role of the director
- Enta Omri (2004) - The role of Dean of the College
- Ouija (2005) - The role of assistant director
- Khyiana Mshroa (2006) The role of Kamal Hanna

Authoring

- Al Muhajer - (participated in the scenario with others)
- Al Maseer - screenplay and dialogue with Youssef Shahine
- El Akhar - scenario and dialogue with Youssef Shahine
- El Assifa - Author (story and screenplay and dialogue)
- Gwaz Biqarar Gomhoury – (dramatic vision)
- Ouija - Author (story and screenplay and dialogue)
- Khyiana Mshroa - author (story and screenplay and dialogue)
- Hena Maysara - screenplay and dialogue with Nasser Abdul Rahman
- Kaf El Kammar - screenplay and dialogue with Nasser Abdul Rahman

Directing

- 1994 Al Muhajer film by Youssef Shahine (assistant director)
- 1995 Short film Lumiere brothers by Youssef Shahine (executive director)
- 1996 Fate film by Youssef Shahine (executive director)
- 1997 Short film Kolaha khatwa by Youssef Shahine (executive director)
- 1998 The Other film by Youssef Shahine (executive director)
- 2000 Storm (director)
- 2001 Marriage by a presidential decree (director)
- 2002 Alexandria New York film (executive director)
- 2004 Enta Omri (director)
- 2005 Ouija (director)
- 2006 Khyiana Mshroa (director)
- 2007 Heya fawda? (director)
- 2007 Hena Maysara (director)
- 2008 Rayes Omar Harb (director)
- 2009 Dokkan Shehata (director)
- 2010 Kalemni Shokran (director)
- 2011 Kaf el Kamar (director)
- 2018 Karma (director)

== Personal life ==
Married to Saudi Formative Artist Shalimar Sharbatly.

== Controversy ==
In an interview with Egyptian ON TV channel which was broadcast on August 10, 2015, Yousuf blamed Jews for the failure of Egyptian films at the Cannes film festival. While acknowledging that he is not a religious scholar, Yousuf claimed (as translated by MEMRI) that "the Jews would join Islam in its early days ... and two days later, they would leave it, saying: it's not for us. This way, they undermine the faith of the believers." Yousuf claimed that Jews still engage in this behavior against Muslims today in fields such as cinema, explaining that "When we would go to the Cannes Festival, they would try to make the Egyptian film fail. They tried to make the press give it bad reviews. So they would buy up all the tickets to the movie theater. That way, you would get the impression that the place was packed...By the time a third of the film was over, the theater would be empty. What would the press say? The film was a disaster and everybody left in the middle. The same thing happened at the advent of Islam."
