= Palestinian Bar Association =

Organization based in Palestine

- النقابة الفلسطينية للمحامين
- Formation: 1973
- Location: Ramallah, Palestine
- Website: www.palestinebar.ps

The Palestinian Bar Association (Arabic: النقابة الفلسطينية للمحامين) is an organization that represents lawyers in the State of Palestine. It was established in 1973 and has its headquarters in Ramallah.

== History ==
The Palestinian Bar Association was founded in 1973, during the period of the Palestine Liberation Organization's (PLO) armed struggle against Israel. The Association was established as a professional organization for lawyers in the Palestinian territories, with the aim of promoting the rule of law and defending the legal rights of Palestinians.

== Structure ==
The Palestinian Bar Association is governed by a council that is elected by its members every three years. The council is responsible for setting the Association's policies and priorities, and for overseeing its activities. The Association also has a number of committees that focus on specific areas of legal practice, such as human rights, commercial law, and criminal law.

== Activities ==
The Palestinian Bar Association plays an important role in promoting the rule of law and defending the legal rights of Palestinians. It provides legal assistance to Palestinians who have been arrested or detained by Israeli authorities, and it works to promote the rights of Palestinian prisoners. The Association also provides legal aid to Palestinian refugees and helps to ensure that their legal rights are protected.

== International Relations ==
The Palestinian Bar Association is a member of several international legal organizations, including the International Bar Association and the Union of Arab Lawyers. It has also established partnerships with legal organizations in other countries, such as the American Bar Association and the Law Society of England and Wales.
