= List of 8 Out of 10 Cats episodes =

8 Out of 10 Cats is a British comedy panel show. It was first broadcast on Channel 4 on 3 June 2005. The show was hosted by Jimmy Carr and the last team captains were Rob Beckett and Katherine Ryan.

The original lineup featured host Jimmy Carr with team captains Sean Lock and Dave Spikey. Spikey was replaced by Jason Manford from the fifth series onwards, who was in turn replaced by Jon Richardson in the eleventh series. For the nineteenth series, both captains were replaced by Aisling Bea and Rob Beckett, although the previous captains remained as regulars on 8 Out of 10 Cats Does Countdown and the show moved to More4. It moved to E4 for the following series, with Beckett remaining as captain while Bea was replaced by various guest captains. From Series 22 (2020), Katherine Ryan became a permanent team captain.

As of 17 January 2021, 232 episodes of 8 Out of 10 Cats have aired, concluding the twenty-second series.

== Series overview ==
| Series | Episodes | Originally released | | |
| Series | Episodes | First released | Last released | Network |
|---|---|---|---|---|
| 1 | 11 | 3 June 2005 | 12 August 2005 | Channel 4 |
| 2 | 7 | 10 February 2006 | 24 March 2006 | Channel 4 |
| 3 | 9 | 26 May 2006 | 18 August 2006 | Channel 4 |
| 4 | 9 | 20 October 2006 | 15 December 2006 | Channel 4 |
| 5 | 7 | 15 June 2007 | 30 August 2007 | Channel 4 |
| 6 | 6 | 13 June 2008 | 18 July 2008 | Channel 4 |
| 7 | 15 | 4 September 2008 | 26 December 2008 | Channel 4 |
| 8 | 8 | 5 June 2009 | 24 July 2009 | Channel 4 |
| 9 | 8 | 8 January 2010 | 21 August 2010 | Channel 4 |
| 10 | 8 | 11 June 2010 | 23 December 2010 | Channel 4 |
| Special | | 5 March 2011 | | Channel 4 |
| 11 | 11 | 17 June 2011 | 26 August 2011 | Channel 4 |
| 12 | 12 | 23 September 2011 | 23 December 2011 | Channel 4 |
| Special | | 23 March 2012 | | Channel 4 |
| 13 | 11 | 27 April 2012 | 6 July 2012 | Channel 4 |
| 14 | 12 | 8 October 2012 | 24 December 2012 | Channel 4 |
| 15 | 12 | 18 January 2013 | 9 September 2013 | Channel 4 |
| 16 | 11 | 4 October 2013 | 29 December 2013 | Channel 4 |
| 17 | 11 | 17 February 2014 | 20 August 2014 | Channel 4 |
| 18 | 12 | 6 October 2014 | 23 December 2014 | Channel 4 |
| Specials | 2 | 24 December 2015 | 29 December 2015 | Channel 4 |
| 19 | 12 | 8 November 2016 | 1 February 2017 | More4 |
| 20 | 12 | 16 May 2017 | 1 August 2017 | E4 |
| 21 | 12 | 24 March 2019 | 6 January 2020 | E4 |
| 22 | 12 | 7 January 2020 | 17 January 2021 | E4 |

== Episodes ==
Legend
– Indicates Sean's/Rob's team won.
– Indicates the other team won.
– Indicates the game ended in a draw.

=== Series 1 (2005) ===
| No. overall | No. in series | Original air date | Sean's Team | Dave's Team | Scores | UK viewers (millions) |
|---|---|---|---|---|---|---|
| 1 | 1 | 3 June 2005 | Mel Giedroyc and Richard Madeley | Simon Amstell and Lee Mack | 14–7 | 2.44 |
| 2 | 2 | 10 June 2005 | Christian O'Connell and Tara Palmer-Tomkinson | Krishnan Guru-Murthy and David Walliams | 9–11 | 2.04 |
| 3 | 3 | 17 June 2005 | Alan Carr and Claudia Winkleman | Eamonn Holmes and Lee Mack | 6–15 | 1.96 |
| 4 | 4 | 24 June 2005 | June Sarpong and Peter Serafinowicz | Paul Kaye and Sue Perkins | 8–8 | N/A |
| 5 | 5 | 1 July 2005 | Scott Capurro and Debra Stephenson | Mel Giedroyc and Laurence Llewelyn-Bowen | 8–8 | 2.62 |
| 6 | 6 | 8 July 2005 | Iain Lee and Rob Rouse | Frankie Boyle and Alan Carr | 9–13 | 2.58 |
| 7 | 7 | 15 July 2005 | Paddy McGuinness and Janet Street-Porter | Trisha Goddard and Lee Mack | 8–5 | 3.23 |
| 8 | 8 | 22 July 2005 | Simon Amstell and Ralf Little | Sarah Beeny and Iain Lee | 5–7 | 2.72 |
| 9 | 9 | 29 July 2005 | Scott Capurro and Jayne Middlemiss | Rob Rouse and Johnny Vegas | 8–5 | 2.57 |
| 10 | 10 | 5 August 2005 | Alan Carr and Vic Reeves | Frankie Boyle and Kate Garraway | 5–8 | 2.95 |
| 11 | 11 | 12 August 2005 (Note: Big Brother special) | Kieron "Science" Harvey and Liza Tarbuck | Jeremy Edwards and Derek Laud | 8–7 | 4.83 |

=== Series 2 (2006) ===
| No. overall | No. in series | Original air date | Sean's Team | Dave's Team | Scores | UK viewers (millions) |
|---|---|---|---|---|---|---|
| 12 | 1 | 10 February 2006 | Zoe Ball and Scott Capurro | Sally Lindsay and Ben Miller | 6–7 | N/A |
| 13 | 2 | 17 February 2006 | Jade Goody and Reginald D. Hunter | Ed Byrne and Paddy McGuinness | 7–6 | N/A |
| 14 | 3 | 24 February 2006 | Kelly Osbourne and Vic Reeves | Richard Madeley and Neil Morrissey | 4–9 | N/A |
| 15 | 4 | 3 March 2006 | Chris O'Dowd and Meera Syal | Alan Carr and Sally Phillips | 7–7 | N/A |
| 16 | 5 | 10 March 2006 | Les Dennis and Krishnan Guru-Murthy | Frankie Boyle and Chantelle Houghton | 8–5 | N/A |
| 17 | 6 | 17 March 2006 | Lauren Laverne and Christian Slater | Rob Rouse and Johnny Vegas | 11–4 | 2.11 |
| 18 | 7 | 24 March 2006 | Jessica Stevenson and Carol Thatcher | Alan Carr and Ulrika Jonsson | 6–9 | N/A |

=== Series 3 (2006) ===
| No. overall | No. in series | Original air date | Sean's Team | Dave's Team | Scores | UK viewers (millions) |
|---|---|---|---|---|---|---|
| 19 | 1 | 26 May 2006 | David Baddiel and Ruth Badger | Alan Carr and Ulrika Jonsson | 6–9 | 2.91 |
| 20 | 2 | 2 June 2006 | Debra Stephenson and David Walliams | Frankie Boyle and Bez | 5–7 | 2.73 |
| 21 | 3 | 9 June 2006 | Peter Serafinowicz and Johnny Vegas | Reginald D. Hunter and Jayne Middlemiss | 4–8 | 2.65 |
| 22 | 4 | 16 June 2006 | Edith Bowman and Julian Clary | Dave Johns and Sally Lindsay | 8–4 | 3.58 |
| 23 | 5 | 23 June 2006 | Krishnan Guru-Murthy and Vic Reeves | David Walliams and Louis Walsh | 3–6 | 3.58 |
| 24 | 6 | 30 June 2006 | Germaine Greer and Phill Jupitus | Fiona Allen and Jason Manford | 6–7 | 3.41 |
| 25 | 7 | 7 July 2006 | Emo Philips and Alex Zane | Trisha Goddard and Justin Moorhouse | 3–6 | 3.38 |
| 26 | 8 | 14 July 2006 | Eamonn Holmes and Vic Reeves | Joan Rivers and Holly Willoughby | 8–4 | 3.97 |
| 27 | 9 | 18 August 2006 | Dom Joly and Lea Walker | Grace Adams-Short and Jason Manford | 6–6 | 5.28 |

=== Series 4 (2006) ===
| No. overall | No. in series | Original air date | Sean's Team | Dave's Team | Scores | UK viewers (millions) |
|---|---|---|---|---|---|---|
| 28 | 1 | 20 October 2006 | Nikki Grahame and Rich Hall | Boy George and Lee Mack | 5–6 | N/A |
| 29 | 2 | 27 October 2006 | Scott Capurro and Kirsty Gallacher | Jason Manford and Piers Morgan | 5–5 | N/A |
| 30 | 3 | 3 November 2006 | Duncan Bannatyne and Trisha Goddard | Frankie Boyle and Jonathan Ross | 8–4 | N/A |
| 31 | 4 | 10 November 2006 | Rhys Thomas and Louis Walsh | Reginald D. Hunter and Sally Lindsay | 6–6 | N/A |
| 32 | 5 | 17 November 2006 | Ulrika Jonsson and Michael McIntyre | Krishnan Guru-Murthy and Johnny Vegas | 8–4 | N/A |
| 33 | 6 | 24 November 2006 | Lee Mack and Bill Oddie | Fiona Allen and Griff Rhys Jones | 2–8 | N/A |
| 34 | 7 | 1 December 2006 | John Barrowman and Vic Reeves | Chris Addison and Jade Goody | 4–6 | N/A |
| 35 | 8 | 8 December 2006 | Alan Carr and David Gest | Joan Rivers and Alex Zane | 4–5 | N/A |
| 36 | 9 | 15 December 2006 (Note: Compilation episode – best of Series 4) | N/A | N/A | N/A | N/A |

=== Series 5 (2007) ===
| No. overall | No. in series | Original air date | Sean's Team | Jason's Team | Scores | UK viewers (millions) |
|---|---|---|---|---|---|---|
| 37 | 1 | 15 June 2007 | Katie Hopkins and Vic Reeves | Danny Dyer and Johnny Vegas | 6–4 | 2.20 |
| 38 | 2 | 22 June 2007 | Konnie Huq and Rhys Thomas | Griff Rhys Jones and David Walliams | 3–7 | 3.03 |
| 39 | 3 | 29 June 2007 | Frankie Boyle and Gok Wan | Alexa Chung and Joan Rivers | 5–4 | 2.85 |
| 40 | 4 | 6 July 2007 | Alun Cochrane and Greg Rusedski | Trisha Goddard and Glenn Wool | 4–7 | 3.36 |
| 41 | 5 | 13 July 2007 | Stewart Lee and Liza Tarbuck | Alan Cumming and Susie Essman | 5–5 | 4.01 |
| 42 | 6 | 20 July 2007 (Note: A "Teen Special", although Peaches Geldof was the only teenager on the panel.) | Chris Addison and Peaches Geldof | David Walliams and Alex Zane | 4–4 | 3.48 |
| 43 | 7 | 30 August 2007 | James Corden and Gerry Stergiopoulos | Charley Uchea and Danny Wallace | 8–6 | N/A |

=== Series 6 (2008) ===
| No. overall | No. in series | Original air date | Sean's Team | Jason's Team | Scores | UK viewers (millions) |
|---|---|---|---|---|---|---|
| 44 | 1 | 13 June 2008 | Raef Bjayou and Vic Reeves | Jodie Kidd and David Walliams | 5–7 | 3.02 |
| 45 | 2 | 20 June 2008 | Theo Paphitis and Mike Wilmot | John Bishop and Kelly Osbourne | 5–5 | 2.65 (Note: 2.37 million on Channel 4, 283,000 on Channel 4 +1) |
| 46 | 3 | 27 June 2008 | Vanessa Feltz and Lee Mack | Frankie Boyle and Matt Littler | 5–5 | 3.03 (Note: 2.76 million on Channel 4, 268,000 on Channel 4 +1) |
| 47 | 4 | 4 July 2008 | Phill Jupitus and Claudia Winkleman | Gabby Logan and Mark Watson | 3–7 | 2.98 |
| 48 | 5 | 11 July 2008 | Konnie Huq and Johnny Vaughan | Duncan James and Johnny Vegas | 4–6 | 3.18 |
| 49 | 6 | 18 July 2008 | David Baddiel and Chris Moyles | Michael McIntyre and June Sarpong | 4–6 | 3.23 |

=== Series 7 (2008) ===
| No. overall | No. in series | Original air date | Sean's Team | Jason's Team | Scores | UK viewers (millions) |
|---|---|---|---|---|---|---|
| 50 | 1 | 4 September 2008 | Scott Capurro and James Corden | Alun Cochrane and Carol McGiffin | 6–4 | 2.10 |
| 51 | 2 | 5 September 2008 | Lisa Appleton, Mario Marconi and Danny Wallace | Vanessa Feltz and Luke Marsden | 7–4 | 1.90 |
| 52 | 3 | 11 September 2008 | Christopher Biggins and Jamelia | Chris Hoy and Mark Watson | 4–6 | N/A |
| 53 | 4 | 18 September 2008 | Vic Reeves and Claudia Winkleman | Danny Jones and Jack Whitehall | 6–4 | N/A |
| 54 | 5 | 25 September 2008 | Tara Palmer-Tomkinson and Doug Stanhope | Rhod Gilbert and Ulrika Jonsson | 4–6 | N/A |
| 55 | 6 | 2 October 2008 | Greg Davies and John Thomson | Peter Andre and Sarah Millican | 5–3 | N/A |
| 56 | 7 | 9 October 2008 | Stewart Francis and Alex Zane | Kelly Osbourne and Andy Zaltzman | 6–4 | N/A |
| 57 | 8 | 16 October 2008 | Alun Cochrane and Kelvin MacKenzie | Steve Jones and Sarah Silverman | 2–9 | N/A |
| 58 | 9 | 23 October 2008 | James Corden and Jim Jefferies | Charlie Brooker and Olivia Lee | 3–6 | N/A |
| 59 | 10 | 30 October 2008 | Chris Addison and Johnny Vegas (Note: Originally Johnny was on Jason's team and Nicky was on Sean's team. During the recording Johnny swapped with Nicky and the swap remained for the rest of the show.) | Krishnan Guru-Murthy and Nicky Hambleton-Jones | 5–4 | N/A |
| 60 | 11 | 6 November 2008 | Rich Hall and Russell Howard | Jodie Kidd and Michael McIntyre | 3–6 | N/A |
| 61 | 12 | 13 November 2008 | Kayvan Novak and Louis Walsh | Lee Mack and Jennie McAlpine | 4–5 | 2.44 (Note: 2.09 million on Channel 4, 353,000 on Channel 4 +1) |
| 62 | 13 | 20 November 2008 | David Mitchell and Claudia Winkleman | Ken Livingstone and Jack Whitehall | 4–4 | 2.02 (Note: 1.71 million on Channel 4, 312,000 on Channel 4 +1) |
| 63 | 14 | 27 November 2008 | James Corden and Gabby Logan | Steve Jones and Carol Vorderman | 6–4 | N/A |
| 64 | 15 | 26 December 2008 (Note: Compilation episode – best of Series 7) | N/A | N/A | N/A | N/A |

=== Series 8 (2009) ===
| No. overall | No. in series | Original air date | Sean's Team | Jason's Team | Scores | UK viewers (millions) |
|---|---|---|---|---|---|---|
| 65 | 1 | 5 June 2009 | Johnny Vegas and Alex Zane | Ulrika Jonsson and Jack Whitehall | 5–5 | 2.29 |
| 66 | 2 | 12 June 2009 | Jeremy Clarkson and James McQuillan | David Walliams and Holly Walsh | 2–7 | 2.64 |
| 67 | 3 | 19 June 2009 | Josie Long and Jamelia | Mark Watson and Claudia Winkleman | 4–4 | 2.45 |
| 68 | 4 | 26 June 2009 (Note: Movie special) | Tom Felton and Richard E. Grant | Alan Cumming and Lauren Laverne | 4–2 | 2.21 |
| 69 | 5 | 3 July 2009 | Yvette Fielding and David Walliams | Reginald D. Hunter and Phil Spencer | 5–4 | 2.45 |
| 70 | 6 | 10 July 2009 | Reginald D. Hunter and Kelly Osbourne | Terry Christian and Isy Suttie | 4–6 | 2.40 |
| 71 | 7 | 17 July 2009 (Note: Best of British special) | Kevin Bridges and Patrick Kielty | Rhod Gilbert and Shappi Khorsandi | 3–7 | 2.94 |
| 72 | 8 | 24 July 2009 (Note: Compilation episode – best of Series 8) | N/A | N/A | N/A | 2.04 |

=== Series 9 (2010) ===
| No. overall | No. in series | Original air date | Sean's Team | Jason's Team | Scores | UK viewers (millions) |
|---|---|---|---|---|---|---|
| 73 | 1 | 8 January 2010 | Shappi Khorsandi and Claudia Winkleman | Charlie Clements and Jamelia | 5–5 | 3.79 (Note: 3.41 million on Channel 4, 380,000 on Channel 4 +1) |
| 74 | 2 | 15 January 2010 | Josie Long and Fay Ripley | Peter Jones and Jack Whitehall | 3–6 | 2.76 |
| 75 | 3 | 22 January 2010 (Note: Sport special) | Gabby Logan and Johnny Vaughan | John Bishop and Denise Lewis | 4–5 | 2.57 |
| 76 | 4 | 29 January 2010 | Stephen Baldwin and Alun Cochrane | Michael Ball and Jodie Kidd | 3–6 | 3.48 |
| 77 | 5 | 5 February 2010 | Greg Davies and Holly Walsh | Fern Britton and David Walliams | 4–7 | N/A |
| 78 | 6 | 12 February 2010 (Note: Digital special) | David O'Doherty and Carol Vorderman | John Bishop and Peter Serafinowicz | 4–5 | 1.81 |
| 79 | 7 | 19 February 2010 | Janice Dickinson and Rhod Gilbert | Lauren Laverne and David Walliams | 4–6 | 2.16 |
| 80 | 8 | 21 August 2010 (Note: Compilation episode – best of Series 9) | N/A | N/A | N/A | N/A |

=== Series 10 (2010) ===
| No. overall | No. in series | Original air date | Sean's Team | Jason's Team | Scores | UK viewers (millions) |
|---|---|---|---|---|---|---|
| 81 | 1 | 11 June 2010 (Note: World Cup special) | Peter Shilton and Jack Whitehall | Helen Chamberlain and Paddy McGuinness | 4–7 | 1.73 |
| 82 | 2 | 9 September 2010 | Brian Belo and Jarred Christmas | Charlie Brooker and Josie Gibson | 3–4 | N/A |
| 83 | 3 | 17 September 2010 | Jack Dee and Dr. Christian Jessen | Jack Whitehall and Jamelia | 5–5 | 1.61 |
| 84 | 4 | 24 September 2010 | Sarah Millican and Johnny Vaughan | Jon Richardson and Louie Spence | 4–5 | 1.51 |
| 85 | 5 | 1 October 2010 | Stephen Mangan and Mark Watson | Vanessa Feltz and Daniel Sloss | 4–6 | 1.68 |
| 86 | 6 | 8 October 2010 (Note: Scary special) | Uri Geller and Holly Walsh | Tim Minchin and Jack Osbourne | 3–5 | 1.77 |
| 87 | 7 | 15 October 2010 (Note: Scientific special) | Russell Kane and Carol Vorderman | Rufus Hound and Myleene Klass | 4–4 | 1.69 |
| 88 | 8 | 23 December 2010 (Note: Christmas special) | Christopher Biggins and Jack Dee | Lorraine Kelly and Josie Long | 3–4 | 1.51 |

=== Comic Relief special (2011) ===
| No. overall | No. in series | Original air date | Sean's Team | David Walliams' Team | Scores | UK viewers (millions) |
|---|---|---|---|---|---|---|
| 89 | 1 | 5 March 2011 (Note: Special episode webcast live as part of 24 Hour Panel People. David Walliams took the place of Jason Manford.) | Victoria Coren and Josh Widdicombe | Jon Richardson and Jamelia | 3–8 | N/A |

=== Series 11 (2011) ===
| No. overall | No. in series | Original air date | Sean's Team | Jon's Team | Scores | UK viewers (millions) |
|---|---|---|---|---|---|---|
| 90 | 1 | 17 June 2011 | Russell Kane and Alex Reid | Rachel Riley and Josh Widdicombe | (Note: The scores were not stated at the end of this episode.) | 1.88 |
| 91 | 2 | 24 June 2011 | Krishnan Guru-Murthy and Joe Wilkinson | Patsy Palmer and Jack Whitehall | 4–2 | 1.63 |
| 92 | 3 | 1 July 2011 | Amy Childs and Sarah Millican | Seann Walsh and Gok Wan | 2–3 | 2.22 (Note: 1.84 million on Channel 4, 381,000 on Channel 4 +1) |
| 93 | 4 | 8 July 2011 | Bear Grylls and Chris Ramsey | Patsy Kensit and Sarah Millican | 3–3 | 1.97 |
| 94 | 5 | 15 July 2011 | Micky Flanagan and Jedward | Charlie Brooker and Lorraine Kelly | 2–3 | 1.84 |
| 95 | 6 | 22 July 2011 | Jack Dee and Jamelia | Micky Flanagan and Kelly Osbourne | 1–4 | 1.93 |
| 96 | 7 | 29 July 2011 | David O'Doherty and Tim Westwood | Matthew Crosby and Lauren Laverne | 4–3 | 2.14 (Note: 1.82 million on Channel 4, 318,000 on Channel 4 +1) |
| 97 | 8 | 5 August 2011 | Sarah Millican and Kate Silverton | Rhod Gilbert and Gregg Wallace | 4–2 | 2.14 (Note: 1.77 million on Channel 4, 371,000 on Channel 4 +1) |
| 98 | 9 | 12 August 2011 | Rachel Riley and Daniel Sloss | Nick Grimshaw and Peter Serafinowicz | 4–2 | 2.13 (Note: 1.84 million on Channel 4, 290,000 on Channel 4 +1) |
| 99 | 10 | 19 August 2011 | Dr. Christian Jessen and Josh Widdicombe | Russell Kane and Kimberley Walsh | 2–3 | 1.85 (Note: 1.54 million on Channel 4, 314,000 on Channel 4 +1) |
| 100 | 11 | 26 August 2011 (Note: Compilation episode – best of Series 11) | N/A | N/A | N/A | 1.64 (Note: 1.32 million on Channel 4, 324,000 on Channel 4 +1) |

=== Series 12 (2011) ===
| No. overall | No. in series | Original air date | Sean's Team | Jon's Team | Scores | UK viewers (millions) |
|---|---|---|---|---|---|---|
| 101 | 1 | 23 September 2011 | Amir Khan and Holly Walsh | Richard Ayoade and Josh Widdicombe | 4–1 | 1.72 |
| 102 | 2 | 30 September 2011 | Ollie Locke and Joe Wilkinson | Nick Grimshaw and Sarah Millican | 4-4 | 1.58 |
| 103 | 3 | 7 October 2011 | David O'Doherty and Craig Revel Horwood | Rick Edwards and Ellie Taylor | 2–3 | 1.50 |
| 104 | 4 | 14 October 2011 | Lorraine Kelly and Sarah Millican | Dr. Christian Jessen and Tom Rosenthal | 2–2 | N/A |
| 105 | 5 | 21 October 2011 | Vernon Kay and Joe Wilkinson | Tim Minchin and Rachel Riley | 3–3 | N/A |
| 106 | 6 | 28 October 2011 | Louie Spence and Joe Wilkinson | Elis James and Shappi Khorsandi | 2–2 | N/A |
| 107 | 7 | 4 November 2011 | Russell Kane and Louise Redknapp | Mark Watson and Example | 2–3 | N/A |
| 108 | 8 | 11 November 2011 | Joey Essex and Joe Lycett | Jennifer Metcalfe and Johnny Vegas | 2–3 | 1.60 |
| 109 | 9 | 18 November 2011 | Matthew Crosby and Kimberly Wyatt | Olly Murs and Russell Peters | 4–3 | N/A |
| 110 | 10 | 25 November 2011 | Jack Dee and Stacey Solomon | Alex James and David O'Doherty | 3–3 | N/A |
| 111 | 11 | 9 December 2011 (Note: Compilation episode – best of Series 12) | N/A | N/A | N/A | N/A |
| 112 | 12 | 23 December 2011 | Micky Flanagan and Liza Tarbuck | Greg Davies and Jedward | | 2.41 (Note: 1.99 million on Channel 4, 418,000 on Channel 4 +1) |

=== Sport Relief special (2012) ===
| No. overall | No. in series | Original air date | Sean's Team | Jon's Team | Scores | UK viewers (millions) |
|---|---|---|---|---|---|---|
| 113 | 1 | 23 March 2012 (Note: Special episode aired as part of Sport Relief 2012.) | Russell Kane and Rachel Riley | Example and Mark Watson | 2–0 | N/A |

=== Series 13 (2012) ===
| No. overall | No. in series | Original air date | Sean's Team | Jon's Team | Scores | UK viewers (millions) |
|---|---|---|---|---|---|---|
| 114 | 1 | 27 April 2012 | Gabby Logan and Joe Wilkinson | Natalie Cassidy and Ellie Taylor | 5–4 | 1.41 |
| 115 | 2 | 4 May 2012 | Hannibal Buress and Stephen Mangan | Sam Buttery and Katherine Ryan | 3–2 | 1.34 |
| 116 | 3 | 11 May 2012 | David Hasselhoff and Justin Moorhouse | Rob Beckett and Rachel Riley | 3–3 | 1.66 (Note: 1.33 million on Channel 4, 331,000 on Channel 4 +1) |
| 117 | 4 | 18 May 2012 | Vernon Kay and Katherine Ryan | Paul Chowdhry and Johnny Vegas | 2–3 | 1.54 (Note: 1.21 million on Channel 4, 334,000 on Channel 4 +1) |
| 118 | 5 | 25 May 2012 | Nick Helm and Claudia Winkleman | Kate Humble and David O'Doherty | 2–3 | 1.53 (Note: 1.17 million on Channel 4, 358,000 on Channel 4 +1) |
| 119 | 6 | 1 June 2012 | Micky Flanagan and Krishnan Guru-Murthy | Tess Daly and Hari Kondabolu | 1–4 | 1.69 (Note: 1.29 million on Channel 4, 404,000 on Channel 4 +1) |
| 120 | 7 | 9 June 2012 (Note: Jubilee special. Moved back a day due to Alan Carr's Summer Specstacular) | Jennie Bond and Sarah Millican | Miles Jupp and Chris Kamara | 4–3 | 1.63 |
| 121 | 8 | 15 June 2012 | Reginald D. Hunter and Rachel Riley | Gemma Collins and Josh Widdicombe | 6–1 | 1.54 |
| 122 | 9 | 22 June 2012 | Sarah Millican and Georgie Thompson | Micky Flanagan and Louie Spence | 3–5 | 3.06 (Note: 2.63 million on Channel 4, 425,000 on Channel 4 +1. The reason for the increased viewership was that was recorded and shown on the week that Jimmy Carr's tax avoidance scandal was revealed) |
| 123 | 10 | 29 June 2012 (Note: Compilation episode – best of Series 13 (Part 1)) | N/A | N/A | N/A | 1.34 |
| 124 | 11 | 6 July 2012 (Note: Compilation episode – best of Series 13 (Part 2)) | N/A | N/A | N/A | N/A |

=== Series 14 (2012) ===
| No. overall | No. in series | Original air date | Sean's Team | Jon's Team | Scores | UK viewers (millions) |
|---|---|---|---|---|---|---|
| 125 | 1 | 8 October 2012 | Heston Blumenthal and Katherine Ryan | Hannah Cockroft and Josh Widdicombe | 3–4 | 1.47 |
| 126 | 2 | 15 October 2012 | Nicola Adams and Nick Helm | Rob Beckett and Jason Biggs | 5–2 | 1.44 |
| 127 | 3 | 22 October 2012 | Micky Flanagan and Stephen Mangan | Natalie Cassidy and Humphrey Ker | 5–1 | 1.54 |
| 128 | 4 | 29 October 2012 | Joe Lycett and Louie Spence | David O'Doherty and Rachel Riley | 7–2 | 1.32 |
| 129 | 5 | 5 November 2012 | John Hannah and Bobby Mair | Holly Walsh and Example | 4–6 | 1.60 |
| 130 | 6 | 12 November 2012 | Alice Levine and Louis Smith | Tony Law and Carol Vorderman | 3–3 | 1.70 (Note: 1.40 million on Channel 4, 301,000 on Channel 4 +1) |
| 131 | 7 | 19 November 2012 | Vernon Kay and Henning Wehn | Lorraine Pascale and Johnny Vegas | 4–4 | 1.54 |
| 132 | 8 | 26 November 2012 | Melanie C and Andrew Maxwell | Tess Daly and Joe Wilkinson | 4–5 | 1.36 |
| 133 | 9 | 10 December 2012 | Stephen Graham and Katherine Ryan | Micky Flanagan and Mel Giedroyc | 6–4 | 1.33 |
| 134 | 10 | 17 December 2012 (Note: Compilation episode – best of Series 14 (Part 1)) | N/A | N/A | N/A | N/A |
| 135 | 11 | 17 December 2012 (Note: Compilation episode – best of Series 14 (Part 2)) | N/A | N/A | N/A | N/A |
| 136 | 12 | 24 December 2012 | Stephen Mangan and Sarah Millican | Bruno Tonioli and Joe Wilkinson | 3–7 | 2.93 (Note: 2.46 million on Channel 4, 466,000 on Channel 4 +1) |

=== Series 15 (2013) ===
| No. overall | No. in series | Original air date | Sean's Team | Jon's Team | Scores | UK viewers (millions) |
|---|---|---|---|---|---|---|
| 137 | 1 | 18 January 2013 | Jack Dee and Claudia Winkleman | David O'Doherty and Josh Widdicombe | 4–3 | 2.89 (Note: 2.41 million on Channel 4, 482,000 on Channel 4 +1) |
| 138 | 2 | 25 January 2013 | Richard Bacon and Henning Wehn | Gemma Collins and Katherine Ryan | 2–5 | 1.91 |
| 139 | 3 | 1 February 2013 | Tina Malone and Joe Wilkinson | Chris Ramsey and Rachel Riley | 3–4 | 1.90 |
| 140 | 4 | 8 February 2013 | Kian Egan and Tony Law | Tess Daly and Stephen Mangan | 3–4 | 1.74 |
| 141 | 5 | 15 February 2013 | Paul Foot and Jamelia | Krishnan Guru-Murthy and David O'Doherty | 2–4 | 1.94 |
| 142 | 6 | 22 February 2013 | Danny Dyer and Miles Jupp | Alex Jones and Joe Wilkinson | 3–2 | 1.94 |
| 143 | 7 | 1 March 2013 | Jack Dee and Matt Edmondson | Rob Beckett and Victoria Coren | 4–3 | 2.15 (Note: 1.81 million on Channel 4, 342,000 on Channel 4 +1) |
| 144 | 8 | 8 March 2013 | Denise van Outen and Henning Wehn | Nick Helm and Vernon Kay | 5–2 | 1.64 |
| 145 | 9 | 22 March 2013 | Greg Rutherford and Jimeoin | Nancy Dell'Olio and Joe Wilkinson | 1–3 | 1.73 |
| 146 | 10 | 29 March 2013 | Chris Ramsey and Carol Vorderman | Susan Calman and Mel Giedroyc | 3–1 | 1.67 |
| 147 | 11 | 5 July 2013 (Note: Compilation episode – best of Series 15 (Part 1)) | N/A | N/A | N/A | N/A |
| 148 | 12 | 9 September 2013 (Note: Compilation episode – best of Series 15 (Part 2)) | N/A | N/A | N/A | N/A |

=== Series 16 (2013) ===
| No. overall | No. in series | Original air date | Sean's Team | Jon's Team | Scores | UK viewers (millions) |
|---|---|---|---|---|---|---|
| 149 | 1 | 4 October 2013 | Jack Dee and Jamelia | Steve Jones and David O'Doherty | 4–7 | 2.31 (Note: 1.88 million on Channel 4, 433,000 on Channel 4 +1) |
| 150 | 2 | 11 October 2013 | Paul Foot and Richard Hammond | Matt Forde and Carol Vorderman | 6–1 | 1.62 (Note: 1.32 million on Channel 4, 297,000 on Channel 4 +1) |
| 151 | 3 | 18 October 2013 | Helen Flanagan and Miles Jupp | Alex Brooker and Henning Wehn | 2–6 | 1.62 |
| 152 | 4 | 25 October 2013 | Krishnan Guru-Murthy and Joe Wilkinson | Aisling Bea and Tess Daly | 6–3 | 1.62 |
| 153 | 5 | 1 November 2013 | Katherine Ryan and Tinchy Stryder | Alex Jones and David O'Doherty | 3–2 | 1.65 (Note: 1.30 million on Channel 4, 354,000 on Channel 4 +1) |
| 154 | 6 | 8 November 2013 | Roisin Conaty and Joe Wilkinson | Alex Brooker and Chris Ramsey | 4–1 | 1.29 |
| 155 | 7 | 15 November 2013 | Jo Brand and Jordan Stephens | Nick Helm and Louis Walsh | 2–4 | N/A |
| 156 | 8 | 22 November 2013 | Rob Beckett and Lorraine Kelly | Andrew "Freddie" Flintoff and Josh Widdicombe | 3–2 | N/A |
| 157 | 9 | 29 November 2013 | Jack Dee and Claudia Winkleman | Trevor Noah and Josh Widdicombe | 3–5 | N/A |
| 158 | 10 | 6 December 2013 (Note: Compilation episode – best of Series 16) | N/A | N/A | N/A | N/A |
| 159 | 11 | 29 December 2013 | Roisin Conaty and Henning Wehn | Alan Davies and Holly Willoughby | 3–3 | 2.95 (Note: 2.48 million on Channel 4, 473,000 on Channel 4 +1) |

=== Series 17 (2014) ===
| No. overall | No. in series | Original air date | Sean's Team | Jon's Team | Scores | UK viewers (millions) |
|---|---|---|---|---|---|---|
| 160 | 1 | 17 February 2014 | Paul Hollywood and Joe Wilkinson | Rob Beckett and Dawn O'Porter | 2–4 | 1.74 (Note: 1.52 million on Channel 4, 224,000 on Channel 4 +1) |
| 161 | 2 | 24 February 2014 | Deborah Meaden and Seann Walsh | Steve Jones and David O'Doherty | 3–3 | 1.42 |
| 162 | 3 | 3 March 2014 | Roisin Conaty and Jerry Springer | Jack Dee and Example | 4–2 | 1.56 (Note: 1.35 million on Channel 4, 210,000 on Channel 4 +1) |
| 163 | 4 | 10 March 2014 | Mel Giedroyc and Johnny Vegas | Aisling Bea and Kym Marsh | 3–3 | 1.47 |
| 164 | 5 | 17 March 2014 | Jo Brand and Krishnan Guru-Murthy | James Acaster and Ronan Keating | 3–2 | 1.28 |
| 165 | 6 | 24 March 2014 | Dr. Christian Jessen and Joe Wilkinson | Aisling Bea and Lethal Bizzle | 3–4 | 1.30 |
| 166 | 7 | 1 April 2014 | Phil Spencer and Henning Wehn | Fern Brady and Carol Vorderman | 2–5 | 0.90 |
| 167 | 8 | 7 April 2014 | Alex Jones and Katherine Ryan | Spencer Matthews and Josh Widdicombe | 3–4 | 1.31 |
| 168 | 9 | 14 April 2014 | Kate Humble and Henning Wehn | Rob Beckett and Alex Brooker | 3–1 | 1.51 |
| 169 | 10 | 13 August 2014 (Note: Compilation episode – best of Series 17) | N/A | N/A | N/A | N/A |
| 170 | 11 | 20 August 2014 (Note: Compilation episode – Jimmy, Sean & Jon's Best Bits) | N/A | N/A | N/A | N/A |

=== Series 18 (2014) ===
| No. overall | No. in series | Original air date | Sean's Team | Jon's Team | Scores | UK viewers (millions) |
|---|---|---|---|---|---|---|
| 171 | 1 | 6 October 2014 | Rob Beckett and Jamie Laing | Gemma Cairney and Jack Dee | TBA | 1.20 |
| 172 | 2 | 13 October 2014 | Henning Wehn and Henry Winkler | Rebecca Adlington and Romesh Ranganathan | TBA | 1.14 |
| 173 | 3 | 20 October 2014 | Roisin Conaty and Craig Revel Horwood | Rob Delaney and Tom Rosenthal | TBA | N/A |
| 174 | 4 | 27 October 2014 | Paul Hollywood and Joe Wilkinson | Aisling Bea and Gabby Logan | 4–3 | 1.54 |
| 175 | 5 | 4 November 2014 (Note: Moved back a day due to Make Leicester British documentary) | James Acaster and Alex Jones | Alex Brooker and Sarah Millican | 3–3 | 1.35 |
| 176 | 6 | 10 November 2014 | Melanie C and Romesh Ranganathan | David O'Doherty and Charlotte Ritchie | 4–1 | 1.43 (Note: 1.15 million on Channel 4, 275,000 on Channel 4 +1) |
| 177 | 7 | 17 November 2014 | Joe Wilkinson and Kirsty Young | Jamie Cullum and Katherine Ryan | 4–3 | N/A |
| 178 | 8 | 24 November 2014 | Rob Beckett and Krishnan Guru-Murthy | Sara Pascoe and Carol Vorderman | 3–4 | 0.92 |
| 179 | 9 | 1 December 2014 | Louis Smith and Henning Wehn | Kelly Hoppen and David O'Doherty | 3–3 | N/A |
| 180 | 10 | 8 December 2014 (Note: Compilation episode – Jimmy, Sean & Jon's Best Bits) | N/A | N/A | N/A | N/A |
| 181 | 11 | 15 December 2014 (Note: Compilation episode – best of Series 18) | N/A | N/A | N/A | N/A |
| 182 | 12 | 23 December 2014 | Roisin Conaty and Andrew "Freddie" Flintoff | Jonathan Ross and Ricky Wilson | 2–6 | 2.07 |

=== Specials (2015) ===
| No. overall | No. in series | Original air date | Sean's Team | Jon's Team | Scores | UK viewers (millions) |
|---|---|---|---|---|---|---|
| 183 | 1 | 24 December 2015 | Peter Andre and Seann Walsh | Roisin Conaty and Joe Lycett | | 2.45 (Note: 2.15 million on Channel 4, 303,000 on Channel 4 +1) |
| 184 | 2 | 29 December 2015 (Note: End of Year special.) | Joey Essex and Romesh Ranganathan | Isy Suttie and Richard Osman | | 1.74 |

=== Series 19 (2016–17) ===
| No. overall | No. in series | Original air date | Rob's Team | Aisling's Team | Scores | UK viewers (millions) |
|---|---|---|---|---|---|---|
| 185 | 1 | 8 November 2016 | Jayde Adams and Paisley Billings | Jamie Laing and Joe Wilkinson | 2–5 | 0.397 |
| 186 | 2 | 15 November 2016 | Roisin Conaty and Cathy Newman | Joey Essex and Nish Kumar | 2–4 | 0.359 |
| 187 | 3 | 22 November 2016 | Desiree Burch and Thomas Turgoose | Fred Sirieix and Sara Pascoe | 2–4 | 0.390 |
| 188 | 4 | 29 November 2016 | Joe Wilkinson and Melanie C | Jessica Knappett and Tom Allen | 3–2 | 0.336 |
| 189 | 5 | 6 December 2016 | Dane Baptiste and Alex Jones | Craig Revel Horwood and Katherine Ryan | 4–1 | 0.407 |
| 190 | 6 | 13 December 2016 | James Acaster and Chris Kamara | Tom Davis and Tiff Stevenson | 1–3 | 0.400 |
| 191 | 7 | 21 December 2016 | Joe Wilkinson and Carrie Fisher | Brad Simpson, James McVey and Roisin Conaty | 2–2 | 0.594 |
| 192 | 8 | 4 January 2017 (Note: New Year special) | Jamali Maddix and Rick Edwards | Kate Humble and Joe Lycett | 2–3 | 0.512 |
| 193 | 9 | 11 January 2017 | Alex Brooker and Gabby Logan | Ellie Simmonds and David O'Doherty | 3–4 | N/A |
| 194 | 10 | 18 January 2017 | Michelle Wolf and Jermaine Jenas | Denise van Outen and Sam Simmons | 1–5 | 0.419 |
| 195 | 11 | 25 January 2017 (Note: Compilation episode – best of Series 19 (Part 1)) | N/A | N/A | N/A | 0.332 |
| 196 | 12 | 1 February 2017 (Note: Compilation episode – best of Series 19 (Part 2)) | N/A | N/A | N/A | N/A |

=== Series 20 (2017) ===
| No. overall | No. in series | Original air date | Rob's Team | Aisling's Team | Scores | UK viewers (millions) |
|---|---|---|---|---|---|---|
| 197 | 1 | 16 May 2017 | Jamali Maddix and Rachel Riley | Tom Davis and Sara Pascoe | 4–3 | N/A |
| 198 | 2 | 23 May 2017 | Al Porter and Kate Bottley | Sara Pascoe and Dr Xand van Tulleken | 2–3 | N/A |
| 199 | 3 | 30 May 2017 | Ellie Taylor and Richard Osman | Jessica Knappett and David O'Doherty | 0–5 (Note: Rob's team were declared the winners, as the show was filmed in the same studio as guest Richard Osman's show Pointless.) | N/A |
| 200 | 4 | 6 June 2017 | Krishnan Guru-Murthy and Rosie Jones | Gabby Logan and Phil Wang | 2–3 | N/A |
| 201 | 5 | 13 June 2017 | Tiff Stevenson and Lethal Bizzle | Jessica Knappett and Nish Kumar | 2–3 | 0.490 |
| 202 | 6 | 20 June 2017 | Joe Wilkinson and Ella Eyre | Pamela Anderson and Kerry Godliman | 2–3 | N/A |
| 203 | 7 | 27 June 2017 | Natalie Cassidy and Tom Allen | Alex Brooker and Katherine Ryan | 3–2 | 0.590 |
| 204 | 8 | 4 July 2017 | Ayda Field and Dane Baptiste | Jordan Stephens and Desiree Burch | 3–1 | 0.503 |
| 205 | 9 | 11 July 2017 | Kerry Howard and Ola | Ant Middleton and Katherine Ryan | 4–1 | 0.466 |
| 206 | 10 | 18 July 2017 | Joe Swash and Roisin Conaty | Joel Dommett and James Acaster | 3–2 | 0.637 |
| 207 | 11 | 25 July 2017 (Note: Compilation episode – best of Series 20 (Part 1)) | N/A | N/A | N/A | 0.486 |
| 208 | 12 | 1 August 2017 (Note: Compilation episode – best of Series 20 (Part 2)) | N/A | N/A | N/A | N/A |

=== Series 21 (2019–20) ===
| No. overall | No. in series | Original air date | Rob's Team | Guest team (captain in bold) | Scores | UK viewers (millions) |
|---|---|---|---|---|---|---|
| 209 | 1 | 24 March 2019 | Tom Allen and Maya Jama | Catherine Bohart, **Katherine Ryan** and Richard Osman | 4–2 | 0.610 |
| 210 | 2 | 31 March 2019 | Oti Mabuse and Russell Kane | Rylan Clark-Neal, **Sara Pascoe** and Maisie Adam | | 0.451 |
| 211 | 3 | 7 April 2019 | Fred Sirieix and Judi Love | Natasia Demetriou, **Kerry Godliman** and Nish Kumar | 5–2 | 0.392 |
| 212 | 4 | 14 April 2019 | Johnny Vegas and Anna Richardson | Alex Brooker, **Katherine Ryan** and Sophie Duker | 2–4 | 0.461 |
| 213 | 5 | 21 April 2019 | Lloyd Griffith and Paisley Billings | Tom Read Wilson, **Katherine Ryan** and Angela Barnes | 2–4 | N/A |
| 214 | 6 | 28 April 2019 | Ed Gamble and Liam Charles | Stacey Solomon, **Aisling Bea** and Lou Sanders | 6–2 | 0.461 |
| 215 | 7 | 5 May 2019 | Scarlett Moffatt and Harriet Kemsley | Wes Nelson, **Tom Allen** and Rosie Jones | | 0.444 |
| 216 | 8 | 12 May 2019 | Joe Swash and Suzi Ruffell | Harriet Kemsley, **Josh Widdicombe** and Dotty | | 0.365 |
| 217 | 9 | 19 May 2019 | Fin Taylor and Georgia Toffolo | Kiri Pritchard-McLean, **Aisling Bea** and Kerry Godliman | 2–5 | N/A |
| 218 | 10 | 15 December 2019 | Ola and Emily Atack | Jamie Laing, **Sara Pascoe** and Natasia Demetriou | 4–2 | N/A |
| 219 | 11 | 29 December 2019 (Note: Compilation episode - best of Series 21 (Part 1)) | N/A | N/A | N/A | N/A |
| 220 | 12 | 6 January 2020 (Note: Compilation episode - best of Series 21 (Part 2)) | N/A | N/A | N/A | N/A |

=== Series 22 (2020–21) ===
| No. overall | No. in series | Original air date | Rob's Team | Katherine's Team | Scores | UK viewers (millions) |
|---|---|---|---|---|---|---|
| 221 | 1 | 7 January 2020 | Tom Allen and Sophie Hermann | Sophie Duker and Richard Osman | 3–4 | 0.496 |
| 222 | 2 | 14 January 2020 | Joe Swash and Maisie Adam | Jamali Maddix and Angela Scanlon | | 0.345 |
| 223 | 3 | 21 January 2020 | Phil Wang, Spencer Matthews and Vogue Williams | Nadine Coyle and Kerry Godliman | | 0.374 |
| 224 | 4 | 28 January 2020 | Harriet Kemsley and Gemma Collins | Jordan Stephens and Fin Taylor | 2–3 | N/A (<0.340) (Note: Not reported in the weekly top 15 programmes for four-screen viewer ratings.) |
| 225 | 5 | 4 February 2020 | Joel Dommett and Rosie Jones | Ovie Soko and Catherine Bohart | 4–3 | N/A (<0.317) |
| 226 | 6 | 11 February 2020 | Jessica Knappett and Jamie Laing | Rose Matafeo and Geoff Norcott | 5–3 | 0.392 |
| 227 | 7 | 18 February 2020 | Darren Harriott and Thomas Skinner | Sarah Keyworth and Stacey Solomon | | 0.408 |
| 228 | 8 | 6 December 2020 (Note: Episode filmed earlier in the year before the coronavirus pandemic with a studio audience and no masks or social distancing) | Tom Allen and Liam Charles | Scarlett Moffatt and Maisie Adam | 2–4 | 0.661 (Note: 7-day consolidated; 28-day consolidated rating not available.) |
| 229 | 9 | 13 December 2020 | Ed Gamble, Donna Preston and Verona Rose | Sara Barron and Ranj Singh | | 0.602 |
| 230 | 10 | 20 December 2020 | Paisley Billings and Josh Jones | Tom Read Wilson and Kiri Pritchard-McLean | | 0.501 |
| 231 | 11 | 10 January 2021 (Note: Compilation episode - best of Series 22 (Part 1)) | N/A | N/A | N/A | N/A (<0.336) |
| 232 | 12 | 17 January 2021 (Note: Compilation episode - best of Series 22 (Part 2)) | N/A | N/A | N/A | N/A (<0.403) |

== See also ==
- List of 8 Out of 10 Cats Does Countdown episodes
