= Russell Peters =

Canadian comedian and actor (born 1970)

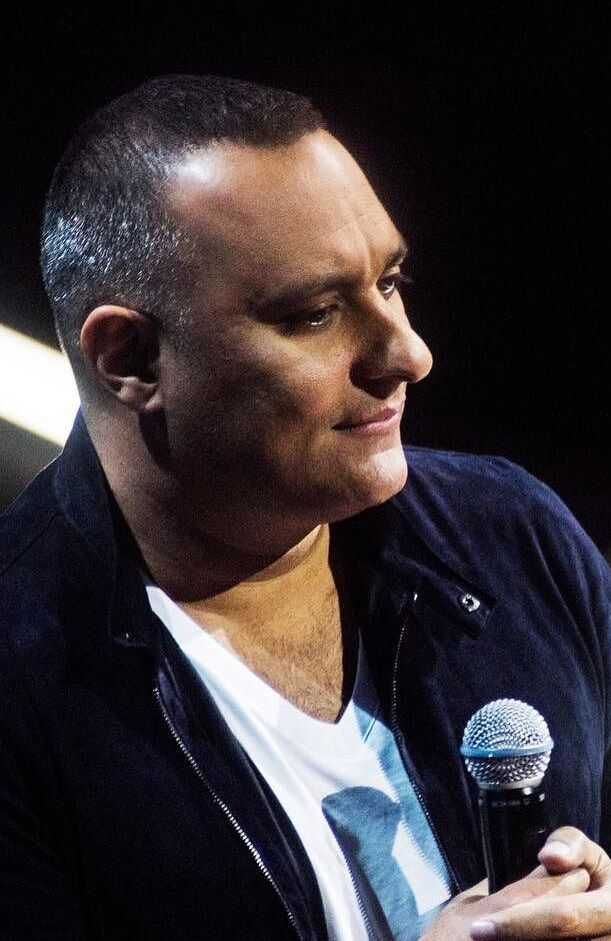
- Peters in 2017
- Born: Russell Dominic Peters; 29 September 1970 (age 56); Toronto, Ontario, Canada
- Spouses: Monica Diaz (m. 2010, divorced) Ali Peters (m. 2022)
- Children: 2

Comedy career
- Years active: 1989–present
- Medium: Stand-up; television; film; radio; books
- Genres: Insult comedy; Heritage comedy; black comedy; observational comedy; satire; improvisational comedy
- Subjects: Racism; race relations; stereotypes; India; multiculturalism; Asian culture; Western culture
- Website: russellpeters.com

Russell Dominic Peters (born 29 September 1970) is a Canadian stand-up comedian, actor, and producer. He began performing in Toronto in 1989 and won a Gemini Award in 2008. In 2013, he was number three on Forbes' list of the world's highest-paid comedians, and became the first comedian to get a Netflix stand-up special. He also won the Peabody Award and the International Emmy Award for Best Arts Programming for producing Hip-Hop Evolution (2016). He lives in Los Angeles.

== Early life ==
Russell Dominic Peters was born on 29 September 1970 in Toronto, Ontario, to immigrant parents from India. His parents Eric and Maureen Peters are of Anglo-Indian descent, who had moved to Canada in 1965 from Jalandhar and Kolkata respectively. His extended family lives in Bhopal, India. Peters was raised Catholic.

When Peters was four, he and his family moved to Brampton. He attended Chinguacousy Secondary School for grades 9–10, before transferring to a trade school as recommended by a guidance counsellor for impulsivity and inattention to North Peel Secondary School in Bramalea for grades 11–12. In school, he was regularly bullied because of his ethnicity. He eventually learned boxing, which helped him resist the bullying. He was undiagnosed for ADHD at the time. Peters also became a fan of hip hop in his youth. By the 1990s, he was a well-connected DJ in the Toronto scene.

Peters's older brother, Clayton Peters, serves as his manager.

== Career ==
Peters began performing in Toronto in 1989. He has since gone on to perform in several countries.

In 1992, Peters met American comedian George Carlin, one of his biggest influences, who advised him to get on stage whenever and wherever possible. Peters said he "took that advice to heart, and I think that's the reason I am where I am now." In 2007, 15 years later, he hosted one of Carlin's last shows before the comedian's death the following year.

On 28 September 2013, Peters was awarded the 2013 Trailblazer award by the Association of South Asians in Media, Marketing and Entertainment (ASAMME) for good contributions to comedy. He is among the first South Asian Americans to achieve international success in the field.

In 2017, Peters made an appearance on Top Gear America in the third episode of season 1 as one of the guests.

According to Forbes, Peters earned an estimated $15 million between June 2009 and June 2010, continuing his run as one of the highest-paid comedians, after earning an estimated $5 million the prior year. Forbes ranked him as the seventh-highest-paid comedian. In 2013, he earned $21 million, according to Forbes' estimate.

=== Notable performances ===
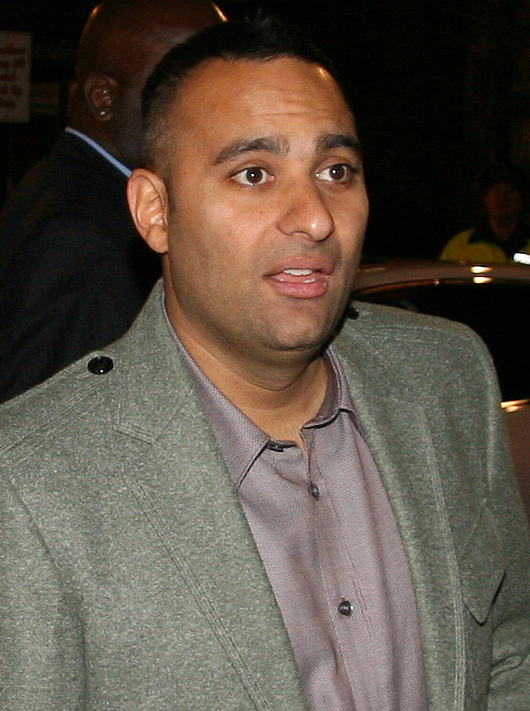
Peters at the 2008 Toronto International Film Festival

==== Comedy Now! special ====
Peters credits the turning point in his career to his 2004 special on the Canadian TV show Comedy Now!, which was uploaded onto YouTube, where it became popular. While the initial video upload featured his entire 45-minute performance, YouTube users subsequently uploaded segments of the performance in which Peters focused on individual cultural groups. According to Peters, those segments were seen by the targeted cultural groups and were well received by them. The video and its viral nature was referred to by Peters on his performance, Outsourced; when the audience cheered when he referred to earlier jokes. He has also been the one to tell the !Xobile story, and he exclaimed, "Look at you, you filthy downloaders!"

==== Others ====
In 2007, Peters was the first comedian to sell out Toronto's Air Canada Centre, selling more than 16,000 tickets in two days for the single show. He ended up selling more than 30,000 tickets nationally over the two-day sales period. He broke a UK comedy sales record at London's O2 Arena when he sold over 16,000 tickets to his show in 2009. His show in Sydney on 15 May 2010 had an audience of 13,880, making it the largest stand-up comedy show ever in Australia. Peters's performances on 5–6 May 2012 in Singapore also set attendance records for a single stand-up comedian at the Singapore Indoor Stadium.

Peters hosted the Canada Day Comedy Festival 2006, and participated in a USO tour of Iraq, Afghanistan, Germany, Africa and Greenland in November 2007 with Wilmer Valderrama and Mayra Veronica. He also produced and starred in the radio situation comedy series Monsoon House on CBC Radio One.

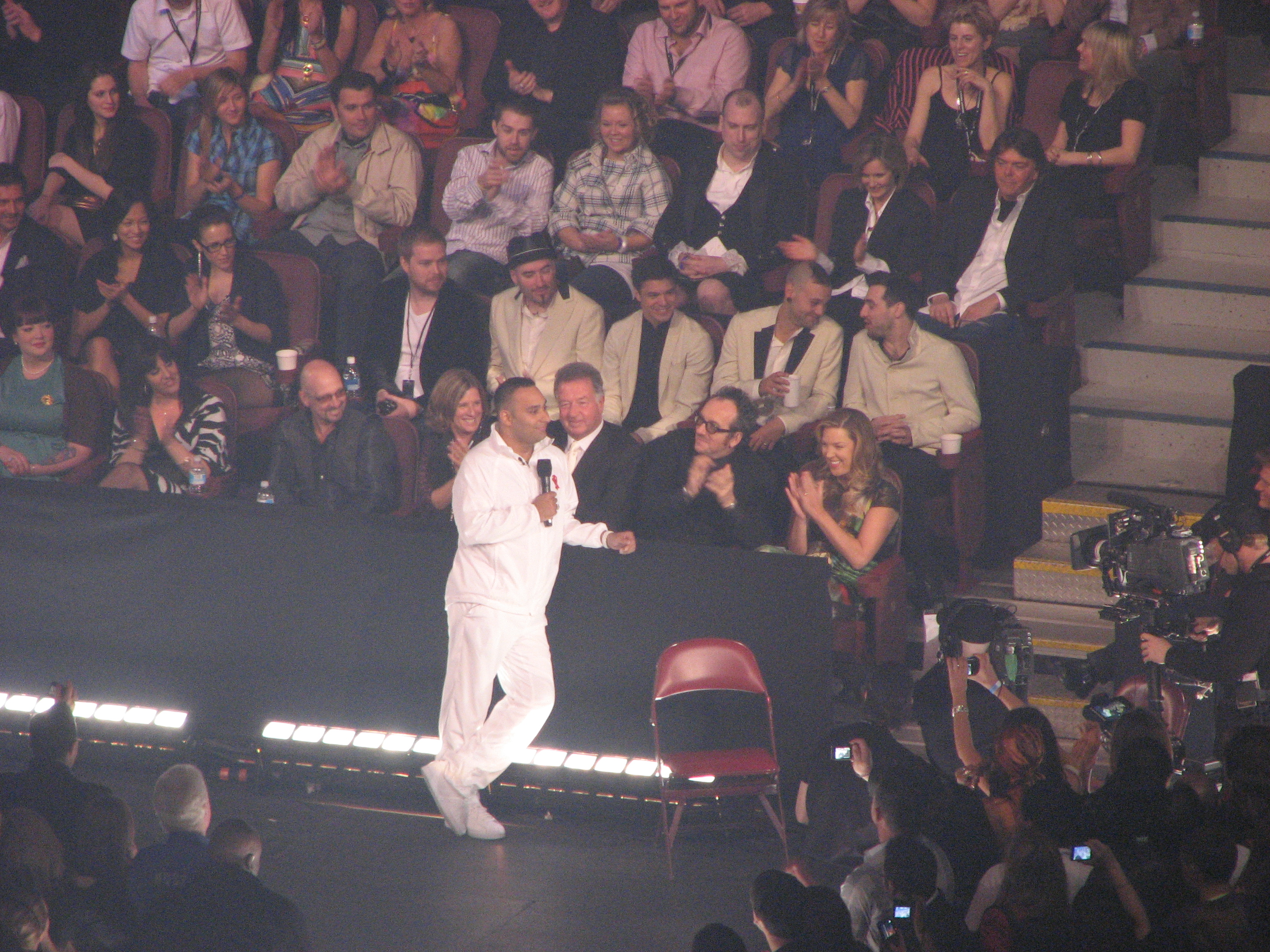
Peters hosting the Juno Awards 2009

Peters was the host of the televised 2008 Juno Awards ceremonies in Calgary on 6 April 2008, for which he won a Gemini Award for "Best Performance or Host in a Variety Program or Series." The show received the second-highest ratings of any Juno Awards broadcast. Following the show's success, Peters accepted an invitation to host the Juno Awards for a second consecutive year; the 2009 Juno Awards took place in Vancouver on 29 March 2009.

He started his RELAX World Tour in November 2024 in the United States and subsequently performing in other parts of the world. The tour is anticipated to end in June 2025 with the last show in Las Vegas.

In 2025, Peters performed as a headliner in Saudi Arabia's Riyadh Comedy Festival, an event taking place from September 26th to October 9th. The comedy festival overlaps with the seventh anniversary of the assassination of Jamal Khashoggi, prompting Joey Shea, Saudi Arabia researcher at Human Rights Watch, to say in a statement that the Saudi government is using the comedy festival to whitewash its human rights abuses. Peters has performed in the region before, having spoken of his experience performing for Saudi royalty in a 2017 episode of Comedy Central's series, This is Not Happening.

=== DVDs and book ===
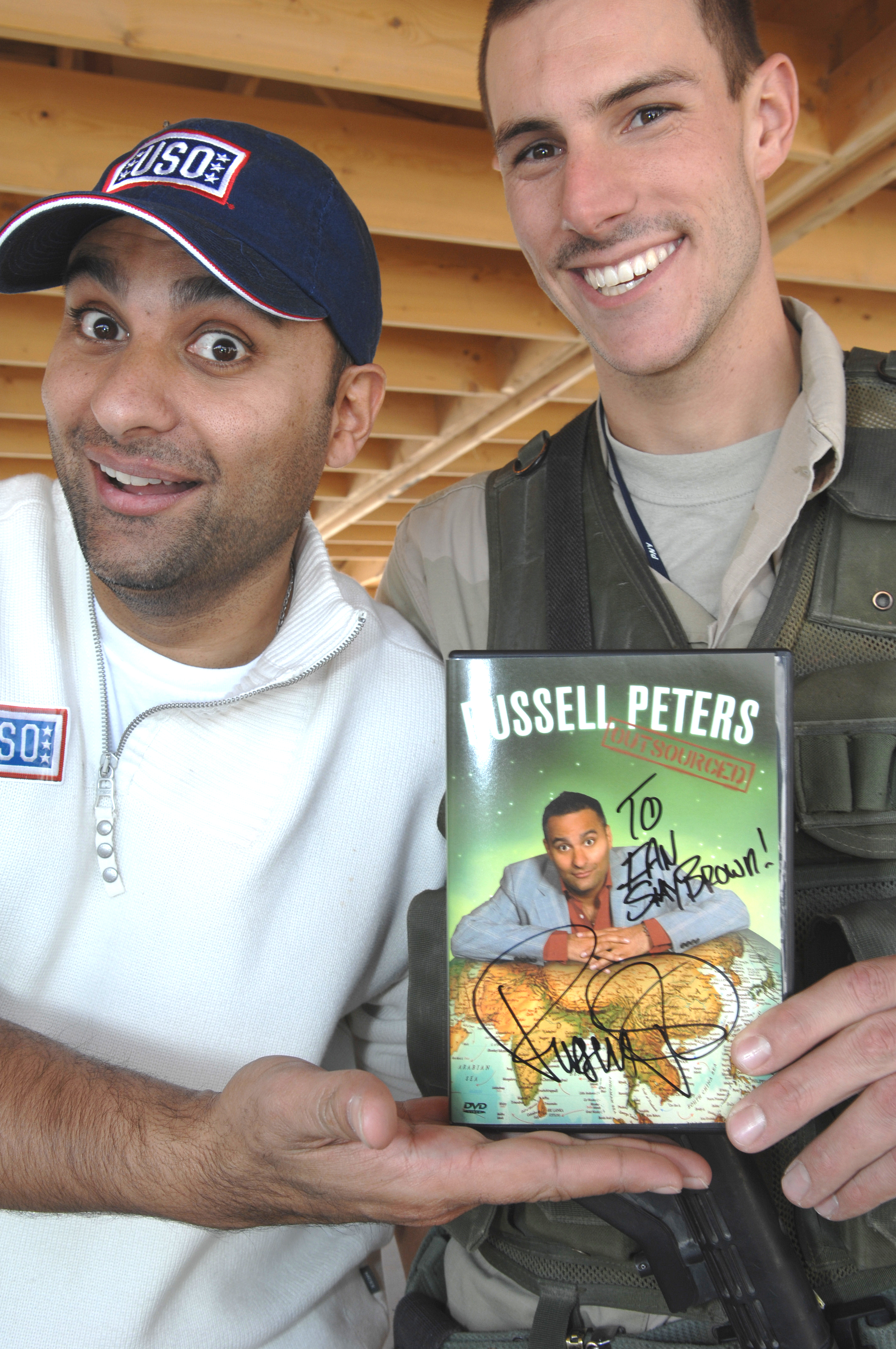
Russell Peters in Afghanistan on a USO tour (November 2007)

Peters released his debut comedy album, Outsourced, of his performance aired on Comedy Central on 26 August 2006. The DVD version is uncensored; it has sold more than 100,000 copies, and remained on the National DVD Chart over one and a half years after its release.

Peters released a second DVD/CD combo, Red, White and Brown, in Canada in 2008, and in the U.S. in early 2009. It was recorded on 2 February 2008, at the WaMu Theatre in New York City's Madison Square Garden. It was self-produced and financed by Peters and his brother Clayton.

On 26 October 2010, Peters published his autobiography, Call Me Russell, co-written with his brother, Clayton, and Dannis Koromilas.

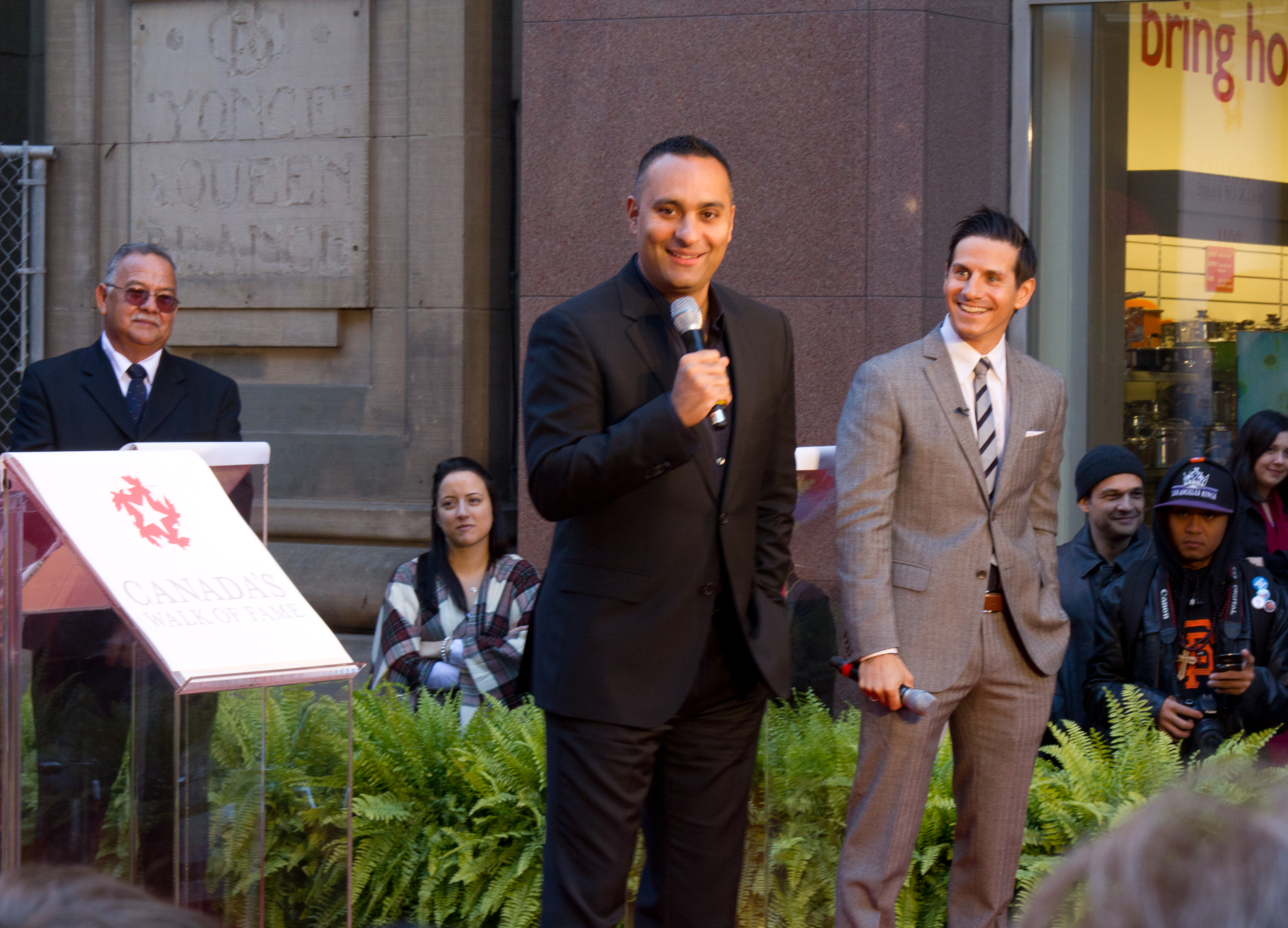
Peters at Canada's Walk of Fame 2011

In May 2011, Peters released The Green Card Tour: Live from the O2 Arena, a live performance recorded in front of a total audience of 30,000, over two nights at O2 Arena in London, England. Also in 2011, Peters received a star on Canada's Walk of Fame.

== Comedic style ==
Peters's stand-up performances feature observational comedy, using humour to highlight racial, ethnic, class and cultural stereotypes. He often refers to his own experiences growing up in an Anglo-Indian family, and impersonates the accents of various ethnic groups to poke fun at them. As he told an audience in San Francisco, "I don't make the stereotypes, I just see them." In a 2006 interview with The National, Peters observed that he did not intend to put down or offend different races and cultures, but tried to "raise them up through humour".

Peters is widely known for his punchline, "Somebody gonna get a hurt real bad." It ends a joke he tells about his childhood with a traditional Indian father, who used corporal punishment on his sons. Another punchline he uses is "Be a man! Do the right thing!", which relates to a story of a Chinese man trying to get him to pay more for an item at a shop.

== Personal life ==
Peters lives in Los Angeles, California, and owns two homes there. He also owns homes in Las Vegas Valley, Nevada, and Vaughan, Ontario.

In 2010, Peters established the Russell Peters North Peel Scholarship, an award worth up to CA$21,000 and intended to finance up to three years of college. It will be awarded annually to a student from Judith Nyman Secondary School (formerly North Peel) with a strong academic record and the intention of attending college.

Peters has been a practitioner of Brazilian jiu-jitsu since 2015, and was promoted to purple belt by Jean Jacques Machado in 2025.

=== Relationships ===
Peters dated Karenjit Kaur Vohra, a pornographic actress known by her stage name Sunny Leone; the couple broke up in 2007. Peters proposed to girlfriend Monica Diaz on 10 July 2010, at the Los Angeles International Airport and announced their engagement via Twitter. The couple married on 20 August 2010, at A Little White Wedding Chapel in Las Vegas, Nevada. The wedding was attended by about 20 guests, including an Elvis impersonator. Soon after, Peters told The Canadian Press that Diaz was pregnant, saying, "Did I get married because she was knocked up? I would say that expedited it." Their daughter, Crystianna Marie Peters, was born two months early on 14 December 2010. In a March 2012 interview, Peters revealed that he and Diaz were divorcing.

In October 2016, it was announced that Peters was engaged to Ruzanna Khetchian. After the engagement was called off, Peters announced on 4 December 2018, via Twitter, that he and his new girlfriend Jennifer Andrade were expecting a child. Andrade was the Miss Universe Honduras in 2012. In April 2019 it was announced that Andrade had given birth to a boy, whom they named Russell Santiago Peters. His relationship with Andrade ended in 2020.

On 20 February 2022, Peters married Ali Peters at the Ritz Carlton in Dana Point, California.

=== Religious beliefs ===
When interviewer Larry King asked Peters, "Is there such a thing as too taboo?", Peters replied, "I don't talk about religion because I think people are a little weird about religion, especially nowadays, and I'm more of a science guy than I am a beliefs guy. I'm more into facts than I am into beliefs." Peters is an atheist.

== Works ==
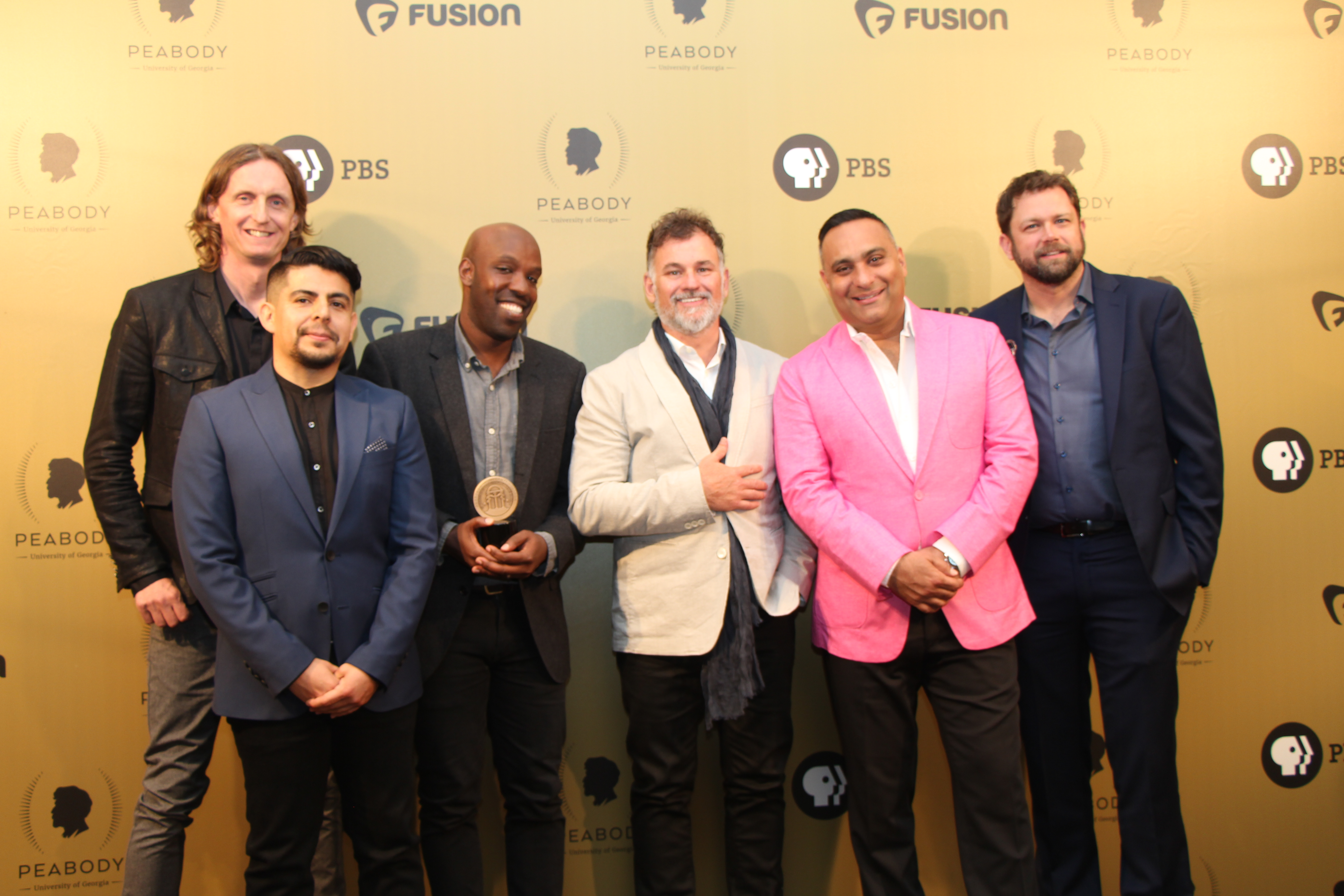
Peters, along with Scot McFadyen, Rodrigo Bascuñán, Shad, Sam Dunn, and Darby Wheeler, at the Peabody Awards.

Russell Peters has appeared in many films. Earlier in his career, he had cameo roles in Boozecan (1994) as Snake's Friend, Tiger Claws III (2000) as Detective Elliott, My Baby's Daddy (2004) as the obstetrician, and Quarter Life Crisis (2006) as Dilip Kumar.

He appeared in Senior Skip Day (2008), which starred Larry Miller, Tara Reid, and Gary Lundy. That year he was also in The Take (2008) as Dr. Sharma.

He acted in the Punjabi-Canadian film Breakaway (2011), alongside Rob Lowe, Camilla Belle, Anupam Kher, and Vinay Virmani. That year he also acted in Duncan Jones's Source Code (2011) as Max, an amateur comedian with a bad attitude; and as Pervius in National Lampoon's 301: The Legend of Awesomest Maximus (2011).

Peters has guest-starred on the TV series Mr. D as the school superintendent. In 2011, he starred in a Canadian TV Christmas special, A Russell Peters Christmas. Guests included Michael Bublé, Pamela Anderson, and Jon Lovitz. The show attracted the most viewers of any CTV Canadian holiday special.

== Filmography ==
=== Film ===
Year	Title	Role	Notes
1994	Boozecan	Snake's Friend	
2000	Tiger Claws III	Det. Elliot	
2004	My Baby's Daddy	Obstetrician	
2006	Quarter Life Crisis	Dilip Kumar	
2006	Russell Peters: Two Concerts, One Ticket	Himself	Video documentary
2007	The Take	Dr. Sharma	
2007	Let's All Hate Toronto	Himself	Documentary
2007	Heckler	Himself	Documentary
2008	Senior Skip Day	Uncle Todd	Video
2010	The Con Artist	Pogue	
2011	Source Code	Max Denoff	
2011	The Legend of Awesomest Maximus	Pervius	
2011	Breakaway	Sonu Singh	
2011	Walter & Tandoori's Christmas	Tandoori	Voice; English version
2011	New Year's Eve	Chef Sunil	
2011	Bobby Khan's Ticket to Hollywood	Jack the Store Manager	
2012	Girl in Progress	Emile	
2012	Yak: The Giant King	Zork	Voice; English version
2013	My Date with Hugh	Himself	Documentary
2013	TBS Who Gets the Last Laugh: Baby Goats	Himself	Video Short
2014	Chef	Miami Cop	
2014	Ribbit	Deepak	Voice; English version
2014	Meet the Patels	Himself	Documentary
2014	Wings: Sky Force Heroes - Bringing the Characters to Life	Himself	Video Short
2014	Delivery	Himself	Documentary
2014	Lennon or McCartney	Himself	Documentary Short
2014	Wings: Sky Force Heroes	Jumbo/Boss Man	Voice
2015	Being Canadian	Himself	Documentary
2016	Fifty Shades of Black	Dean Jordan	
2016	The Jungle Book	Rocky the Indian Rhinoceros	Voice
2017	The Clapper	Stillerman	
2017	Ripped	Harris	
2017	Adventures in Public School	Mr. Germaine	
2018	Supercon	Keith Mahar	
2020	The Opening Act	Randy	
2021	Clifford the Big Red Dog	Malik	
2023	Outlaw Johnny Black	Big Chief	
2023	Drop the Needle	Himself	Documentary
2023	Taking Back the Groove	N/A	Documentary short Executive producer
TBA	Street Justice	Hasidic	Pre-production
TBA	Don't Suck	Himself	
TBA	Collateral Data	Luqman	
TBA	Wingman	Kazzim	

=== Television ===
Year	Title	Role	Notes
1990	Comedy at Club 54	Himself	TV series
1997	Live at Jongleurs	Himself	Episode: "Episode #1.5"
1997	Comedy Now!	Himself	Episode: "Russell Peters: Show Me the Funny!"
1997	Just for Laughs	Himself	TV series
1999	The Big Stage	Himself	Episode: "Episode #1.2"
1999	Festival of Fun	Himself	Episode: "Episode #2.2"
2001–02	Network East Late	Himself/host	TV series
2003	Lord Have Mercy!	Ryan Sarma	Episode: "Deranged Marriage"
2003–08	Just for Laughs	Himself	3 episodes
2006	CBC Winnipeg Comedy Festival	Himself/host	Episode: "No Place Like Home"
2006–09	Comics Unleashed	Himself	2 episodes
2007	Video on Trial	Himself	Episode: "Episode #3.3"
2007	Pulse: The Desi Beat	Himself	Episode: "Episode #1.9"
2008	Juno Awards	Himself/host	TV special
2008	Def Comedy Jam	Himself	Episode: "Episode #8.4"
2008	Comics Without Borders	Himself/host	TV series
2009	Juno Awards	Himself/host	TV special
2009	Russell Peters Presents	Himself/host	TV special Documentary
2009	Angelo Tsarouchas: Bigger Is Better	N/A	Executive producer
2010	The Dating Guy	Himself	Voice; Episode: "20,000 VJ's Under the Sea"
2011	A Day in the Life	Himself	Episode: "Russell Peters"
2011	26th Gemini Awards	Himself/host	TV special
2011	8 Out of 10 Cats	Himself	Episode: #12.9
2011	A Russell Peters Christmas Special	Himself/host	TV special
2012	Red Light Comedy: Live from Amsterdam	Himself/host	
2012	The Burn with Jeff Ross	Himself	Episode: "Gilbert Gottfried/Russell Peters/Marc Maron/John Stamos"
2012	Just for Laughs: All-Access	Himself/host	Episode: "Episode #5.2"
2012	Bob's Burgers	Tran	Voice; Episode: "Moody Foodie"
2012	Are We There Yet?	Toby Palmer	Episode: "The Nick Gets an Assistant Episode"
2013	Top Chef Canada	Himself	Episode: "The Indian Feast"
2013	Who Gets the Last Laugh?	Himself	Episode: "Gregg "Opie" Hughes vs. Russell Peters vs. Paul Rodriguez"
2013	Mr. D	Jody Green	Episode: "Gerry's Evaluation"
2013	Russell Peters Vs. the World	Himself	TV series documentary
2013	Off Season: The Lex Morrison Story	Romulus	TV movie
2014	Russell Peters & Friends	Himself/host	TV special
2014	Last Comic Standing	Himself/Judge	Season 8
2014	Grumpy Cat's Worst Christmas Ever	Santa	TV movie
2015	Just for Laughs: 15 Years of Gags	Himself	TV special
2015	World's Funniest	Himself/Panelist	Episode: "Gravity: It Kinda Sucks"
2015	Pop Culture Underground	Himself	Episode: "Comedy"
2015	Spun Out	Ray	Episode: "My Brother's Speaker"
2015	Codename: Dragon	Hacker Ted	TV movie Co-producer
2015	Royal Canadian Air Farce	Dr. Malcolm Sidwell	Episode: "Air Farce New Year's Eve 2015"
2016	Family Guy	Padma's Father	Voice; Episode: "Road to India"
2016	BoJack Horseman	Driver	Voice; Episode: "The BoJack Horseman Show"
2016	Life in Pieces	Dr. Tak Oh	2 episodes
2016	The Punchline - Where Comedy Hurts	N/A	Executive producer
2016–2020	Hip-Hop Evolution	—N/a	16 episodes
2016	This Is Not Happening	Himself	Episode: "Adventure"; Writer
2016	Dying Laughing	Himself	
2016	Lip Sync Battle	Himself	Episode: "CeeLo Green vs. Russell Peters"
2017	Howie Mandel All-Star Comedy Gala	Himself	
2017	Juno Awards	Himself/co-host	
2017	Wild 'n Out	Himself	
2017	The Problem with Apu	Himself	Documentary film
2017	Big in Finland	Himself	Episode 4: "Näyttiks se siltä et mul on iso kyrpä?"
2017	Man of a Funny Age	Himself	
2017	The Indian Detective	Douglass D'Mello	Executive producer
2018	A Little Help with Carol Burnett	Co-host	
2019	Corner Gas Animated	Gavin	Voice; Season 2, episode 8: "Bush League"
2020	Gander	Himself	
2021	Partners in Rhyme	Theo	Season 2, episode 8: "All Ready"
2021–present	Roast Battle Canada	Himself	Judge
2022	Cooking with the Stars	Himself	
2022	House Out Of Order	Mr.Arjun	Season 1, episode 7: "Meet the Parent"
2023	The Neighborhood	Joe	Season 5, episode 13: "Welcome to the Last Dance"
2023-2024	Velma	Aman Dinkley	Voice
2024–present	Late Bloomer	N/A	Executive producer

=== Comedy specials ===
Year	Title	Distributor	Notes
2006	Outsourced	Warner Bros. Records	Executive producer
2008	Red, White and Brown	Warner Music Canada	Executive producer
2011	The Green Card Tour: Live from the O2 Arena	Warner Music Canada	Executive producer
2013	Notorious	Netflix	Executive producer
2016	Almost Famous	Netflix	Executive producer
2020	Deported	Amazon Prime Video	Executive producer
2024	Act your Age Live in Abu Dhabi	Patreon	Streamed on Patreon on December 5, 2024; now available on YouTube

=== Bibliography ===
- 2010. Call Me Russell. Random House Digital, Inc. ISBN 0-385-66965-8.

== Awards and nominations ==
Russell Peters awards and nominations
Awards and nominations
Award	Wins	Nominations
Totals
ASAMME	1	1
Canadian Comedy Awards	2	9
Gemini Awards	1	6
Peabody Award	1	1
International Emmy Award	1	1
Wins	6
Nominations	17

Year	Nominated work	Award	Category	Result
1997	Comics!	Gemini Award	Best Performance in a Comedy Program or Series	Nominated
2003	Russell Peters	Canadian Comedy Award	Best Male Stand-Up	Nominated
2004	Russell Peters	Canadian Comedy Award	Best Male Stand-Up	Nominated
2004	Comedy Now!	Gemini Award	Best Individual Performance in a Comedy Program or Series	Nominated
2007	Russell Peters	Canadian Comedy Award	Dave Broadfoot Award	Won
2008	Russell Peters	Canadian Comedy Award	Canadian Comedy Person of the Year	Nominated
2008	Russell Peters	Canadian Comedy Award	Best Large Venue Stand-Up	Won
2008	Juno Awards – as host	Gemini Award	Best Performance or Host in a Variety Program or Series	Won
2009	Russell Peters	Canadian Comedy Award	Canadian Comedy Person of the Year	Nominated
2009	Juno Awards – as host	Gemini Award	Best Performance or Host in a Variety Program or Series	Nominated
2010	Russell Peters	Canadian Comedy Award	Canadian Comedy Person of the Year	Nominated
2011	Russell Peters	Canadian Comedy Award	Canadian Comedy Person of the Year	Nominated
2012	A Russell Peters Christmas Special – with Clayton Peters, Luciano Casimiri, Kristeen von Hagen, Jean Paul	Canadian Comedy Award	Best Writing in a Television Program or Series	Nominated
2013	A Russell Peters Christmas Special – with Clayton Peters, Luciano Casimiri, Kristeen von Hagen, Jean Paul	Gemini Award	Best Writing in a Variety or Sketch Comedy Program or Series	Nominated
2013	Russell Peters	Association of South Asians in Media, Marketing and Entertainment	Trailblazer Award	Won
2016	Hip-Hop Evolution – as producer	Peabody Award	Peabody Award	Won
2017	Hip-Hop Evolution – as producer	International Emmy Award	Best Arts Programming	Won
