= Outsourced =

Outsourcing is the practice of contracting a business function to a third party.

Outsourced may also refer to:

- Outsourced (album), a comedy album by Russell Peters
- Outsourced (film), 2006 romantic comedy by John Jeffcoat set in India
  - Outsourced (TV series), 2010 sitcom television series based on the film
