= Raef Bjayou =

British entrepreneur

- Born: Raphael Bjayou. 8 June 1980 (age 46); London
- Occupations: Entrepreneur, TV Presenter, Public Speaker, Campaigner
- Years active: 2006—Present

Raphael Bjayou (born 8 June 1980) is a British entrepreneur and television presenter who was fired in week 9 during series 4 of The Apprentice.

== Education ==
Bjayou was educated at two independent schools in Hertfordshire: at Westbrook Hay School in Hemel Hempstead, where he was school captain, and then Haileybury and Imperial Service College in Hertford Heath (near Hertford). He later attended the University of Exeter, where he studied History and Politics and was a committee member of the university's debating society.

== Life and career ==
After graduating from University, Bjayou spent some time in Ethiopia engaged in work for the charity, The Addis Ababa Irrigation Project. He spent just over a year there before spending a further year in the British Virgin Islands, selling property. After returning to the UK, he immediately set to work establishing his own import and export company distributing, at first, magazines from the US and then furniture from the Far East. This quickly led to pharmaceutical distribution in Africa, namely the West African countries of Gambia and Senegal. The principal product in this distribution portfolio is a home HIV testing kit, which Raef hopes will one day be distributed throughout the continent.

== The Apprentice ==
Bjayou struggled in the first episode of the series, getting called back to the boardroom after misidentifying some fish, but he led his team to victory in the next task and soon became one of the favourites to win. He became popular for his distinctive dapper appearance, mannerisms, and sayings such as "The spoken word is my tool", as well as his defence of Sara Dhada when other candidates in the house ganged up on her. He also earned praise from Sir Alan Sugar as a "really nice chap", and Bjayou in turn claims to have an e-mail "rapport" with Sir Alan.

== Post-Apprentice ==
After being dismissed in Week 9 of the show, he suggested to the press that he would like to pursue a career in the media. To this end, he has appeared in an episode of the comedy panel show, 8 out of 10 Cats and was a reporter for the Richard & Judy show. He was a contestant on the second series of The Underdog Show, but was eliminated in the fifth week and has also appeared on Ready Steady Cook, where he beat fellow Apprentice contestant Claire Young. Raef took part in Come Dine with Me, where his friend Ben Duncan (who later competed in Big Brother) cooked some of his food for him and the pair also took part in TV series Celebrity Coach Trip. In 2011 he turned his hand to acting with a small role in an episode of the BBC children's show M.I. High. In 2012 Raef appeared in an episode of Celebrity Wedding Planner on Channel 5 where he planned a wedding for a young couple alongside fellow Apprentice star Stuart Baggs.

In 2014, Raef founded Zephyr:Media, a multi-platform PR, arts and media portal based in Mayfair, London.

== Selected filmography ==
Year	Title	Role	Notes
2008	The Apprentice	Candidate	
2008	8 Out of 10 Cats	Panellist	
2008	The Underdog Show	Contestant	
2008	Celebrity Come Dine with Me	Contestant	
2008	What's On in London, for British Airways In-Flight Entertainment	Host	
2008	The Lorraine Kelly Show	Guest	
2008	The Wright Stuff	Guest	
2008	Richard & Judy	VoxPops Interviewer	
2008	Tonight	Guest Presenter	
2008	Britain's Best Dish	Guest	
2008	The Alan Titchmarsh Show	Guest	
2008	Ready Steady Cook	Guest	Winner
2008	Daily Cooks' Challenge	Celebrity Cook	
2008	It Pays to Watch!	Guest	Golden Pig Winner
2009	Tonight	Guest Presenter	
2009	Fifth Gear	Guest	
2009	Celebrity Juice	Guest	
2009	Hell's Kitchen	Dinner Guest	
2009	BBC Breakfast	Guest	
2009	Newsnight	Guest Interviewee	
2009	Big Brother's Big Mouth	Guest	
2009	Tonightly	Guest	
