= Ola (comedian) =

- Born: Olawale Gbaja-Biamila; 5 August 1987 (age 39)
- Education: The London School of Economics and Political Science
- Occupations: comedian, writer, actor
- Years active: 2006–present
- Website: olathecomedian.com

Idris Olawale Gbaja-Biamila (born 5 August 1987), known as Ola The Comedian or simply Ola, is a Nigerian British stand-up comedian, writer and actor based in England.

== Early life ==
Ola was born in 1987.

== Career ==
His first gig was for the Aston University African-Caribbean Society in 2006. The next year he released 21, a self-published comedy DVD.

Ola has appeared on Plebs and 8 Out of 10 Cats, and was a finalist on ITV4's Search for A Stand Up Hero. He has written for The Now Show, The News Quiz and Nathan Caton’s Can’t Tell Me Nothing.

== Personal life ==
Ola is a devout Christian, and works Christian themes into his stand-up.
