= The Underdog Show =

- Created by: Fenia Vardanis
- Starring: Host: Julian Clary
- Country of origin: United Kingdom
- No. of seasons: 2

Production
- Running time: Main show: 1 hour Results show :30 minutes CBBC show 30 minutes

Original release
- Network: BBC Two
- Release: 20 March 2007 – 4 December 2008

The Underdog Show is a six-week television series presented by Julian Clary and his dog, Valerie. The series was produced by the independent production company Splash Media.

== Format ==
The show on BBC2 featured celebrities Julia Sawalha, Anton du Beke, Clive Anderson, Huey Morgan, Mishal Husain, Selina Scott, Kirsty Gallacher and Theo Paphitis pairing up with untrained rescue dogs for a Crufts-style competition. Every week, one duo was eliminated by a panel of three professional judges Kay Laurence, Annie Clayton and Peter Purves and the viewers via telephone voting. The outgoing dog being put up for adoption to find a new home with a viewer, although Theo, Kirsty, and Clive adopted the rescue dogs they were paired with.

Steve Mann of Alpha Dog training School was the successful trainer of eventual winners, Selina and Chump. Steve Mann, a full-time professional Dog Trainer is considered one of the best dog trainers in the UK.

A spin off show on CBBC replaced the celebrities with eight children paired up with eight rescue dogs and eight professional dog trainers.

Celebrity	Dog's name	Status/(end result)
Theo Paphitis	Claudia	Eliminated (8th)
Kirsty Gallacher	Bruno	Eliminated (7th)
Anton du Beke	Ginger	Eliminated (6th)
Clive Anderson	Albert	Eliminated (5th)
Mishal Husain	Robson	Eliminated (4th)
Julia Sawalha	Cookie	Third
Huey Morgan	Casper	Runner Up
Selina Scott	Chump	Winner

The numbers in brackets e.g. (8th) denote the final position the celebrity finished in, not the order they were eliminated.

== Series 2 ==
A second series aired on Living instead of BBC Two. It was hosted by Tara Palmer-Tomkinson and Mark Durden-Smith.

Raef, Jason, Brian and Kevin all adopted the dogs that they were paired with.

Celebrity	Dog's Name	Status/(End Result)
Javine Hylton	Bouncer	Eliminated (10th)
MC Harvey	Gambler	Eliminated (9th)
Ninia Benjamin	Sushi	Eliminated (8th)
Lesley Joseph	Louise	Eliminated (7th)
Raef Bjayou	Suz	Eliminated (6th)
Elize du Toit	Gloria	Eliminated (5th)
Jason Wood	Jim	Eliminated (4th)
Camilla Dallerup	Chico	Third
Brian Blessed	Dougal	Runner Up
Kevin Sacre	Sven	Winner

The numbers in brackets e.g. (10th) denote the final position the celebrity finished in, not the order they were eliminated.
