= Pound (magazine) =

Canadian hip hop magazine

- Editor: Rodrigo Bascunan
- Categories: Canadian magazines Music
- Frequency: Quarterly
- Circulation: 30,000
- Publisher: Rodrigo Bascunan, Michael Evans
- First issue: December 1999
- Final issue Number: 2010; 45
- Company: Pound Magazine Corporation
- Country: Canada
- Language: English
- Website: poundmag.com

Pound was a Toronto-based hip-hop magazine that was distributed for free across Canada. Founded in 1998 and beginning publication in December 1999, Pound was published quarterly. It ceased publishing in 2010, after releasing its 45th issue.

== History ==
Pound was founded by Rodrigo Bascunan, Andrew Cappell, Kostas Pagiamtzis and Christian Pearce in May 1998. Its current editor is Rodrigo Bascunan. Since its inception, the magazine was known for its sense of humor and political content, specifically the "Babylon System" column that would eventually spawn a book. The magazine has featured many luminaries in its pages, often highlighting artists before their big breaks. Pound has won the Canadian Urban Music Awards (CUMA) Publication of The Year in 2004 and 2005. The awards have not been handed out since.

Pound Magazine Latin America was founded by Javier Carmona in Chile, the first issue in Spanish was released in Santiago de Chile on 1 January 2010. Pound Magazine LA released 3 issues, the first cover was Kanye West, the second one was with DJ Khaled. In this issue, Pound won "Gold Medal" in AUSTRALIS 2010, Best quality print Magazine in Chile. The last print issue was with Cypress Hill on the cover.
