= Red, White and Brown =

Live album by Russell Peters
- Released: September 30, 2008
- Recorded: February 2, 2008
- Genre: Comedy
- Length: 57:27
- Label: Warner Music
- Producer: Russell Peters (exec.), Clayton Peters (exec.), Marco Polo

Russell Peters chronology
Outsourced (2006)	Red, White and Brown (2008)	The Green Card Tour: Live from the O2 Arena (2011)

Professional ratings
Review scores
Source	Rating
Allmusic	(favorable)
PopMatters	(7/10)

Red, White and Brown is the second stand-up comedy album by Canadian comedian Russell Peters, recorded at the WAMU Theatre at Madison Square Garden in New York City, on February 2, 2008. It originally aired on Showtime and later on Comedy Central. The CD/DVD was released in Canada on September 30, 2008, and in the U.S. on January 27, 2009, debuting at #3 on the Canadian Albums Chart. The hip hop theme music was produced by Marco Polo, and legendary MC Melle Mel introduced Peters to the stage.

== Description ==
The DVD includes two hours of bonus features, such as deleted content and commentary. One of the extras is titled "White Jacket Bootleg", which features Peters' brother Clayton, as well as director Jigar Talati, which further reflects Peters' comedic style.

Red, White and Brown continues the theme of targeting racial stereotypes in a comedic fashion. Like his debut album, Peters also imitates various accents for greater comedic effect. He also uses improv to engage his audience and improve the quality of his performance. One difference on this album, however, is that it involves Peters' self-reflection on his trip to India. Peters describes how he went on the plane with Indian pride but "turned Canadian" as soon as he stepped off the plane. This further leads to more observations regarding race and culture.

== Track listing ==
1. "Intro" – 1:47
2. "DDR" – 5:45
3. "Arabs in the House" – 1:47
4. "Blame the Media" – 3:24
5. "Cheap Indians, Pt. 2" – 4:23
6. "Louis Vuitton" – 5:58
7. "Italians" – 3:18
8. "Race vs. Culture" – 9:06
9. "Body Hair" – 7:42
10. "Big Dicks" – 5:49
11. "World Cup" – 2:36
12. "Latinos" – 1:26
13. "Deaf People" – 4:26

== Chart positions ==
Chart (2008)	Peak position
Canadian Albums Chart	3

== Release history ==
Region	Date
Canada	September 30, 2008
United States	January 27, 2009
