= Hip-Hop Evolution =

- Genre: Documentary
- Developed by: Banger Films
- Directed by: Darby Wheeler, Rodrigo Bascunan
- Presented by: Shad
- Country of origin: Canada
- Original language: English
- No. of seasons: 4
- No. of episodes: 16

Production
- Producers: Darby Wheeler, Rodrigo Bascunan, Russell Peters, Scot McFadyen, Sam Dunn, Nelson George

Original release
- Network: HBO Canada
- Release: April 29, 2016 – 25 September 2016
- Network: Netflix
- Release: 19 October 2018 – present

Hip-Hop Evolution is a Canadian music documentary television series that originally aired on HBO Canada in 2016. Hosted by Juno Award-winning artist Shad, the series profiles the history of hip-hop music through interviews with many of the genre's leading cultural figures. The series is produced by Darby Wheeler, Rodrigo Bascuñán, Russell Peters, Scot McFadyen, Sam Dunn and Nelson George. It won the 2016 Peabody Award, and the 2017 International Emmy Award for Best Arts Programming.

The series was screened at the 2016 Hot Docs Canadian International Documentary Festival before being picked up for broadcast by HBO. In December 2016, it was added to Netflix for international distribution.

== Content ==
Hip-Hop Evolution features in-depth, personal interviews with the progenitors of DJing, rapping, and production, culminating in what is now taken to be hip hop music and rap, adding to the existing understanding of hip-hop's earliest decades. Such original artists, producers, DJs, and promoters include: DJ Kool Herc, Coke La Rock, Grandmaster Flash and The Furious Five, Fab Five Freddy, Marley Marl, Afrika Bambaataa, Kool Moe Dee, Kurtis Blow, Doug E. Fresh, Whodini, Warp 9, DJ Hollywood, Spoonie Gee, The Sugarhill Gang, Russell Simmons, Slick Rick, LL Cool J, Rick Rubin, Dana Dane, Vanilla Ice, Public Enemy, Michael Jackson, Perri "Pebbles" Reid, Jermaine Dupri & The Fat Boys.

The first episode documents the history of the inceptive hip-hop party at 1520 Sedgwick Avenue in The Bronx where DJ Kool Herc, who thus emerged as a godfather of the tradition, DJed his sister's birthday party.

The series went on to feature some of the most influential artists of the genre, without whom its current form would not exist, such as Public Enemy, Beastie Boys, N.W.A, Ice-T, Rakim, Big Daddy Kane and LL Cool J, as well as documenting Schoolly D, from Philadelphia, as the influence for gangsta rap on the West Coast, as told by the words of Ice T. It limits its telling of the history at that point, as it documents that was the turning point in which Hip Hop had turned from an underground movement within music to a mainstream genre, that ripples its influence throughout contemporary culture.

== Awards ==
In 2016 the series was awarded a Peabody Award. The series garnered four Canadian Screen Award nominations at the 5th Canadian Screen Awards in 2017, for Best Biography or Arts Documentary Program or Series, Best Editing in a Documentary Program or Series (Steve Taylor and Mark Staunton) Best Writing in a Documentary Program or Series (Rodrigo Bascunan) and Best Direction in a Documentary or Factual Series (Darby Wheeler). It won the awards for Best Biography or Arts Documentary and Best Editing. The series was also awarded with a 2017 International Emmy for Best Arts Programming.

== Episodes ==
Series	Episodes	Originally released		
Series	Episodes	First released	Last released	Network
1	4	4 September 2016	25 September 2016	HBO Canada
2	4	19 October 2018		Netflix
3	4	6 September 2019		Netflix
4	4	17 January 2020		Netflix

=== Season 1 (2016) ===
No. overall	No. in season	Title	Directed by	Original release date
1	1	"The Foundation"	Darby Wheeler	4 September 2016
In the 1970s, DJ Kool Herc, Afrika Bambaataa, Grandmaster Flash and the first rhythmic rappers lay the foundations of hip-hop in the South Bronx
2	2	"The Underground to the Mainstream"	Darby Wheeler	11 September 2016
Bootleg tapes capture the energy of live battles, the Sugarhill Gang releases a Top 40 hit, and hip-hop meets art punk in downtown New York
3	3	"The New Guard"	Darby Wheeler	18 September 2016
Run-DMC and Def Jam bridge the rap-rock divide. Innovators like Marley Marl and Rakim usher in a new sound, and Public Enemy raises consciousness
4	4	"The Birth of Gangsta Rap"	Darby Wheeler	25 September 2016
Ice-T and N.W.A put West Coast rap on the map, documenting the reality of life in South Central L.A. Dr. Dre tops the charts with "The Chronic"

=== Season 2 (2018) ===
No. overall	No. in season	Title	Directed by	Original release date
5	1	"The Southern Way"	Darby Wheeler	19 October 2018
2 Live Crew popularizes the Miami bass sound and scores a victory for free speech. The Geto Boys put Houston on the map, paving the way for UGK
6	2	"Out The Trunk: The Bay"	Darby Wheeler	19 October 2018
In the Bay Area, Too Short channels pimp culture, MC Hammer becomes rap's first pop star, and Digital Underground introduces the world to Tupac Shakur
7	3	"Do The Knowledge"	Darby Wheeler	19 October 2018
KRS-One makes his mark at New York's legendary Latin Quarter club. A Tribe Called Quest and De La Soul cultivate an Afrocentric, jazzy style
8	4	"New York State Of Mind"	Darby Wheeler	19 October 2018
In the early 1990s, a new wave of East Coast artists emerges, led by Nas, Wu-Tang Clan and the Notorious B.I.G.

=== Season 3 (2019) ===
No. overall	No. in season	Title	Directed by	Original release date
9	1	"A Tale of Two Coasts"	Darby Wheeler, Rodrigo Bascuñán	6 September 2019
With the rise of N.W.A., gangsta rap and Suge Knight, the East Coast-West Coast rivalry climaxes with a lethal beef ensnaring the great Tupac Shakur.
10	2	"Life After Death"	Darby Wheeler, Rodrigo Bascuñán	6 September 2019
In NYC, the Notorious B.I.G. fosters an empowering protégée, Lil' Kim. When the East-West feud claims Biggie, Puff Daddy and Jay-Z vie for the throne.
11	3	"Pass the Mic"	Darby Wheeler	6 September 2019
Alternative hip-hop bubbles up from the streets; Mos Def spits in NYC, the Freestyle Fellowship chops it up in LA, and Eminem battles on the circuit.
12	4	"The Dirty South"	Darby Wheeler	6 September 2019
A hot, sticky music scene is born in Atlanta as the infectious hooks of TLC and Kris Kross yield to the gritty originality of OutKast and Goodie Mob.

=== Season 4 (2020) ===
No. overall	No. in season	Title	Directed by	Original release date
13	1	"Bounce to This"	Darby Wheeler, Rodrigo Bascuñán	17 January 2020
Rooted in New Orleans's rich music culture, No Limit mogul Master P and bounce breakouts DJ Jimi and Juvenile shake rap and put twerking on the map.
14	2	"The Southern Lab"	Darby Wheeler, Rodrigo Bascuñán	17 January 2020
Innovators explode out of the South: Houston's DJ Screw slows hip-hop down, Memphis's Three 6 Mafia goes dark, and Atlanta's Lil Jon brings the crunk.
15	3	"The Super Producers"	Darby Wheeler	17 January 2020
Auteurs like the Neptunes' Pharrell and Chad expand the sonic palette. Timbaland and Missy Elliott lean forward. Kanye West and J Dilla reimagine rap.
16	4	"Street Dreams"	Darby Wheeler	17 January 2020
Mixtapes spread the hottest sounds, infringe copyright and break artists. Among them, 50 Cent polarizes, T.I. takes off with trap, and Lil Wayne clicks.
