= Russell Peters Vs. the World =

2013 American docu-series on Netflix

- Genre: Documentary
- Starring: Russell Peters; Matt Schichter
- Country of origin: United States
- Original language: English
- No. of seasons: 1
- No. of episodes: 4

Original release
- Network: Netflix
- Release: October 8, 2013

Russell Peters Vs. the World is a television documentary series, starring Russell Peters and Matt Schichter. It consists of four episodes following comedian Russell Peters' "Notorious" world tour behind the scenes.

== Premise ==
Russell Peters Vs. the World consists of four episodes following comedian Russell Peters' "Notorious" world tour behind the scenes. The series features Peters' stand up performance in Sydney from early 2013, and includes topics such as ethnic, racial, class and cultural stereotypes.

== Cast ==
- Russell Peters
- Matt Schichter

== Release ==
It was released on October 8, 2013 on Netflix streaming although it has since been removed.
