= A Little Help with Carol Burnett =

- Written by: Carol Leifer; Jim Wise
- Directed by: Sandra Restrepo Considine
- Presented by: Carol Burnett
- Starring: Russell Peters
- Theme music composer: Lonny Johnson
- Composers: Gregory Butler; Joey Newman
- Country of origin: United States
- Original language: English
- No. of seasons: 1
- No. of episodes: 12

Production
- Executive producers: Carol Burnett; Steve Sauer; Allen Shapiro; Mike Mahan; Mark Bracco; Izzie Pick Ibarra
- Production locations: Warner Bros. Studios, Burbank, California
- Production companies: Mabel Cat Productions; Dick Clark Productions

Original release
- Network: Netflix
- Release: May 4, 2018

A Little Help with Carol Burnett is an American television series hosted by Carol Burnett who leads a panel of children who offer unscripted advice to celebrities and average people about everyday issues in front of a live audience. The show premiered on May 4, 2018 on Netflix. The series has been confirmed to not be returning for season 2.

== Premise ==
A Little Help with Carol Burnett is a panel show hosted by Carol Burnett who is "joined by a group of straight-talking and entertaining 5 to 9-year-old kids", according to Deadline Hollywood. The children offer their opinions and advice to average adults about issues they face in everyday life, such as issues related to dating, marriage, parenting, self-care, etc. Each episode features a celebrity guest who receives feedback from the child panel after sharing about a personal dilemma.

== Cast ==
Host

- Carol Burnett

Co-Host

- Russell Peters

=== Panel ===
- Emmersyn Fiorentino
- Amari McCoy
- Tristan Sutton
- Charlie Kolsby
- Seane Mele
- Robert Smith
- Celine Sela Montanye
- Jimi Orekoya
- Caleb Jeon
- Rainey Spurlock
- Hayden Carroll
- AJ Heinicke
- Gavin Reyes
- Ava Clarke

== Episodes ==
No.	Title	Featured celebrity	Original release date
1	"Friendship"	Lisa Kudrow	May 4, 2018
2	"Love"	Candace Cameron Bure	May 4, 2018
3	"Marriage"	Tony Hale	May 4, 2018
4	"Parenting"	DJ Khaled	May 4, 2018
5	"Home"	Brittany Snow	May 4, 2018
6	"#Selfcare"	Derek Hough	May 4, 2018
7	"Dating"	Mark Cuban	May 4, 2018
8	"Communication"	Wanda Sykes	May 4, 2018
9	"Tech"	Finn Wolfhard	May 4, 2018
10	"Life"	Taraji P. Henson	May 4, 2018
11	"Big Issues"	Billy Eichner	May 4, 2018
12	"Family"	Julie Bowen	May 4, 2018

== Production ==
On July 31, 2017, it was announced that Netflix had given the production series order for a first season consisting of twelve episodes. Alongside the announcement, it was reported that the series would be produced by Dick Clark Productions.

On April 16, 2018, it was announced that the series would premiere on May 4, 2018. Additionally, it was confirmed that Russell Peters would act as co-host and that Julie Bowen, Candace Cameron Bure, Mark Cuban, Billy Eichner, Taraji P. Henson, Derek Hough, DJ Khaled, Lisa Kudrow, Brittany Snow, Wanda Sykes, and Finn Wolfhard would appear as guests.
