= Comedy at Club 54 =

Canadian television program

- Genre: Comedy
- Presented by: Ben Guyatt
- Country of origin: Canada
- Original language: English

Production
- Production locations: Club 54; Burlington, Ontario

Original release
- Release: 1 November 1990 – 2002

Comedy at Club 54 is a Canadian television program hosted by Ben Guyatt. The show was produced from the early 1990s until 2002 and is now airing in syndicated re-runs on the Canadian Comedy Network. Tapings took place in Burlington, Ontario at Club 54. The live performances still happen weekly, although new episodes of the Comedy at Club 54 TV show have not been aired since 2002.

The taped shows usually begin with a zoom-in to host Ben Guyatt, who then reads the "Joke of the Week", which was a weekly joke ostensibly sent in from program viewers across North America. Typically, he then throws the joke card behind him and says to the audience "Welcome to Comedy at Club 54!" This was followed by the opening sequence, audience applause, and the show's theme song, played by an in-house band.

Guyatt then introduces the comedians, who over the years have come from all over North America. The performances were almost all of the typical stand-up comedy variety, but also included magicians, ventriloquists, vaudeville acts, comedy duos and musical acts. Every show features at least two comedians with a 12-minute televised spot (less time if there are more guests), although the live performances are much longer and were edited for time.

Acts who appeared on the show include Todd Barry, Pat McKenna and Russell Peters.

The show usually closes with Guyatt once again on stage, calling up the comedians for a final bow. At this point Guyatt would usually say "And remember, we share the planet with the animals, so please, I beg ya, treat 'em with respect", followed by "Goodnight Mom, I love ya!"
