= Scott Capurro =

American comedian (born 1962)

- Born: Scott Allen Capurro; December 10, 1962 (age 63); San Francisco, California, U.S.

Comedy career
- Genre: Comedy
- Website: www.ScottCapurro.com

Scott Allen Capurro (born December 10, 1962) is an American comedian, writer and actor based in San Francisco. His comedy material is deliberately provocative, referring often to gay life and culture, politics, race and racism, and popular culture.

== Career ==
In 1994, Capurro was awarded the Perrier Award for best newcomer at the Edinburgh Festival.

In 1999, Capurro played the voice of Beed Annodue along with actor, comedian, and friend Greg Proops in Star Wars: Episode I – The Phantom Menace.

In 2001, Capurro appeared on Australian show Rove Live and shocked the host, Rove McManus, with an explicit routine. McManus apologized immediately after the performance.

In 2002, Capurro presented a light-hearted documentary on the UK's Channel 4 called The Truth About Gay Animals which examined the subject of homosexuality in animals. Capurro visited various collections of captive animals to observe animals which had been reported to exhibit homosexual behaviour, and interviewed the staff about this. The show also included an interview with anti-gay rights campaigner and politician, Janet Young, where Capurro showed Young a video of a variety of male-male intercourse and female-female mating attempts in various animal species, and then asked her to comment on whether this influenced her views about its "unnaturalness".

Capurro has been a frequent guest on the Sarah & Vinnie's Morning Show of Radio Alice 97.3FM KLLC San Francisco. He was also a regular panelist on the topical discussion series The Wright Stuff, hosted by his friend Matthew Wright.

Capurro is managed by comedy agency The Comedy Bar.

From May to June 2008, Capurro acted the role of Sammy in Joe DiPietro's play Fucking Men in London, England.

On the reaction to his work, Capurro said:

"I don't give a shit about those who don't like my work. I'm never going to win them over anyway, so why bother? My work is for a discerning audience who don't have knee-jerk responses."

— Interview with Veronica Lee, The Evening Standard, November 6, 2000

=== Film ===
| Year | Film | Role |
|---|---|---|
| 1993 | Mrs. Doubtfire | Jack |
| 1999 | Star Wars: Episode I – The Phantom Menace | Beed Annodue (voice) |

=== Television ===
| Year | Programme | Role | Production |
|---|---|---|---|
| 1998 | We're Funny That Way! | Self | |
| 1998–1999 | Nash Bridges | Larry, pageant coordinator (2 episodes, High Society and Cuda Grace) | Carlton Cuse Productions |
| 2001–2002 | That Gay Show | Presenter | BBC |
| 2002 | The Truth About Gay Animals | Presenter | Channel 4 |

=== Stage ===
| Year | Play | Role | Production |
|---|---|---|---|
| 1990 | The Boys in the Band | Emory | Theater Rhinoceros |
| 1995–1996 | Risk-Gay | (one-man show) | Melbourne, London, San Francisco |
| 1996 | Love and Affection | (one-man show) | |
| 2001 | Fucking Our Fathers | (one-man show) | Edinburgh Festival |
| 2004 | Loaded | Scott Capurro | Pleasance Courtyard |
| 2007 | Summer Fruit | (one-man show) | Throckmorton Theatre (California) |
| 2008 | Fucking Men | Sammy (screenwriter) | Finborough, London |

== Personal life ==
Capurro and his husband live in San Francisco. He tours consistently, spending most of his time abroad in England.
