= Outsourced (album) =

Live album by Russell Peters
- Released: August 29, 2006
- Recorded: January 14, 2006
- Genre: Comedy
- Length: 70:28
- Label: Warner Bros. Records; 44260
- Producer: Russell Peters (exec.), Clayton Peters (exec.), J.P. Williams, Alan C. Blomquist

Russell Peters chronology
| Outsourced (2006) | Red, White and Brown (2008) |

Professional ratings
Review scores
| Source | Rating |
|---|---|
| AllMusic | 4/5 stars |

Outsourced is the debut stand-up comedy album of Canadian comedian Russell Peters. It was recorded at the Warfield Theatre in San Francisco on January 14, 2006. It aired on Comedy Central on August 26, 2006, and it became available on CD/DVD, on August 29, 2006. In Canada, Outsourced was certified 11 times platinum (110,000 copies).

== Description ==
Peters' comic routines on the DVD are about Asians, Hispanics, English accents, terrorists, and his parents, among other things.

== Track listing ==
1. "Filthy Downloaders" – 2:48
2. "Two Types of Asians" – 4:10
3. "Speaking English" – 4:50
4. "Traveling in Vietnam" – 2:27
5. "Catherine & Vincent" – 6:22
6. "Beijing KFC" – 3:05
7. "Lost Luggage" – 3:03
8. "Passport Photo" – 2:13
9. "Terrorists vs. Indians" – 3:07
10. "Latinos in the House" – 4:19
11. "Cultural Names" – 7:11
12. "Convincing Indians" – 2:19
13. "Embarrassing Parents" – 1:42
14. "English Accents" – 3:55
15. "White People" – 4:01
16. "The Great Discoverer" – 1:01
17. "American Culture" – 2:15
18. "Chicken Dance/YMCA" – 4:08
19. "Somebody Gonna Get a Hurt..." – 7:32

== Certifications ==
| Country | Certification | Sales |
|---|---|---|
| Canada | 11× Platinum | 110,000 |
