= Rodrigo Bascuñán =

Chilean-Canadian author, television writer and producer

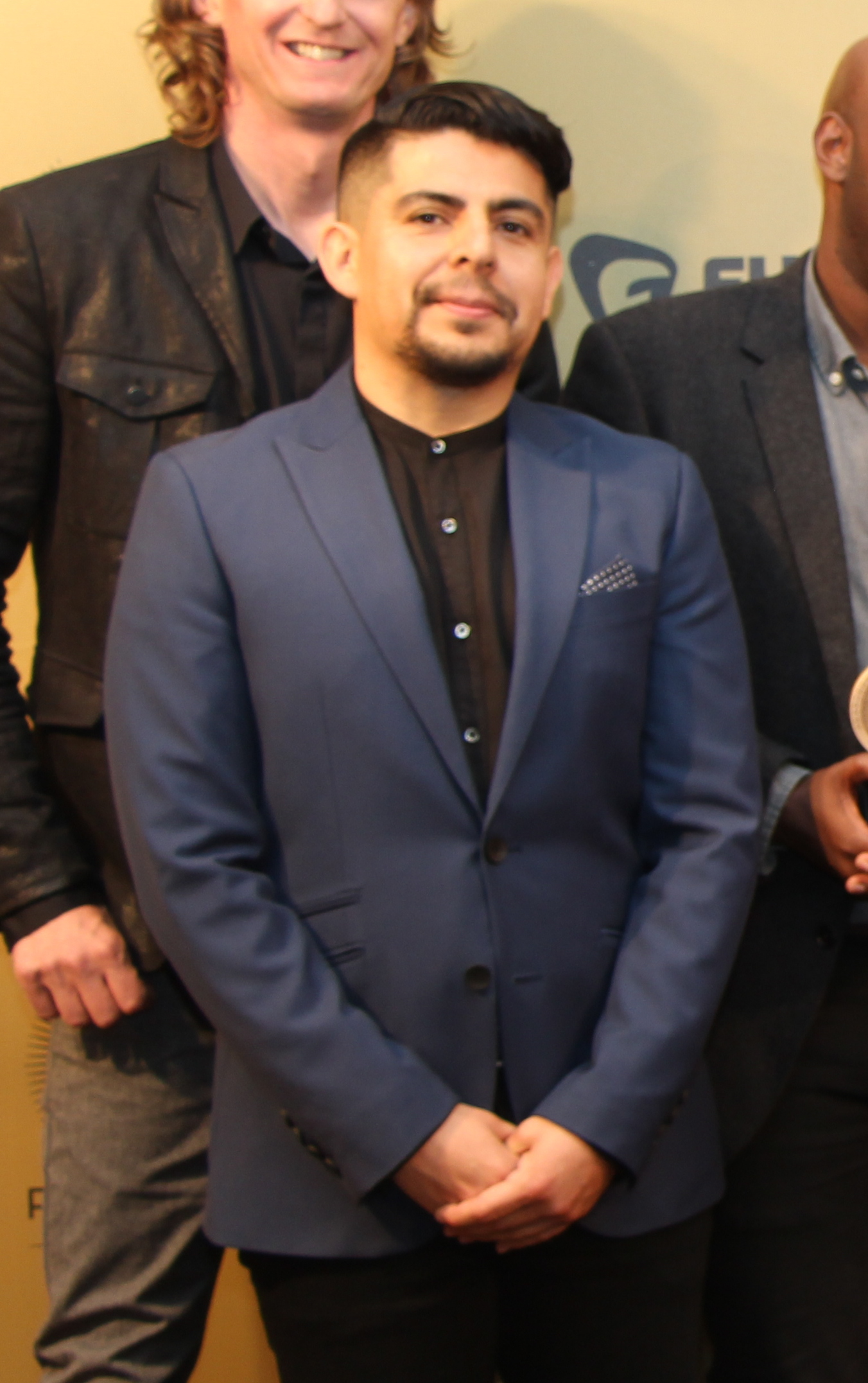
Rodrigo Bascuñán, 2017

Rodrigo Salago Bascuñán (born March 10, 1976) is a Chilean-Canadian author, television writer and producer. His non-fiction book, Enter The Babylon System: Unpacking Gun Culture from Samuel Colt to 50 Cent, was nominated for numerous literary awards. He is more recently recognized for writing and producing the Peabody and International Emmy Award winning documentary series Hip-Hop Evolution.

== Biography ==
Born in Santiago, Chile, Bascuñán's family immigrated to Toronto, Ontario, Canada, in 1977 to escape the Pinochet dictatorship.

In 1998, Bascuñán began work on Pound Magazine, the magazine would debut a year and half later when the first issue was published in December 1999. Bascuñán created the "Babylon System" column in the magazine in 2000. Originally a collection of statistics highlighting injustice in the world, Pound co-founder Christian Pearce refined "Babylon System" into a section of original investigative reporting.

In 2004, Bascuñán and Pearce signed a publishing deal with Random House Canada to publish a book on the topic of gun violence. The resulting book, Enter The Babylon System: Unpacking Gun Culture from Samuel Colt To 50 Cent, was released in January 2007 to critical acclaim. The book garnered nominations for the 2007 Governor General's Awards, Donner Prize, The National Business Book Award, and an Arthur Ellis Award.
