= 8 Out of 10 Cats =

British television comedy panel game

- Genre: Comedy panel game
- Presented by: Jimmy Carr
- Starring: Sean Lock; Dave Spikey; Jason Manford; Jon Richardson; Rob Beckett; Aisling Bea; Katherine Ryan
- Narrated by: John Pohlhammer
- Theme music composer: Mat Osman
- Country of origin: United Kingdom
- Original language: English
- No. of series: 22
- No. of episodes: 232 (list of episodes)

Production
- Production locations: BBC Television Centre (series 1–15); Teddington Studios (series 16); Pinewood Studios (series 16–17, 19, 22); Shepperton Studios (series 18); Elstree Studios (series 20); BBC Elstree Centre (series 21)
- Camera setup: Multi-camera
- Running time: 23–28 minutes
- Production company: Zeppotron

Original release
- Network: Channel 4
- Release: 3 June 2005 – 29 December 2015
- Network: More4
- Release: 8 November 2016 – 1 February 2017
- Network: E4
- Release: 16 May 2017 – 17 January 2021

Related
- 8 Out of 10 Cats: Uncut; 8 Out of 10 Cats Does Countdown

8 Out of 10 Cats (stylised as 8 out of 10 CATS) is a British comedy panel show that aired from 3 June 2005 to 17 January 2021. It was first broadcast on Channel 4 from 2005 to 2015, then More4 from 2016 to 2017, and finally E4 from 2017 to 2021. The show was hosted by Jimmy Carr and featured regular team captains Sean Lock, Dave Spikey, Jason Manford, Jon Richardson, Rob Beckett, Aisling Bea and Katherine Ryan.

The show was based on statistics and opinion polls and draws on polls produced by a variety of organisations and new polls commissioned for the programme, carried out by The Harris Poll.

The title was derived from an old popular misquoting of a well-known advertising tagline for Whiskas cat food, which claimed that "8 out of 10 owners (later advertisements adding "who expressed a preference") said their cats prefer it". (The misquoting may be due to the fact that Whiskas actually trademarked the phrase "8 out of 10 cats prefer Whiskas", even though it was never used that way in the advertisements.)

Past episodes air across the Channel 4 network of channels, including More4 and E4 Extra, and past episodes are also repeated on U&Dave and Comedy Central. As of present, there has been no announcement from Channel 4 about commissioning a new series of the show. The spinoff 8 Out of 10 Cats Does Countdown remains in production as of 2026.

== Overview ==
The show was hosted by comedian Jimmy Carr and featured two teams consisting of a regular team captain and two celebrity guests each. Sean Lock appeared as a team captain from series 1 to 18. He was replaced by Rob Beckett at the beginning of series 19. The opposing captain was originally Dave Spikey, who left after series 4 and was replaced by Jason Manford. Manford departed following series 10 and was replaced by Jon Richardson for series 11 to 18. From series 19 to 20, the opposing captain was Aisling Bea. In series 21, the opposing team had a rotating guest captain. However, Katherine Ryan joined as the opposing team captain in series 22.

The original format was filmed the day before broadcast with a live studio audience at BBC Television Centre. The captains were joined by two celebrities and occasionally a guest captain would substitute. Often, topical celebrities appeared on the show, such as Ruth Badger following her appearance on The Apprentice.

The format was changed for the move from Channel 4 onto More4 and E4. Shows were then recorded consecutively, and no longer covered topical issues. The two team captains were replaced, but Carr still hosted.

A full series was not broadcast in 2015, although two Christmas Specials were filmed and aired on 24 and 30 December 2015. No episodes were broadcast during 2018. The 22nd and final series started on 7 January 2020 and ended on 17 January 2021.

== Rounds ==
Latterly, the rounds featured on 8 Out of 10 Cats were:

- "What Are You Talking About?" – The polling organisation asked the public what they were talking about during the week. The teams had to try to guess the top three.
- "Pick of the Polls" – The teams were given four pictures to pick from and were given a poll based on that picture.
- "Believe It or Not" – The teams were given a statistic and tried to guess whether it was true or false.
- "And the Winner Is..." – The teams were given a question from a poll and then tried to guess what came on top of that poll.
- "The Poll with a Hole" – each team was given a statistic, but it was missing one piece of salient information. The teams had to guess what that piece of information was.

Until series 8, there were four rounds during the game. It was later reduced to three. The points often don't add up correctly, as the show had to be edited to fit its 26-minute slot. From series 9, there is a longer version of the show called 8 Out of 10 Cats Uncut, broadcast a few days later.

These rounds only featured in series 1 and the Big Brother special shows:

- "Face Off" – The teams had to guess who from a list of famous people came top with respect to a particular topic.
- "Word Association" – The teams viewed clip illustrating a word and had to guess the top three things which people thought of when they heard that word.
- "What's the Poll?" – The teams were given five famous people, picture by picture, and they had to guess which poll they appeared on.

== 8 Out of 10 Cats Does Countdown ==
Since 2012, crossover episodes between 8 Out of 10 Cats and Countdown have aired. The show follows the format of Countdown, but is hosted by Jimmy Carr. As of January 2026 there have been 180 episodes that have aired. Jon Richardson is the only permanent contestant following Sean Lock's death in 2021.

== Other specials ==
On 4 January 2013, a special episode of Deal or No Deal featuring Carr as host along with Richardson and Lock aired during another Channel 4 "mash-up night". The story behind it was that Noel Edmonds had been driven to leave when Derren Brown was playing and was getting all the boxes from lowest to highest, ensuring that the "dream finish" is in play. Edmonds ran away with Brown's £250,000 box, saying that he "spent it all on [his] shirt". The backstage personnel took out a hammer and smashed the Break glass for Jimmy Carr box, which produced a horn, which was used to call Carr to the set.

Joe Wilkinson guest starred as the Banker's assistant. The guests were Nicola Adams, Rob Beckett, Gemma Collins, Mia Cross, Corinne Davies, Susie Dent, Matt Forde, John Fothergill, Stephen Frost, Nick Helm, Elis James, Dave Johns, Tony Law, Alice Levine, Mark Olver, Rachel Riley, John Robins, Katherine Ryan, Nong Skett, Andy Smart and Holly Walsh.

== Podcasts ==
A series of podcasts have also been released on iTunes, with material directly from the show, for several episodes. Each podcast is typically the "What Are You Talking About" round from that episode.

== Cast ==
Role	Series																					
Role	1	2	3	4	5	6	7	8	9	10	11	12	13	14	15	16	17	18	19	20	21	22
Presenter	Jimmy Carr	Jimmy Carr	Jimmy Carr	Jimmy Carr	Jimmy Carr	Jimmy Carr	Jimmy Carr	Jimmy Carr	Jimmy Carr	Jimmy Carr	Jimmy Carr	Jimmy Carr	Jimmy Carr	Jimmy Carr	Jimmy Carr	Jimmy Carr	Jimmy Carr	Jimmy Carr	Jimmy Carr	Jimmy Carr	Jimmy Carr	Jimmy Carr
Team captains	Sean Lock	Sean Lock	Sean Lock	Sean Lock	Sean Lock	Sean Lock	Sean Lock	Sean Lock	Sean Lock	Sean Lock	Sean Lock	Sean Lock	Sean Lock	Sean Lock	Sean Lock	Sean Lock	Sean Lock	Sean Lock	Rob Beckett	Rob Beckett	Rob Beckett	Rob Beckett
Team captains	Dave Spikey	Dave Spikey	Dave Spikey	Dave Spikey	Jason Manford	Jason Manford	Jason Manford	Jason Manford	Jason Manford	Jason Manford	Jon Richardson	Jon Richardson	Jon Richardson	Jon Richardson	Jon Richardson	Jon Richardson	Jon Richardson	Jon Richardson	Aisling Bea	Aisling Bea	Guests	Katherine Ryan

== Episodes ==
Series	Episodes	Originally released		
Series	Episodes	First released	Last released	Network
1	11	3 June 2005	12 August 2005	Channel 4
2	7	10 February 2006	24 March 2006	Channel 4
3	9	26 May 2006	18 August 2006	Channel 4
4	9	20 October 2006	15 December 2006	Channel 4
5	7	15 June 2007	30 August 2007	Channel 4
6	6	13 June 2008	18 July 2008	Channel 4
7	15	4 September 2008	26 December 2008	Channel 4
8	8	5 June 2009	24 July 2009	Channel 4
9	8	8 January 2010	21 August 2010	Channel 4
10	8	11 June 2010	23 December 2010	Channel 4
Special		5 March 2011		Channel 4
11	11	17 June 2011	26 August 2011	Channel 4
12	12	23 September 2011	23 December 2011	Channel 4
Special		23 March 2012		Channel 4
13	11	27 April 2012	6 July 2012	Channel 4
14	12	8 October 2012	24 December 2012	Channel 4
15	12	18 January 2013	9 September 2013	Channel 4
16	11	4 October 2013	29 December 2013	Channel 4
17	11	17 February 2014	20 August 2014	Channel 4
18	12	6 October 2014	23 December 2014	Channel 4
Specials	2	24 December 2015	29 December 2015	Channel 4
19	12	8 November 2016	1 February 2017	More4
20	12	16 May 2017	1 August 2017	E4
21	12	24 March 2019	6 January 2020	E4
22	12	7 January 2020	17 January 2021	E4

== DVD ==
8 Out of 10 Cats: Claws Out is a ninety-minute collection of highlights from the first few series featuring deleted scenes considered too offensive to be aired. It was released by Channel 4 DVD and Endemol on 20 November 2006.
