= Bassem Feghali =

Lebanese actor

Bassem Feghali باسم فغالي
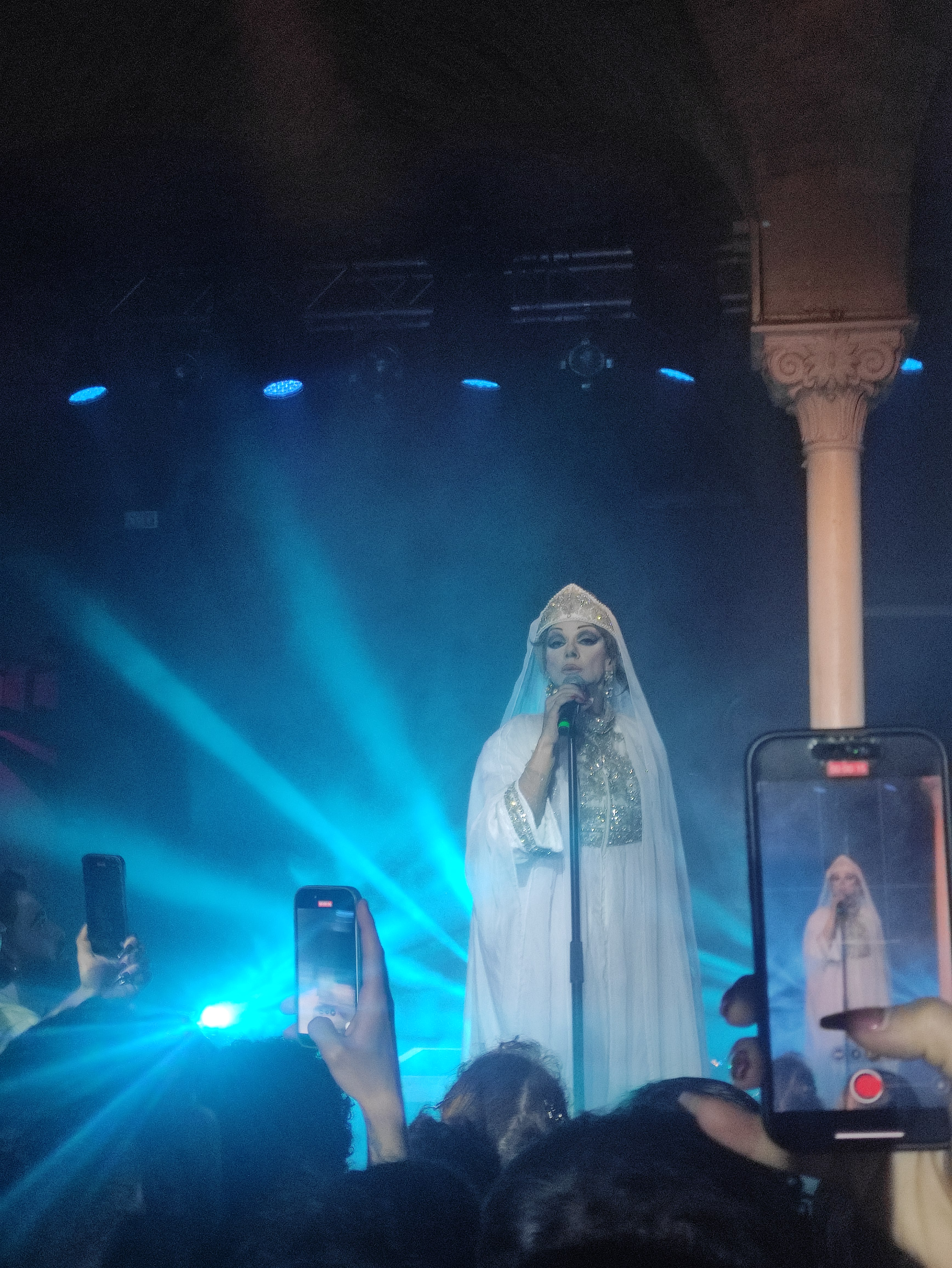
- Bassem Feghali at a performance in Berlin in 2025

Background information
- Born: September 21, 1977 (age 49); Beirut, Lebanon
- Years active: 1996–present

Bassem Feghali (Arabic: باسم فغالي) is a Lebanese actor known for his drag performances and humorous impersonations of Arab and international celebrities, particularly female singers, and is considered one of the most prominent drag personalities in the Arab world.

== Life ==
Feghali was born in Wadi Shahrour, a small town near Beirut. He is a distant relative of the Lebanese singer Sabah.

He began his career in 1996 by winning a gold medal on the Lebanese talent show Studio El Fan, which has served as a launching pad for many Arab musicians and actors since the 1970s, including Elissa, Wael Kfoury, and Ragheb Alameh. On the show, Feghali impersonated both male and female public figures. With an imitation of Sabah, he won the gold medal and subsequently signed a ten-year contract with the Lebanese television channel LBC.

After his breakthrough on Studio El-Fan, Feghali became a regular presence on Lebanese television, especially on LBC, where he appeared in numerous primetime shows. During Ramadan in 2006, he hosted the daily Fawazeer Ramadan TV show Alf Wayle Bi Layle, in which he impersonated a different Arab female artist each day. This show made him famous throughout the Arab world. Some people he imitated were Sabah, Nawal Al Zoghbi, Fifi Abdo, Assala and Majida El Roumi.

Feghali is known for his privacy regarding his personal life. He avoids public appearances outside his shows and rarely gives interviews. Despite his popularity in the Arab world, his personal life remains largely private.

== Style ==
Feghali’s performances are known for elaborate costumes, wigs, and makeup. He combines singing, comedy, and dance to humorously portray well-known figures. He writes his own sketches, designs his stage sets and costumes, records his own music, and prepares for his roles through intensive rehearsals, diets, and workouts. He is known for preparing meticulously for each character.

Feghali began his career by impersonating Sabah and later expanded his repertoire to include numerous Lebanese and international artists such as Nawal Al Zoughbi, Haifa Wehbe, Fairouz, Shakira, Marilyn Monroe, Lady Gaga, Britney Spears, Marwa, Nancy Ajram, Elissa, Mariam Nour, Shakira, and Britney Spears. He is especially recognized for mimicking the voices of the artists he parodies without lip-syncing. He has also impersonated historical figures such as Ivette Sursok, Maggi Farah and Miss Lebanon pageant contestants, such as Lamita Franjieh.

In addition to impersonating famous figures, Feghali also created original, satirical characters. One of his most famous creations is Antika Sursock, a caricature of the Christian Lebanese aristocracy. Antika mainly speaks French, acts cosmopolitan, and evokes a bygone era of glamour. Another character is Hala Tamarzof, a superficial and chatty young woman from Keserwan, obsessed with gossip magazines and horoscopes.

== Significance ==
His work has contributed to increased visibility of drag art in the Middle East and has sparked discussions about gender roles and social norms. Many of his catchphrases have entered everyday Arabic slang. Fashion designer Shukri Lawrence as well as drag queens Anya Kneez and Evita Kedavra cite Feghali as one of their main inspirations. The Lebanese author Rana Issa featured Masoud El Amaratly in a piece they wrote for inclusion in The Queer Arab Glossary; in it El Amaratly joined Feghali for a gossip.

In 2000, Feghali was awarded the Murex d'Or for Best Monologist of the Year.
