= Nour Men Nour =

Nour Men Nour (A Light From Light)

Studio album by Majida El Roumi
- Released: December 6, 2013
- Recorded: Summer of 2013
- Genre: Classical music
- Length: 32:44
- Label: V. Productions
- Producer: Awad El Roumi

Majida El Roumi chronology
| Ghazal (2012) | Nour Men Nour (A Light From Light) (2013) |

Singles from Nour Men Nour
- 1. "Sahrit Eid" Released: December 5, 2013; 2. "Min Lli Tall" Released: December 5, 2013

Nour Men Nour (Arabic: نور من نور / A Light From Light) is the fourteenth full-length studio album by Lebanese soprano Majida El Roumi released on December 6, 2013, by V.Productions. The album explores 12 Christmas carols exploring a wide set of musical genres including classical music and opera preserving the same musical track that Majida had sung over the years.

The album peaked the top of the music charts in Virgin Megastores in Lebanon from the day of its release for several consecutive weeks. Critics also gave largely positive reviews, favoring its shift between modern and global sounds, and its ability to join these sounds with local music and Arabian themes. Lyrically, the record speaks of love, forgiveness, family and the relationship between God and men.

== Development and release ==
Majida had been always known for her gratitude of praising the Lord as well as hosting many live recitals for charity or on television since the beginning of the 90s. In the summer of 2013, she got the chance to gather some of her most famous songs and carols previously performed in a unique studio album also with new ones written specially for this record.

I wanted this album to be a bridge crossing to every needy or helpless out there, meaning a work adapted to all charities for them to benefit for its funds and sales income.

— Majida El Roumi

Nour Men Nour was released on December 6, 2013, and promoted on Lebanese radio stations by two singles, "Sahrit Eid" and "Min lli Tall", as well as a teaser on Majida's official Facebook page. it was promoted majorly online, via the official Facebook page and YouTube channel. Majida also filmed a Christmas special episode aired on Christmas Eve on MTV Lebanon which included a live recital from Collège du Sacré-Cœur catholic cathedral in Gemayzeh, Downtown Beirut, and scenes from a visit she had to "Mission De Vie" charity center. Bassem Christo directed the whole episode in HD for the first time on MTV channel and got a French lighting crew supervised by Jean-Philippe Bordon specially for this occasion. As Majida stated, Christmas is an occasion to celebrate as a one big Arabic family, while she added that all sales income and profits went to charity to encourage the spirit of sharing in the Arab World during the unstable periods.

== Composition and musical styles ==
Lebanese violinist and music arranger Claude Chalhoub arranged all 12 tracks. He is also the music producer for this record and worked with the Berlin Symphony Orchestra (BSO). All the music was recorded and mixed in Berlin, Germany at FWL, N-HOW Studios by sound engineer Kai Mäeder, while Majida put her voice in JMR Studios in Lebanon where the album was also mastered by sound engineer Xavier Escabasse. The album booklet is designed by Michelle Daou and all photographs are taken by professional photographer Fares Jammal in the neighborhoods of Batroun in northern Lebanon. Starting with its wide arrangement, Nour Men Nour holds some of the most famous international tunes and jingles with new adapted styles, like the Waltz for "Sahrit Eid" with Arabic lyrics from Henry Zoughaib, originally "We Three Kings" composed by John Henry Hopkins, and "De'e Bwabon" originally adapted from "Hark! The Herald Angels Sing" by Felix Mendelssohn. Freely inspired from the ancient days of Bethlehem, Habib Younes wrote the lyrics of track 7, "Bethlehem" with music originally from "O Little Town of Bethlehem" by Lewis Redner. Younes also wrote most of the Arabic versions of the album carols such as track 8 adapted from the traditional music of "Deck the Halls" and Tango styled track "Rass El Seni", a short jingle composed by Khaled Mouzanar with folk music inspired arrangement. Henry Zoughaib wrote "Min Lli Tall", too. Its large string sections and harp noted a remarkable adaptation of Adolphe Adam's "O Holy Night" transposed to a classical mood carol by Majida's operatic abilities.

Music composer and vocal coach Lena Khater composed "Fiyyi Raja" by poet Germanos Germanos and "Ya Raytak Bi Hal Milad" written by Nizar Francis. The special flavor that had "Fiyyi Raja" in the album was the choir accompaniment for Majida during the full recording reminding of the Byzantine music through the merge of more than one Arabic maqam without any orchestra included, while "Ya Raytak Bi Hal Milad" came expressing a different style with percussion interference and smooth a cappella moments. Track 11, "Yenaad Alaykon" gives the album its oriental character with music from Majida's late father Halim El Roumi. The song exposes warm wishes for the holidays' season with a joyful arrangement suitable for the lyrics by Habib Younes.

"Woulida El Massih, Hallelujah" is a short Christmas jingle by Joseph Khalifeh, who also composed "Nour El Alam", a classical wide-ranged song with high pitches and large orchestration. Majida had always performed this song with the French poetry of "Ô Verbe Dieu" but then switched to the Arabic lyrics specially for this record. Khalifeh also composed "Nachid El Hobb" previously released by Majida as a single in 2001 following her UN ambassador appointment. It is originally taken from the prologue of Dam'a wa Ibtisama (A Tear and A Smile) by Lebanese artist, poet and writer Gibran Khalil Gibran. Claude Chalhoub re-adapted the old version into a new one with a new dramatic orchestration exposing more the operatic pitches in the middle part as the song extends to more than two octaves.

== Track listing ==
International Edition

The track list was announced via iTunes on December 9, 2013.

| No. | Title | Lyrics | Music | Arrangement | Length |
|---|---|---|---|---|---|
| 1. | "Woulida El Massih Hallelujah" (Christ Is Born, Alleluia) | (Jingle) | Joseph Khalifeh | Claude Chalhoub | 2:36 |
| 2. | "De'e Bwabon" (Knock Their Doors) | Habib Younes | Felix Mendelssohn | Claude Chalhoub | 2:16 |
| 3. | "Sahrit Eid" (Holiday Evening) | Henry Zoughaib | John Henry Hopkins | Claude CHalhoub | 2:35 |
| 4. | "Min Lli Tall" (Who peered?) | Henry Zoughaib | Adolphe Adam | Claude Chalhoub | 3:01 |
| 5. | "Rass El Seni" (New Year) | Habib Younes | Khaled Mouzannar | Claude Chalhoub | 1:45 |
| 6. | "Ya Raytak Bi Hal Milad" (I Wish For This Christmas) | Nizar Francis | Lena Khater | Claude Chalhoub | 2:55 |
| 7. | "Bethlehem" (Bethlehem) | Habib Younes | Lewis Render | Claude Chalhoub | 2:24 |
| 8. | "Shu Helou Layl L Madini" (How Beautiful Is The City Night) | Habib Younes | Traditional Music | Claude Chalhoub | 1:13 |
| 9. | "Nour EL Alam" (Light Of The World) | Habib Younes | Joseph KHalifeh | Claude Chalhoub | 2:57 |
| 10. | "Fiyyi Raja" (I Have Hope) | Germanos Germanos | Lena Khater | Claude Chalhoub | 3:09 |
| 11. | "Yenaad Alaykoun" (Happy Holidays) | Habib Younes | Halim El Roumi | Claude Chalhoub | 4:18 |
| 12. | "Nachid El Hobb" (The Anthem of Love) | Gibran Khalil Gibran | Joseph KHalifeh | Claude Chalhoub | 3:51 |
