= Habeit Ya Leil =

Studio album by Nawal Al Zoghbi
- Released: March 14, 1997
- Recorded: 1996–1997
- Genre: Arabic pop
- Label: Relax-In International

Nawal Al Zoghbi chronology
Balaee Fi Zamany (1995)	Habeit Ya Leil (1997)	Mandam aleik (1998)

Singles from Habeit Ya Leil
- 1. "Habeit Ya Leil" Released: June 9, 1997; 2. "Ghareeb El Raai" Released: August 15, 1997; 3. "Noss El Alb" Released: November 11, 1997; 4. "Ana Hlaweit" Released: January 10, 1998

Habeit Ya Leil (Arabic: حبيت يا ليل) is the fourth album of Nawal Al Zoghbi. It included three hit singles. It was a follow-up to the duo she performed live and recorded in 1996 with Lebanese Artist Wael Kfouri, Meen Habibi Ana.

Surprisingly, after releasing two albums with Music Box International, Nawal chose Relax-In, the production label which produced her debut album Wehyati Andak, for this album. Afterwards, Nawal terminated the contract within the release of her next album.

== Track listing ==
1. "Habeit Ya Leil"
2. "Ana Hlaweit"
3. "Beini W Beinak"
4. "Sodfah"
5. "Noss El Alb"
6. "Tamini Habibi"
7. "La Tfaker"
8. "Ghareeb Al Raai"

== Music videos ==
- Habeit Ya Leil

Habeit Ya Leil had almost 5 Nawal duplicates, each singing several bits of the song. In some scenes they appear together, but in others they're by themselves.
