= Riad Sharara =

Lebanese television presenter

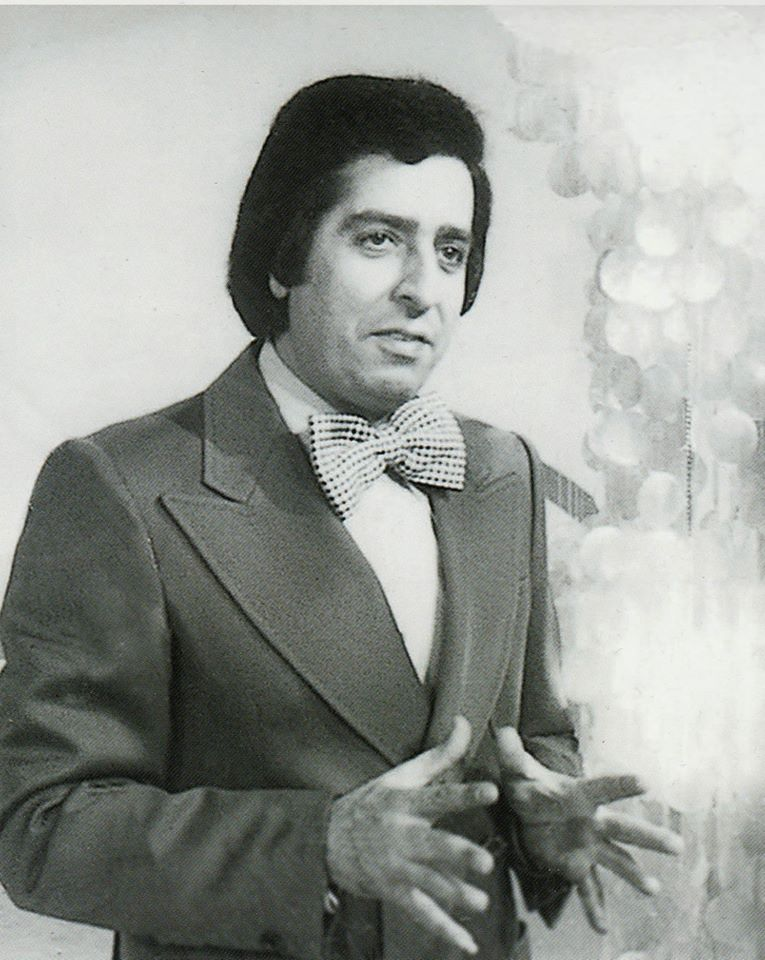
- Born: 1940
- Died: September 24, 1994 (aged 53–54)
- Television: Télé Liban, LBC
- Children: 3, including Hadi

Riad Sharara (also known as Reyad Sharara, Arabic: رياض شرارة) (1940 – September 24, 1994) was a Lebanese television presenter and sports commentator, journalist actor and author, known for his charisma and sense of humour. He is the father of the Lebanese music composer Hadi Sharara the husband of Carole Sakr.

== Biography ==
Born in 1940 in Machghara, he was a professor of literature and philosophy in the secondary schools between Ras al-Nabaa, Aley and Qab Elias.

One day, a friend advised him to try his luck by applying to a Lebanese radio station, which was looking for new talents for their shows. In 1962, Riad Sharara prepared his first radio competition programs, Zero or Twenty (صفر أو عشرين) and Think and Win (فكر واربح) which lasted 12 years. Then he worked as a reporter for BBC Radio until he agreed to Jean Khoury’s offer and turned to political news on “Lebanon TV”.

While reading news about the election of a president of a Western country, he stumbled over his name, so he said on air, "As we congratulate him on his position, we do not congratulate him at all on his name." This incident was enough for the management to know that Riad's place is on talk shows and variety, the most famous of which is the dubbed Japanese competition program Al-Hisn (Takeshi's Castle) that was broadcast in the 80's and 90's on Arab channels. He became popular on Television in the 90's after presenting a number of television game shows which were directed by Lebanese television director Simon Asmar. He presented many games shows for many years with Mireille Mazraani. The duo kept Lebanese viewers entertained for hours on Friday nights.

He had several acting experiences, including the series (Natour Al-Hara) in 1975.

Riad Sharara's activity was not limited to radio and television, as he took over the editor-in-chief of "Telecinema (تليسنما)", the publication of which stopped during the Lebanese civil war. He also worked in the Al-Akhbar newspaper. He released poetic albums in which he mixed melody and word with his own voice, including Al-Sayida Habibati, Aasheq Bel Wilada, Aashiq Hata Al Shahada and Ala Dafater Aynayha.

Riad Sharara died in 1994 at the age of 54 from a heart attack. Doctors misdiagnosed previous cardiac issues as less serious health issues, and he died during a performance on the LBCI channel.

== Personal life ==
Riad is the father of music composer Hadi Sharara, Ghadi Sharara, and daughter Nadine Sharara, who is known for her voice dubbing for Mexican television.

== See also ==
- Simon Asmar
- Mireille Mazraani
