= Mireille Mazraani =

Lebanese television presenter

Mireille Mazraani is a Lebanese television and radio shows presenter and media person, she got known for her loud laugh.

== Biography ==
She was born in Beirut, where she studied journalism and media. She was married to deceased Fawzi Al-Hasri and has two daughters Nidal and Maghda.

=== Radio ===
Her start was at Voice of Lebanon Radio (VDL), where she was working next to her home in Ashrafieh. Then she moved to Radio Lebanon Free (إذاعة لبنان الحر). At that time, the beginnings were very difficult, and she underwent training for two years before she was launched on the air. She was on the air and he used to tell her your voice was inappropriate, and he was asking her to work in the archives, it was a period of war, and she would stay for several days on the radio without being able to see my family, and sometimes I left the radio at midnight and the bombs were pouring into the sea in front of her, and there was no one on the road .

=== Television ===
She entered the field of television media in 1986 in LBC program Rally created by Alain Merheb and Antoine Kassabian , her first program with Simon Asmar and later in 1990 to present her second game and competition show Bab El Haz (باب الحظ) with Riad Sharara on the LBC with the director Simon Asmar, who had believed in her talents. After the death of Riad Sharara, she continued to present games programs on her own, then she moved MTV until the year 2000 when the closure of the station because of the decision of the Lebanese government. She presented a program entitled Ya Lail Ya Ain on the screen of MBC. In 2006, she also presented two programs on Future TV. She went away for several years and returned in 2010 to the same station to present the "Adham Shi" program.

She left MTV, heading to OTV to present a similar program.

In 2008 she presented a morning radio program on Radio Al Sharq for eight years.

In 2015, she presented a talent program entitled Sawtak Chaghleh (صوتك شغلة), on the New Channel at the request of director Simon Asmar.

In 2016, she presented Ahla Sobhieh "أحلى صبحية" on Fame FM radio.

== See also ==
- Riad Sharara
- Simon Asmar
- Lebanese Broadcasting Corporation
- MTV (Lebanon)
- Lebanese TV Stations
