= Darine Chahine =

- دارين شاهين
- Born: 7 October 1981 (age 45); Jezzine, Lebanon
- Occupations: Journalist, television host, television personality
- Years active: 2005–present
- Employer: Al Jadeed
- Television: Khedni bhelmak, Kabsit Zir, Ekher Moda

Darine Chahine (Arabic: دارين شاهين; born 7 October 1981) has been a Lebanese talk show host on Al Jadeed since 2005. Her shows are Khedni Bhelmak (خدني بحلمك) and Kabsit Zir (كبسة زر).

In 2001, she participated in the talent show Studio El Fan, winning as a host, while she was still studying at the Lebanese University.

== Talk shows ==
- "Ekher Moda" (2018) on (Al Jadeed)
- "Khedni Bhelmak" (2016) on (Al Jadeed)
- "Kabsit Zir" (2012) on (Al Jadeed)
