= Maloum =

Studio album by Nawal Al Zoghbi
- Released: February 11, 1999
- Recorded: 1998
- Genre: Arabic Pop
- Label: Relax-In International

Nawal Al Zoghbi chronology
Mandam Aleik (1998)	Maloum (1999)	El Layali (2000)

Singles from Maloum
- 1. "Ghayarli Hayati" Released: February 3, 1999; 2. "Maloum" Released: June 6, 1999; 3. "Dal'ouna" Released: September 9, 1999; 4. "Tia" Released: January 8, 2000

Maloum (Arabic: مالوم) is the sixth Arabic language album by Nawal Al Zoghbi, released in 1999 produced by Relax-In international. It was released 1 year after the previous album Mandam Aleik. The biggest hit of this album remains "Dal'ouna" which was one of the best songs of the year 1999. Nawal sang this song on various TV shows including "Ya Leil Ya Ein", "A tribute to Lebanese President", "LBCI Anniversary Show" and "New Year's Eve Special" on MTV.

== Track listing ==
#	Title	Composer	Arranger	Lyricist
1	Dal'ouna September 9, 1999	Marwan Khoury	Roger Khoury	
2	Maloum June 6, 1999	George Mardirosian	Roger Khoury	
3	Enshallah June 1, 1999	Tareq Aref	Salah El Sharnoubi	
4	Tia January 8, 2000	Marwan Khoury	Boudy Naom	
5	Ghayarli hayati February 3, 1999	Tony Abi Karam	Jean Marie Ryashi	
6	Thanbi ya nas November 9, 1999	George Mardirosian	Roger Khoury	
7	Kalam El Lail October 11, 1999	Ahmad Darweesh	Sameer Sfair	

== Music videos ==
- Ghayarli hayati
- Maloum (I don't blame you)

This shows Nawal running everywhere including Paris and a stranded island from her lover who was stalking her. Video on YouTube

- Dal'ouna

Nawal is surrounded by dancers with the Greek them, the video was filmed in Prague.

- Tia

Tia, Nawal's daughter is in the video and it shows a lot of Nawal's touchable moments with her one and only daughter.

== Versions ==
- Three years after the release of this album, the bosnian singer Selma Bajrami made a bosnian version of Maloum entitled "Žena sirena" (Mermaid woman), that was released as part of the tracklist of her 2002 album, entitled Žena sa Balkana.
