= Mandam Aleik =

Studio album by Nawal Al Zoghbi
- Released: July 14, 1998
- Recorded: 1997–1998
- Genre: Arabic pop
- Label: Relax-In International Clap Production

Nawal Al Zoghbi chronology
Habeit Ya Leil (1997)	Mandam Aleik (1998)	Maloum (1999)

Singles from Mandam Aleik
- 1. "Mandam Aleik" Released: April 17, 1998; 2. "Ala Bali" Released: August 2, 1998; 3. "Galbi Dag" Released: November 11, 1998

Mandam Aleik (Arabic: ماندم عليك) is the fifth Arabic language album by Nawal Al Zoghbi, released in 1998 and produced by Relax-In international. It was released 1 year after the previous album Habeit Ya Leil and is still considered to be the biggest selling album of Nawal's career. The album had 3 major hits, the title song plus Ala Bali and Galbi Dag, all of which had video clips and extensive TV promotion.

== Track listing ==
#	Title	Composer	Arranger	Lyricist
1	El Ein Bil Ein May 14, 1998	Salah El Sharnoubi	Tareq Aakef	
2	Mandam Aleik April 17, 1998	Walid Rzeika	Tareq Aakef	
3	La Malama September 10, 1998Tareq Aakef			
4	Dig El Mehbaj May 21, 1998	Samir Sfair	Roger Khoury	
5	Ma Btetaab Dakhlak July 8, 1998	Elias Rahbani	Elias Rahbani	
6	Ala Bali August 2, 1998	Ziad Butrus	Ziad Butrus	
7	Galbi Dag November 9, 1998	Boudy Naoum	Boudy Naoum	
8	Law Ayez Tebood October 2, 1998	Salah El Sharnoubi	Tareq Aakef	

== Music videos ==
- Mandam Aleik (I don't regret on you):

Mandam Aleik shows Nawal trying to escape from the Mafia

- Ala Bali (I want to...):

This music video has Nawal flying to different countries in her bed and seeing things like the Eiffel Tower.

- Galbi Dag (My heart beat):

Nawal was pregnant in this music video so she didn't move at all. The music video was about a party in the jungle in a Spanish style.
