= Ayza El Radd =

Studio album by Nawal Al Zoghbi
- Released: 1994
- Recorded: 1994
- Genre: Arabic Pop
- Label: Music Box International

Nawal Al Zoghbi chronology
Wehyati Andak (1992)	Ayza El Radd (1994)	Balaee Fi Zamany (1995)

Singles from Ayza El Radd
- 1. "Ayza El Radd"

Ayza El Radd (or sometimes Ayza El Rad, Arabic: عايزة الرد) is the second album of Lebanese artist Nawal Al Zoghbi. The Album was released in 1994. Nawal First video clip ever was for the title song "Ayza El Rad" which was her breakthrough hit and made her famous throughout the Arab world. It is good to note that Nawal had an old clip that was a simple shooting of her song during a live performance, the song of Wehyati Andak which was from her first album, it can also be considered as her first television appearances.

== Track listing ==
1. "Ayza El Radd"
2. "Galbi Hawak"
3. "Asr Al Mougizat"
4. "Ya Leel Ya Bou Alashwak"
5. "Ma Iriftish Galbak"
6. "Tafreg Kther"
