= Claude Chalhoub =

Lebanese musician and composer

Claude Chalhoub كلود شلهوب
- Born: December 9, 1974 (age 50); Qaa, Lebanon
- Genres: Classical, Film Score, Chamber music, Orchestra music, Ballet
- Occupation(s): Composer, film composer, violinist, pedagogue
- Instrument: Violin
- Years active: fl. ca. 1994–present
- Labels: Teldec Records, Warner Music Group
- Website: www.claudechalhoub.com, www.imdb.com

Claude Chalhoub (Arabic: كلود شلهوب) (born 1974) is a Lebanese classical musician and composer.

He was born in Qaa, Lebanon in 1974, from a Christian musical family of 11 children. He started playing the violin at the age of eight. He attended the Lebanese Conservatoire before entering the Royal College of Music in London as winner of the prestigious Queen Elizabeth Scholarship award.

He is fluent in Classical Western music and Arabic improvisation, and was concertmaster for Daniel Barenboim’s ‘West-Eastern Divan Orchestra’ (1999- 2002). Furthermore, he was invited by Yo-Yo Ma to Tanglewood/USA to support him in his Silk Road Project.

His debut release on Teldec Classics International called Claude Chalhoub is the result of an exclusive recording contract with Canadian producer Michael Brook. The compositions consist of western classical elements being blended into a more Indian/Arabic flavor, with the addition of ethnic percussion and electronic effects. Claude Chalhoub plays on a Stradivarius from the Stradivari Society also featuring vocals from Farrukh Fateh Ali Khan. His second album Diwan exclusively in the sphere of classical music was produced by Herzog Records in collaboration with the Gewandhausorchester of Leipzig, Germany. The album offers original compositions for violin solo and orchestra with baroque and oriental sound images. In 2015, he produced the DVD Marionettes Dance, directed by Boris Penth in collaboration with the University of Music & Performing Arts of Vienna, Austria.

As a violinist Claude Chalhoub has performed the classical repertoire for violin as well as his own music world-wide and with the most renowned orchestras and magnificent musicians, including the Symphony Orchestras of London, Halle and Holland, Michael Brook, Farrukh Fateh Ali Khan, Tobias Koch, Calefax Reed Quintet, The Edmond Chamber Players to name a few. His repertoire includes Beethoven, Mozart, Khachaturian, Brahms, Bruch Violin Concerto, Korngold Violin Concerto, his own arrangement of Mendelson Violin Concerto in E. An example of his international versatility was a collaboration with the Holland Symfonia and the Dutch National Ballet who played & danced to his music at the Concertgebouw in Amsterdam.

As a composer, he is well known to the film as well. His compositions are used in ‘America Undercover, Persona non grata – Oliver Stone (2003)’, ‘Yes – Sally Potter (2004)’ or ‘Into the Wild – Sean Penn (2007)‘, he was commissioned by ‘Koran by heart – Greg Barker (2011) ‘ and playing the solos in ‘India: Kingdom of the Tiger – Bruce Neibaur (2002), ‘Caramel – Nadine Labaki (2007) ‘ and ‘Where do we go now – Nadine Labaki (2011)'.

In 2012, he composed and arranged the latest of Majida El Roumi's albums 'Ghazal'.

After many years in Beirut working among others as Dean of the chamber music department at the Lebanese National Higher Conservatory of Music he now lives in Vienna, Austria.

A film biography on Chalhoub’s life and career called ‘Singing on the Violin’ by German director Boris Penth (2007) has been broadcast internationally, among others on TV channels WDR, 3Sat, Bayerischer Rundfunk, ABC1, Arte, Euro arts, www.medici.tv, etc.

== Albums ==
His albums include;

- Claude Chalhoub (2001)
- Diwan (2008)
- Under My Skin (2020)
- Drifting (2021)
- Oremus (2024)
