= Mona Meraachli =

Lebanese singer

Mona Maraachli
- منى محمد مرعشلي
- Born: Mona Mohamed Maraachli; 15 July 1958; Beirut, Lebanon
- Died: 5 December 2016 (aged 58); Beirut, Lebanon
- Occupation: Singer

Mona Mohamed Maraachli (Arabic: منى محمد مرعشلي; 15 July 1958 – 5 December 2016) was a Lebanese singer.

She was born in Msaitbé, in the Lebanese capital Beirut to Mohammed and Nazek Maraachli and gained fame through her participation in 1973 in Studio El Fan (Arabic: ستوديو الفن) a televised Lebanese talent show broadcast on Télé Liban.

She was known for her warm and ethereal voice and interpretations of classics including songs of Umm Kulthum. She went to record her own songs collaborating with many composers and songwriters including the Rahbani brothers, Filimon Wahbe, Ziad Rahbani, Mohammed Madi, Faissal el masri, Nour el Mallah, et al.

== Death ==
She underwent surgery for gallbladder and died days later of a heart attack at the age of 58 just two months after the death of her mother Nazek Maraachli.
