= Simon Asmar =

Lebanese television director and producer (1943–2019)

Star-Maker (صانع النجوم) Simon Asmar
- Born: 2 January 1943; Ghazir, Lebanon
- Died: 11 September 2019 (aged 76)
- Citizenship: Lebanese
- Television: Studio El-Fann, Bab al-Haz (Gate of Luck), Laylet Haz (A Lucky Night) and Ahla bi Hal Talli.
- Spouse: Nada Kreidi
- Children: Wasim, Karim, and Bashir.
- Awards: Best Television Creator (1994) Sydney Key Award in Australia (1994)

Simon Asmar (Arabic سيمون أسمر: Born in Ghazir, 2 January 1943 - 11 September 2019) was a Lebanese television director and producer, and the creator of Studio al-Fan (Art Studio), the famous and one of the Arab world's first star-maker talent show in Lebanon, that is behind most famous Lebanese stars like Majida El Roumi, Ragheb Alama, Nawal El Zoghbi, Wael Kfoury and Assi El Hellani. Thus he was nicknamed the "Star-maker" (صانع النجوم). Asmar also produced several popular game shows, including Bab al-Haz (Gate of Luck), Laylet Haz (A Lucky Night) and Ahla bi Hal Tali (You're Welcome). He was also founded the River Arts (نهر الفنون), a theatre-style river-side restaurant and cafe with a large gathering his famous artists with their orchestras, and a destination for Arab and international tourists.

== Biography ==
=== Early life ===
Born in 1943 in Ghazir, he studied many disciplines in Paris including arts and sound engineering in 1960, then studied the arts of preparing and directing television programs in 1968, as well as preparing and presenting artists.

=== Education ===
- 1955 studied Arts and Electronics
- 1960 studied Sound Engineering
- 1961 studied the preparation of artists
- 1968 studied editing and directing programs

=== Career ===
Simon Asmar started his career in Tele Liban when his talents were discovered by producers which granted him the opportunity to work before he finishes his studies.

In 1972, his program, Studio El Fan, for Talents, was launched, the first of its kind in the Arab world. Since then, he has worked as a producer and director for hundreds of artistic, entertainment, political and cultural shows, in addition to competition and other programs in the Lebanese Broadcasting Corporation, where he became the director of its variety programs department, responsible for public relations, and a member of the board of directors of its programs. He worked in similar positions in Lebanon TV, before moving to MTV, where he worked until he died.

Simon Asmar was the owner and initiator of the idea of the River Arts (نهر الفنون), a theatre-style river-side restaurant and cafe with a large gathering of mainly his famous artists with their orchestras, and a destination for Arab and international tourists. The restaurant caught fire in 2006, for unknown reasons.

He was also the chairman of Studio El Fan, as well as the consultant and partner of Marwan Abu Al-Ghanem's Melody Art Production Company in Dubai.

Simon received more than 20 awards in Lebanon and internationally, including Best Television Creator in 1994, and the Sydney Key Award in Australia the same year, and the Encyclopedia of the International Year Award in 1997, and in 2003, on the occasion of the 44th anniversary of his services in the field of art, he was honored by the two immortal committees of giants of the East and Friends of Simon Asmar.

As for the total of his work in the audiovisual field, it exceeds 100 programs. Among the most prominent stars that he made were: Abdo Yaghi, Majida Al-Roumi, Walid Tawfiq, Ghassan Saliba, Rabih Al-Khouli, Ragheb Alama, Mary Suleiman, Assi Al- Hillani, Nawal Al-Zoghbi, Wael Kfoury, Elissa, Fares Karam, Rami Ayyash Myriam Fares and Zain Al Omr, as for the media, Nidal al-Ahmadiyya, Liliane Andraos and Abdul-Ghani Tleis; In poetry, Rudi Rahmeh; In music Jean-Marie Riachi, and Nicola Saadeh Nakhla, who succeeded in the art studio in the category of playing the oud.

In 2014, Asmar presented a program to launch talents under the name "Sawtak Chaghleh" (صوتك شغلة) with the singer Amir Yazbek, but he seemed not in his place and did not ownall the rules of the game.

After that, he participated in the last two seasons of " Celebrity Duets ",

He was member of the jury in the last two seasons of MTV's Celebrity Duets when he died, when his looks and offensive comments to the participants were criticized.

=== Marital status ===
He married Nada Kreidi on 10 February 1977, and they have three children: Wasim, Karim, and Bashir.

== Death ==
He was suffering from urinary tract health problems, prostate cancer, and complications affecting the kidneys, as he underwent a kidney transplant operation that necessitated his stay in the hospital to receive the necessary medical attention. He died on 11 September 2019, at the age of 76, after a struggle with kidney disease.

== See also ==
- Studio El Fan
- Lebanese Broadcasting Corporation
- Télé Liban
- Majida El Roumi
- Ragheb Alama
- Nawal El Zoghbi
- Wael Kfoury
