= Studio El Fan =

1972 Lebanese TV talent show

- Created by: Simon Asmar
- Country of origin: Lebanon

Production
- Camera setup: Multiple-camera setup
- Running time: 100 minutes (with commercials)

Original release
- Network: Télé Liban (1972–1981); Lebanese Broadcasting Corporation (1988–2004); Murr Television (2009–present)
- Release: 1972 – present

Studio El Fan (Arabic: ستوديو الفن, "The Art Studio") is a Lebanese star-maker talent shows in Lebanon, created by the television director and producer Simon Asmar with Alfred Barakat. The program has helped launch the careers of many Lebanese stars including Majida El Roumi, Ragheb Alama, Walid Toufic, Wael Kfoury and Assi El Hellani. The program started in 1972 on Télé Liban where it was broadcast during the 1970s and early 1980s. The LBC television proposed to take over the show in the early 1980s. It aired on LBC during the late 1980s, 1990s and early 2000s, until it was bought by the MTV in 2009.

== Past contestants ==
The show hosted many Lebanese and Arab stars, including:

- Majida El Roumi
- Walid Toufic
- George Wassouf
- Ragheb Alama
- Diana Haddad
- Bassima
- Nawal El Zoghbi
- Elissa
- Wael Kfoury
- Hady Khalil
- Rami Ayach
- Bassem Feghali
- Jean-Marie Riachi
- Fares Karam
- Fadl Shaker
- Assi El Hellani
- Suzanne Tamim
- Haifa Wehbe
- Darine Chahine
- Maher Jah
- Marwan Khoury
- Maya Diab
- Maya Nasri
- Mona Maraachli
- Walid Mourad
- Ziad Bourji
