= Yama Alou =

Studio album by Nawal Al Zoghbi
- Released: 26 July 2006
- Recorded: 2005
- Genre: Arabic Pop
- Label: Alam El Phan
- Producer: Mohsen Gaber

Nawal Al Zoghbi chronology
Einak Kadabeen (2004)	Yama Alou (2006)	Khalas Sameht (2008)

Singles from Yama Alou
- 1. "Rouhi Ya Rouhi" Released: September 1, 2005; 2. "Shou Akhbarak" Released: February 7, 2006; 3. "Yama Alou" Released: July 7, 2006; 4. "Ady" Released: December 1, 2006; 5. "Aghla El Habayeb" Released: June 6, 2007

Yama Alou (Arabic: ياما قالوا) is the tenth album from Nawal Al Zoghbi. It was released on 26 July 2006 and produced by Alam El Phan. It contains 13 songs in Lebanese, Egyptian and Gulf dialects.

== Track listing ==
#	Title	Composer	Arranger	Lyricist
1	Yama Alou	Mohamed Raheem	Amir Mahrous, Yahya El Mogi	Ikram El Assi
2	Habbaytak	Tareq Abu Jawda	Amir Mahrous, Tareq Habib	Ellias Nasser
3	El Assi	Mohamed Rifa'i	Amir Mahrous, Yahya El Mogi	Mohamed Rifa'i
4	Aghla El Habayeb	Hisham Ziad	Tony Saba	Ahmed Madhi
5	Adi	Abdallah Al Qouad	Tareq Akef	Sa'oud El Sharbatli
6	Bta'arifni Ana	Tareq Abu Jawda	Michel Fadhel	Salim Abu Jawda
7	Ayzak	Walid Saad	Amir Mahrous, Yahya El Mogi	Hany AbdelKrim
8	Betis'al	Walid Saad	Amir Mahrous, Yahya El Mogi	Hany Abd ElKrim
9	Gheeb Anni Gheeb	Altan Cetin	Jean-Marie Riachi	Tony Abu Karam
10	Akher Marra	Walid Saad	Amir Mahrous, Yahya El Mogi	Ayman Bahgat Qamar
11	Rouhi Ya Rouhi	Amr Mostafa	Amir Mahrous, Yahya El Mogi	Ayman Bahgat Qamar
12	Shou Akhbarak	Nicola Saade Nakhle	Michel Fadhel	Ahmed Madhy
13	Habiby Man Takoun		Baligh Hamdy	Khaled Bin Sa'oud

== Music videos ==
- Rouhi Ya Rouhi August 7, 2005
- Shou Akhbarak January 16, 2006
- Yama Alou June 21, 2006
- Ady December 12, 2006
- Aghla El Habayeb May 8, 2007
- Habbaytak November 15, 2007

== Reception ==
Yama Alou album was a success in the Arab charts (specially Shou Akhbarak song), and reviews were good. LoneReviewer website wrote "Yama Alou is a good album from Nawal, and remains one of her most accomplished work thanks to Alam El Phan (Mazzika) production".
