= Maher Jah =

Lebanese pop singer

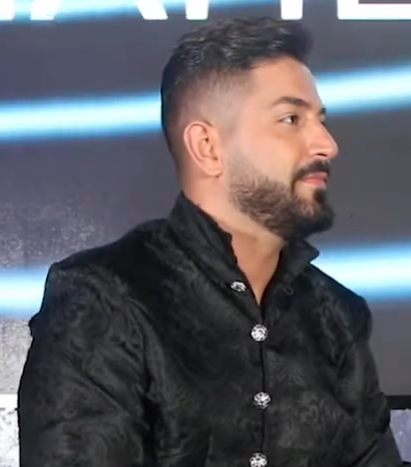

Background information
- Born: Maher Fawaz Jahjah ماهر فواز جهجاه; September 7, 1990 (age 35); Hasbaya, Lebanon
- Genres: Arabic pop and folk-pop
- Occupations: Singer-songwriter
- Instruments: Vocals
- Years active: 2010–present

Maher Jahjah (Arabic: ماهر جهجاه; born September 7, 1990), known professionally as Maher Jah (Arabic: ماهر جاه), is a Lebanese pop and Arab folk-pop singer-songwriter. He is the recipient of the silver medal in the pan-Arab-celebrated talent competition show Studio El Fan. Jah is known for his upbeat Arab folk tabl and percussion-heavy songs. His live concerts are especially popular in the Lebanese and Arab nightlife scene, in the Arab world, and within the Arab-speaking diaspora. A number of his songs reached the Official Lebanese Top 20 chart.

== Early life ==
Maher Fawaz Jahjah was born on September 7, 1990, in Hasbaya, a town in Lebanon's Nabatieh Governorate. As a child, he had a strong interest in music and singing, but he hailed from a modest household and had to work as a youth to supplement his family's income. Jah resisted his father's initial pressure to pursue a military career, and was later encouraged by his entourage, including his father, to cultivate his developing musical talents. At the age of 19, he participated in Studio El Fan, Lebanon's top star-maker talent show, and earned second place in the 'Classical Song' category. Despite the promise of a successful career in music, Jah pursued academic training and obtained a degree in architecture and topography from the Omar al-Mukhtar Institute in Lebanon in 2013.

== Career ==
In 2013, Maher Jah moved for work to the United Arab Emirates, and it was during his time in the UAE that he debuted singing professionally. Four years later, he returned to Lebanon and joined Taiga artist management. His first collaboration with Taiga Shefta Nayme, was met with popular acclaim. Jah's subsequent collaborations with Taiga, Wtʿazabet, Mish Leʿbi, Inte Hiye, and Akher Hami, were all Lebanese chart-topping songs. His breakthrough to a wider regional audience came with Bala Asl, in 2021. The following year, he released other self-written and produced songs including Alam Al Homra and Ghayrak Chab. Ghayrak Chab reached Top 5 on The Official Lebanese Top 20 upon its release in January 2023.

Jah is known for his pragmatic song choice, and for his energetic folk and popular songs renditions. He stated in a radio interview with Australia's SBS that he opted to follow the mainstream current of Arab folk tabl and percussion-heavy songs, which is trending with a large section of Arab young public. His work and live concerts are especially popular in the Lebanese and Arab nightlife scene, as well among the Arab-speaking diaspora in Arab states of the Persian Gulf, the Americas, Europe, and Australia.

== Personal life ==
Jah volunteered with the Lebanese Red Cross, in addition to his work and studies. He is married to Aya Al-Hassanieh, they have two child together.
