= Balaee Fi Zamany =

Studio album by Nawal Al Zoghbi
- Released: 1995
- Recorded: 1995
- Genre: Arabic pop
- Label: Music Box International

Nawal Al Zoghbi chronology
Ayza El Radd (1994)	Balaee Fi Zamany (1995)	Habeit Ya Leil (1997)

Singles from Balaee Fi Zamany
- 1. "Balaee Fi Zamani"; 2. "Wala Behemenni"

Balaee Fi Zamany (Arabic: بلاقيه في زماني) is Nawal Al Zoghbi's third album, released in 1995 by Music Box International. The two hit singles were Balaee Fi Zamani and Wala Behemenni.

== Track listing ==
1. "Balaee Fi Zamani"
2. "E’mel Ma’roof"
3. "Ma Te’taboosh Alaina"
4. "El Hobb Ebtada"
5. "Ma Tes’alneesh"
6. "Wala Behemenni"
7. "Zai Ma Lafayte"

== Music videos ==
- Balaee Fi Zamani

In the video we find Nawal singing on an island.

- Wala Behemenni

The music video involved used the latest technology of video effects at that time. Nawal Animation videos and photos where shown on several billboards and media in the streets in Beirut. As well as on famous international Magazines like ELLE.

The idea and the effects were new, and due to the success of this clip, director Mirna Khayat who directed the clip, got a good recognition by the media at the time.

It was worth to note that 11 years after this clip, that is in the 2006, we see nawal in a very similar clip with a similar idea of her animation of the media billboards in the streets of Beirut.
