= El Layali =

Studio album by Nawal Al Zoghbi
- Released: June 18, 2000
- Recorded: 1999
- Genre: Arabic Pop
- Label: Rotana

Nawal Al Zoghbi chronology
Maloum (1999)	El Layali (2000)	Tool Omri (2001)

Singles from El Layali
- 1. "El Layali" Released: March 27, 2000; 2. "Nassini Leih" Released: July 28, 2000

El Layali (Arabic: الليالي [el.læˈjæːli], English: the Nights) is the name of the Nawal Al Zoghbi's seventh album that was released in 2000 and was produced by Rotana. The single "El Layali" which was the last song added to the album and the first single to be released of it is considered to be Nawal's biggest hit in the Arab world gaining her ultimate stardom and is somewhat considered to be the peak of Nawal's artistic career. Following the huge success of this album, Nawal became the face of Pepsi in the Middle East signing a 5-year contract with them and filming many TV spots.

== Track listing ==
The album contains the following tracks:

1. "El Layali" March 27, 2000
2. "Bain Elbareh Wa Eyoum" November 6, 2000
3. "El Mamnou'a Marghoub" May 5, 2000
4. "Bladi" June 12, 2000
5. "Hobbak Bi'oyouni Maktoub"September 5, 2000
6. "Wa'di La Oyounak" December 10, 2000
7. "Al Yama" July 9, 2000
8. "Ma I'ndi Shak" April 4, 2000
9. "Nasini Leeh" July 28, 2000

== Music videos ==
- El Layali (The nights) : Released May 18, 2000

Nawal's biggest hit of all time. The music video was directed by Mirna Khyat. It shows Nawal dancing in a Moroccan style with backup dancers with her.

- Naseni Leeh (Why you forget me?) : September 14, 2000

This song was originally recorded for Nawal's Pepsi commercial, but she chose to make music video for it. The commercial was about Nawal singing to a Pepsi bottle like she was Romeo and the bottle was Juliet.
