= Wehyati Andak =

Wahayati Andak

Studio album by Nawal Al Zoghbi
- Released: 1992
- Recorded: 1991–1992
- Studio: Body Noam Studio
- Genre: Arabic pop
- Label: Studio El Fan
- Producer: Gity Media

Nawal Al Zoghbi chronology
Wahayati Andak (1992)	Ayza El Radd (1994)

Wahayati Andak (Arabic: وحياتي عندك) is the debut album of the Lebanese singer Nawal Al Zoghbi.

== Track listing ==
1. "Wehyati Andak" (Lyrics: Elie Bitar; Music: Georges Mardidossian)
2. "Ahleflak Bel-Hob" (Lyrics: Salah Gohar; Music: Samir Sfeir)
3. "Khoudni Maak"
4. "Iddamak Hallayn"
5. "Al-Dabki Lakini"
6. "Sarakni Hanini"
