= Shukri Lawrence =

Palestinian artist (born 1998)

- Born: 29 September 1998 (age 27); East Jerusalem
- Years active: 2014–present

Shukri Lawrence (born 29 September 1998), also known as Wifi Rider, is a Palestinian fashion designer, creative director, and multimedia artist based between Jerusalem and Amman. He founded the anti-luxury brand Trashy Clothing with Omar Braika and Cyber Fashion Week.

== Early life and education ==
Lawrence was born in East Jerusalem. He is a descendent of the Lorenzos who ran the Semiramis Hotel. His family's surname changed from Lorenzo to Lawrence during the British Mandate. As a teenager, Lawrence would use his Armenian mother's identity to avoid confrontations with IDF soldiers. Lawrence studied film in Jordan. He initially considered studying in Europe, but decided he wanted to "[create] stuff for my people. I want to have more Arab artists."

== Career and artistry ==
Growing up, Lawrence's early interest in the world of fashion was inspired by watching fashion television in the 2000s and manifested in putting together outfits for online avatars and video games in the early 2010s. He came up with the alias and username Wifirider or Wifi Rider when he created an Instagram account for digital art and editorialised photography in 2014. Lawrence's art is known for its bold use of colour and references.

Lawrence started his career directing a music video for Austrian rapper Candy Ken.

During his time at university, he began designing prints on shirts. In art and fashion, Lawrence found himself inspired by musicians such as M.I.A, Brooke Candy, and Die Antwoord. Lawrence implements "political satire and kitsch culture" into his work and aims to "shed light on the Palestinian cause". The Arabic equivalent of kitsch is sha'bi.

In 2021, Lawrence was the subject of British director Roxy Rezvany's short documentary titled Wifi Rider.

Lawrence has contributed both writing and photography to My.Kali.

=== Trashy Clothing ===
In response to users responding positively to t-shirt designs he shared on Instagram without initially intending to sell them, Lawrence founded the anti-luxury fashion brand Trashy Clothing (also stylised tRASHY CLOTHING) in July 2017 with Omar Braika. With Reem Kawasmi and Sereen Khass joining the collective, they debuted their ready-to-wear collection at the 2018 Berlin Fashion Week. The fashion show featured a literal wall on the side of the runway that partially blocked the view to symbolise borders and privilege.

Lawrence connected with the Icelandic band Hatari, who modeled Trashy Clothing's XD collection for spring/summer 2019. XD was inspired by 2010 Internet culture, particularly the dichotomy of Lawrence's engagement with the emo and scene subcultures from a place of occupation. They reunited for a collaboration titled Hatari x tRASHY, the proceeds of which went to Rainbow Street. The following year, Trashy Clothing did a shoot with the feminist group Pussy Riot.

In 2020, Lawrence and his label started Cyber Fashion Week, a digital fashion week combining the intersections of fashion, art, music, and performance. The concept of a virtual fashion week came about after Trashy Clothing had to postpone their Fall collection show in Iceland due to the COVID-19 lockdown. Cyber Fashion Week hosts 12 international designers showcasing collections on digital platforms with performances from musicians and virtual after-parties.

The brand's 2021 spring/summer campaign was titled Pride for Pay and dealt with the concept of pinkwashing. It depicted models being restrained and arrested, with zippers symbolising checkpoints, and also contained odes to the Arab pop icons Haifa Wehbe, Sherihan, and Maria Nalbandian. Lawrence said "it’s so needed for a label to be based here and be unapologetically queer, to be a home for other queer Arabs". This was followed by a Free Palestine t-shirt collaboration with the German brand GmbH, as well as the collection Souvenirs Of Conquest: Visit To Colonize!.

In spring 2024, Trashy Clothing made its Milan Fashion Week debut with Bourgeoisie, Mufflers and Oil, which took inspiration from the cartoons of Naji Al-Ali. Later in the year, the brand collaborated on a capsule collection with the Mexican brand Barragàn titled Arsenal of Democracy, which combines "Arab references… with Gulf-era propaganda, bloodied US iconography and pop culture allusions".

== Personal life ==
Lawrence is queer.
