= Majida El Roumi =

Lebanese singer (born 1956)

Majida El Roumi ماجدة الرومي
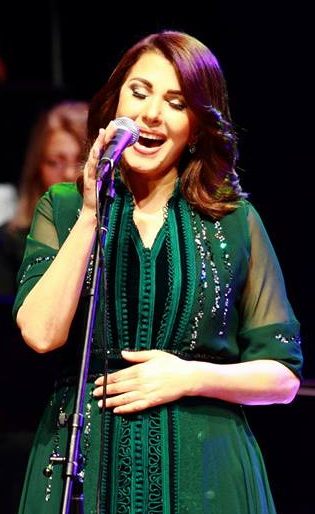
- El Roumi in 2013

Background information
- Born: Majida Halim El Roumi; 13 December 1956 (age 69); Kfarshima, Lebanon
- Genres: Arabic, classical, opera
- Occupation: Singer
- Years active: 1970–present
- Labels: Rotana Records; Universal Music Mena

Majida El Roumi (Arabic: ماجدة الرومي برادعي; born 13 December 1956) is a Lebanese soprano singer, songwriter, actress, and former United Nations Goodwill Ambassador.

== Early life ==
Majida El Roumi Al Baradhy was born on 13 December 1956 in Kfarshima. Her father, Halim El Roumi, was a Melkite Christian born in Tyre, South Lebanon, and her mother was Egyptian. Her father's family moved to Haifa in 1921 to avoid the hardships of World War I. The El Roumi residence was a meeting place for many cultural figures and singers.

At the age of 14, El Roumi appeared on Télé Liban with Najib Hankash, where she performed songs for Umm Kulthum and Fairuz. At the age of 16, her cousin Raymond Safadi, urged her to pursue singing as a profession. She participated in the talent show Studio El Fan in 1974 after sneaking out of the house with her brother and cousins. She performed for Layla Murad and Asmahan and won the gold medal for oriental singing.

Her success prompted her father to change his mind and give her his blessings to pursue singing as long as she continued her higher education. Later on, Majida graduated from the Lebanese University, receiving her BA in Arabic Literature. In 1975, Majida released her first single "Am Behlamak" (I'm dreaming of you, Lebanon) with collaboration with the Lebanese poet Said Akl and musician Elias Rahbani. The song, released at the outbreak of the Lebanese Civil War in April 1975, was very popular.

After releasing her first album Wadaa (Farewell) in 1976, Majida got the attention of Egyptian filmmaker Youssef Chahine. She starred alongside Hisham Saleem in her first and only movie Awdat Al Ibn Al Dal (The Return of the Prodigal Son) and performed three of the soundtrack's songs.

== Personal life ==
She married Antoine Dafone, and after years of marriage she separated from him, and publicly announced her divorce in 2003, following rumors about his relationship with a young singer. She and Dafone had two daughters and a son together, Alah and Noor and Ranush.

== Musical career ==
=== 1970s ===
In 1974, she was a contestant in the talent show Studio El Fan on Télé Liban and performed songs by Asmahan and Layla Murad at the age of 16.

=== 1980s–1990s ===
When she performed at Hunter College in May 1989 accompanied by a 19-piece orchestra, music reviewer Peter Watrous said: "she wandered between near-European pop and Middle Eastern pop".

=== 2001–2004 ===
In 2001, Majida El Roumi released a single titled "Nachid El Hobb" (The Hymn of Love) with lyrics from Dam'a wa Ibtisama (A Tear and A Smile) written by the Lebanese artist and writer Gibran Khalil Gibran. El Roumi chose this text after the UN ceremony in 2001, when she was named Goodwill Ambassador, and declared it to be the theme message for her mission of peace around the world. In 2001, Majida's sister Maha had to be transported to the US for better medical care, as she was suffering from cancer.

=== 2011–present ===
Majida wrote the lyrics of "Bokra" (Tomorrow), a charity opérette that was released on 11 November 2011. The single's proceeds were donated to various charitable initiatives with arts and culture programs aiming to raise funds for education projects in the Arab World. In an interview with Rima Maktabi in the CNN program – Inside the Middle East, Majida told the story of the new song which was produced by Quincy Jones and RedOne. In a surprising and unexpected decision, Majida announced that she had pulled herself out of the project. She said that the producer, Quincy Jones, did not meet her conditions and the team supervising and overlooking the project was not professional. Majida already put her voice on the operate, but when they asked her to record again in Qatar, she announced her withdrawal and waived her authorship rights when she backed out of the project.

==== "Ghazal" ====
Majida released her new album "Ghazal" on 22 June 2012 having worked on it for 6 years with many composers and poets.

"Biladi Ana" (My Country) is a duet between Majida and Senegalese singer Youssou N'Dour. Arabic lyrics are taken from Cadmus, Said Akl's theater play and French lyrics are freely inspired from the same theater play by Lebanese novelist Alexandre Najjar. Musical composition is accomplished by Joseph Khalifeh and Jean-Marie Riachi. This song describes Lebanon "the peace", "the beauty", "the creativity" and encourages fraternity, unity between people worldwide and calls for loving each other by surpassing all human differences. Majida and Youssou N'Dour have already performed it during the VIe annual Jeux de la Francophonie in 2009, hosted in Camille Chamoun Sports City Stadium in Beirut accompanied with more than 150 dancers.

==== "Nour Men Nour" ====
Nour Men Nour (A Light from Light) is the fourteenth studio album by Majida released in December 2013 produced by V. Productions. The album explores 12 Christmas carols exploring a wide set of musical genres including classical music and Opera preserving the same musical track that Majida had sung over the years.

The album peaked at the top of the music charts in Virgin Megastores in Lebanon from the day of its release for several consecutive weeks.

Nour Men Nour was promoted majorly online and on Lebanese radio stations by two singles, Sahrit Eid and Min lli Tall, as well as a teaser on Majida's official Facebook page. Majida also filmed a Christmas special episode aired on Christmas Eve on MTV Lebanon which included a live recital from Collège du Sacré-Cœur catholic cathedral in Gemayzeh, Downtown Beirut, and scenes from a visit she had to "Mission De Vie" charity center. As Majida stated, Christmas is an occasion to celebrate as a one big Arabic family, while she added that all sales income and profits went to charity to encourage the spirit of sharing in the Arab World during the unstable periods.

== Performances ==
Majida graced the Paris Olympia stage twice, the first time in 1993 and the second time in 1998, sponsored by the Lebanese First Lady at that time, Mrs. Mona Herawi, Palais des Congrès de Paris in 1987, Palais des festivals et des congrès de Cannes, Salle Gaveau, the opening of Damascus Opera House in 2004, Athens Concert Hall in Greece and the Royal Albert Hall in London which knew a huge success and was the first sold-out concert after The Beatles' concert in 1965. Also, later in the 90s, Majida welcomed Shirley Bassey in the presidential palace in Lebanon for a private concert, she opened in one song before giving Shirley the stage whose orchestra members stood up, astonished by Majida's spectacular soprano performance.

Majida has also performed at Avery Fisher Hall in Lincoln Center, Carnegie Hall and Hunter College in New York City as well as the Place des Arts in Montreal, Quebec, Canada in November 2003 attended by more than 3000 people with incredible standing ovations, then headed to Côte d'Ivoire in 2003 for two concerts which proceeds were returned as benefits to civil war orphans. The concert was attended by the country's president and First Lady. In 2007, Majida toured the US and performed in Fox Theatre (Detroit, Michigan) and the tour included nights in Paris Hotel in Las Vegas.

Majida was also part of the annual Mawazine Festival in Morocco in June 2010, and Jounieh International Festivals on 25 June 2011. She also held a concert in Royal Opera House of Muscat in Shati Al-Qurm district in Oman in November 2011.

In December 2006, Majida performed "Light The Way", a duet with the international opera star, the tenor José Carreras at the 2006 Asian Games opening ceremony in its 15th edition in Doha. In 2009, she performed "Nous sommes les amis du monde", a duet with Senegal artist Youssou N'dour, on the inauguration of the "Jeux Olympiques de la Francophonie" in Beirut, Lebanon.

Majida had a special TV appearance in Christmas time during a recital hosted in the Lebanese Presidential Palace. President Michel Sulaiman and First Lady Wafaa hosted many public figures, politicians and artists in this occasion. The recital was broadcast live on the Lebanese Broadcasting Corporation.

Majida El Roumi's concerts included a tour in the Arab world in 2012–2013; she was part of the Batroun International Festival 2012 and hosted a concert in the amphitheatre of the Katara Cultural Village, Doha. The summer of 2013 was very active with Majida's sold-out concerts. After her concert is Megarama Centre in Casablanca, Morocco, she was part of the 49th edition of Carthage Music Festival; she worked for the first time with the Tunisian Symphony Orchestra. It was a one of a kind concert for her in Carthage and M. Mourad Saqli, president of the festival confirmed that Majida's night ranks first in terms of income among the whole performances. She also visited Chokri Belaid's shrine to pray for this person who gave for his country so much, and "Ben Saadoun" children hospital checking up how could their hard cases be treated and taken care of, after hosting a press conference explaining how exceptional this visit is. Following her continuous success, concerts in Morocco were more demanded that she was part of the 9th edition of Twiza Festival in Tangier. and Timitar Music Testival in Agadir in its 10th year. Her visit to Tanger also included a visit to the children's orphan hospital in "Al Qortobi" center and give the kids some presents. Majida opened the Bahrain Summer Festival in August 2013, too; a full house concert with a wonderful performance with songs for love and peace on the Bahrain National Theater.

The Batroun International Festivals in Lebanon won Majida over one more time for another performance for the end of August in 2013. The country's political situation was unstable as her concert followed two consecutive explosions in Beirut suburbs. People attended the sold-out concert leaving with moments filled with Majida's voice. It was also the only concert ever that Majida sang "Kalimat" twice with historical standing ovations between each and every song of the program. Majida's first concert in 2014 and after 40 years of her career debut was for the closing season of Dubai Classics in February, it was held in Dubai World Trade Center. The festival opening was with international artist Sarah Brightman performing her Dreamchaser World Tour. Majida broke her 8 years of absence and went back to Egypt for a concert in March on the stage of Bibliotheca Alexandrina in Alexandria. Although Majida's Alexandria concert tickets were criticised for being overpriced, the event sold-out and was (as expected) a raging success. She opened her concert by a mix of both the Egyptian and Lebanese national anthem then sang most of her oldies and hits . In her press conference a day before the concert, Majida affirmed that the aim of this visit was just to encourage the tourism in Egypt after the crises the country has been through. She also pointed out she has nothing but respect for the June 2013 Egyptian protests emphasizing that she has no political intentions whatsoever. At the end of the concert, the mayor of Alexandria, Mr. Tarek Mahdi gave majida the golden key of the city in the presence of the minister of tourism in Egypt Mr. Hicham Zaazouh. A Day after her concert, Majida spent a touristic tour in the city and visitied Montaza Palace where she planted in its garden the first Lebanese Cedar since King Farouk's era, she also cried over Youssef Chahine's tomb as a loyal memory for the maker of her first movie.

In September 2021 Majida El Roumi fainted on stage while performing at Jordan's Jerash Festival, she returned minutes later to complete her set during the event's opening night.

== Public positions ==
Majida El Roumi was appointed an ambassador for the United Nations' Food and Agriculture Organization (FAO) on World Food Day, 16 October 2001 in an official ceremony in Rome, Italy. She has participated in numerous round-table discussions on the role of FAO ambassadors in helping the Organization combat world hunger. As FAO ambassador, Majida inaugurated the First Annual Agricultural Week in Lebanon and dedicated the book prepared by FAO Sanabel El Kheir on 8 November 2005 during an official ceremony to celebrate World Food Day 60th Anniversary at the UNESCO Palace in Beirut.

In her acceptance speech, Majida said: "While pursuing our dreams and hopes, we tend to forget the importance of our bones, and we end up wearing them out – we realize only when it is too late that we didn't take care of them. This is why I am participating in this campaign, to shed light on this truth, because if we are aware we can avoid this terrible disease and thereby avoid misery, sadness and a poor quality of life."

She was also chosen as an ambassador of the 'Alam Sagheer' (Small World) program, along with Titanic actor and producer Billy Zane, dedicated to education without borders. Majida said during a press conference that the event is evidence that humanity can unite for good and to make people's lives better anywhere in the world. She also thanked the organizers and hoped peace will spread all over the Arab world. The charity event was held under the patronage of Sheikh Nahyan bin Mubarak Al Nahyan, who described the festival as one that "celebrates human connections, international dialogue and strong support for the less fortunate of our fellow global citizens – values that are fundamental to our collective vision for the United Arab Emirates". The festival took place at Emirates Palace and expected to raise millions for underprivileged children across the globe. The Minister toured with Majida various booths of participating countries and they attended performances for each country including Lebanon.

In December 2012, Majida El Roumi visited the United Nations Economic and Social Commission for Western Asia (ESCWA) headquarters to follow up on the exacerbating problem of poverty in Beirut. El Roumi called for educating the youth since, "ignorance can only lead to poverty," as per her words. "Poverty is the cradle of wars, violence and corruption", she said, expressing hope that women would come to realize their true capacities and their equal worth to men. She also considered that art is a message that should be used for common good hoping that her message will prompt officials to tend to Lebanon's disadvantaged members of society.

In celebration of Bulgari's 130th anniversary, Majida El Roumi has been named the first Middle East Humanitarian Ambassador of the Bulgari – Save the Children Partnership in July 2014 and joins the likes of Naomi Watts, Dita Von Teese, Meg Ryan, Leighton Meester and so many others in the support of this worthy cause. The partnership between one of the industry's leading jewelry houses and the world's largest independent international organization running programs in developing and developed countries has generated over AED 98 million and benefited under-privileged children in 23 countries around the globe. El Roumi is responsible for the overall direction, leadership, and coordination of Save the Children programs in Jordan as it was told in the press conference that took place at Al Bustan Hotel, Lebanon, in the presence of a crowd of Lebanese journalists and dignitaries. The renowned Italian photographer Fabrizio Ferri has actively supported this initiative with his time and talent. Over the years, he has photographed over 200 celebrities wearing the ring and the pendant in support of Bulgari's commitment to quality schooling for the world's neediest children including Majida, whose poster was officially launched during the press conference. Majida clearly stated during the press conference "I will strive to bring joy to my surroundings and to the people who are in need of it. Everything that's happening is a crime in every meaning of the word. I feel that I have a mission and my appointment is for a cause that I truly believe in. I will travel the extra mile and do what I can regardless of the size of my mission." She also added, "There is no financial rewards for my participation in this humanitarian effort, as financial things do not bring happiness."

== Voice characteristics ==
"Al Hobb Wal Wafaa"
Sample From Al Hobb Wal Wafaa (2006) for Majida El Roumi with an oriental pitch in a hard melismas interval.

"I'm proud to be Lebanese, since my citizenship corresponds to such a marvelous, clear, irresistible voice like that of Majida EL Roumi; who rarely has any resemble, her talent equals her modesty, and her beauty equals her spontaneousness."

— Pianist Walid Akl

== Speeches ==
During many cultural, social and political events, Majida El Roumi always chooses to deliver messages or was asked to give a speech for the occasion. Some of her marked speeches are listed below:

- Ghazal's First Copy: In a passionate speech addressed to Lebanese, El-Roumi entreated her compatriots to join her in her mission of peace, rejecting wars and divisions in a special release ceremony for her album Ghazal. Majida chose to donate proceeds from her new album to student scholarships at AUB in 2012.
- Bikaffe (It Is Enough): A strong speech at the memory of the well-known Journalist Gebran Tueni after 2 years from his assassination. This speech is dedicated to all Lebanese people, leaders and especially politicians in 2007.
- Dialogue Between Generations: A speech Majida delivered in Jerash- Jordan about dialogue between generations in 2002.
- Maha: A poem written by Majida mourning her sister Maha, during a special mass in Kfarshima in 2002.
- Water: An article for Majida published in Lebanese newspapers on the International Water Day in 2002.
- World's Peace: Majida's speech on the International Day of Peace in Beirut in 2002.
- Telefood Day: An article for Majida published in Lebanese newspapers on the World Food Day in 2002.
- FAO Ambassadress: Majida's speech for her designation as the honorable ambassadress of the Food and Agriculture Organization (FAO) in 2001.
- Nizar Qabbani: A short message by Majida mourning the Arab poet Nizar Qabbani in 1998.
- Red Cross: Majida's speech about Red Cross at a concert in Tripoli, Lebanon in 1996.
- Rapture: Majida's opinion on ecstasy while singing in 1995.
- Cedar's Medal: Majida's speech on the occasion of receiving Lebanese Medal of the Cedars from President Hraoui in 1994.
- The Lebanese Song: A lecture Majida gave on the Lebanese song and music in 1992.
- Halim El Roumi: Majida's speech on the occasion of commemorating her father, Halim El Roumi, in Kfarshima- Lebanon in 1991.

== Discography ==
=== Albums ===
| Release year | Album | Label |
|---|---|---|
| 1977 | Wadaa (The Farewell) | Voix d'Orient (Sawt Al Sharq) |
| 1982 | Live Recordings | Voix d'Orient (Sawt Al Sharq) |
| 1983 | Majida El Roumi Wal Atfal (Majida And The Kids) | Relax-In by Ahmad and Mahmoud Moussa & CO |
| 1986 | Dawi Ya Amar (Moon So Bright) | Yousuf Haider CO. Kuwait |
| 1988 | Ya Saken Afkari (O Resident Of My Thoughts) | Relax-In by Ahmad and Mahmoud Moussa & CO |
| 1991 | Kalimat (Words) | Arabian Masters |
| 1994 | Ebhath Anni (Look For Me) | Music Master |
| 1996 | Rasael (Letters) | Rotana Records |
| 1998 | Ouhebouka Wa Baad (I Love You And More) | Farasan Productions |
| 2003 | Irhamni Ya Allah (Have Mercy On Me My God) | All Rights Reserved for Basilica of Our Lady of the Miraculous Icon – Ashrafiyeh |
| 2003 | Cithare Du Ciel (The Sky's Cithare) | All Rights Reserved for Basilica of Our Lady of the Miraculous Icon – Ashrafiyeh |
| 2006 | E'tazalet El Gharam (I Quit Love) | Good News 4 Music |
| 2012 | Ghazal (Flirtation) | V. Productions |
| 2013 | Nour Men Nour (The Light Of Light) | V. Productions |

=== Singles ===
Since the 1970s, Majida always released singles, with some of them were not included in her albums. She also performed many Christmas carols in several recitals, and dedicated patriotic singles for countries she visited. Most well-known singles are listed below:

| Song title | Poet | Composer | Notes |
|---|---|---|---|
| Adam Wa Hanan | Jamal Bkhit | Farouk Al Sharnouby | The soundtrack for Egyptian movie "Al-Akhar" (1998). |
| Ahenou Ilayka | Al Nasser | Abdel Rab Idriss | Performed many times on stage including in Carthage International Festivals in 2003 and in Dubai in 2004 |
| Ahla W Sahla | Majida El Roumi | Marwan Khoury | (to encourage tourism in Lebanon) Sang for the first time at the Batroun International Festival 2012. |
| Al Bahrain | Jamal Bkhit | Michel Jeha | Dedicated to Bahrain. |
| Al Qassam | Ali Al Sharqawi | Ihsan EL Monzer | Last performed in 2005, during the concert in Martyrs' Square, Beirut. |
| Nashid Al Salam (AL Zanabeq Al Baydaa) | Mahmoud Darwish | Joseph Khalifeh | First performed in a concert in Beirut Downtown in 2008 also in a concert in Egypt in the same year. |
| Ala Anhad | Abou El Kassem El Chabbi | Halim El Roumi | |
| Ana Habbaytak Ana | Eliya Abou Chedid | Nour El Mallah | Sang in 1986 at LBC TV program. |
| Assalama | Elie Choueiry | Elie Choueiry | Dedicated to Tunisia, last performed in 2010 during Carthage International Festivals. |
| Bakeer Fallayt | Majida El Roumi | Joseph Khalifeh | Dedicated to Halim El Roumi, performed in 1988 during a concert in Casino Du Liban. |
| Bel Majdi Wal Karama | Prayer | Example | Prayer released in a special album for Majida's daughter, Hala, distributed during the wedding ceremony in 2006. |
| Byawm Ersik | Talal Haydar & Majida El Roumi | Salim Assaf | Special wedding song for Majida's daughter Hala during her wedding, released in a special album and distributed during the wedding ceremony in 2006. |
| Domina | Dr. Souad Al Sabbah | Elias Al Rahbani | Dedicated for Kuwait. |
| El Madaen | Habib Younes | Elie Choueiry | Dedicated to Jordan. |
| Emmi | Eliya Abou Chedid | Elie Choueiry | Performed in 1988 during a concert in Casino Du Liban. |
| Ftahi Albik | Majida El Roumi | Richard Rodgers | With music from The Sound of Music musical in 1959, also a special wedding song for Majida's daughter Hala during her wedding, released in a special album and distributed during the wedding ceremony in 2006. |
| Ghadabak Nar (Al Thawra) | Elie Choueiry | Elie Choueiry | Patriotic (performed in 1988 during a concert in Casino Du Liban) |
| Hal Tasma'in | Majida El Roumi | Elie Choueiry. | |
| Hasnaa Carthage | Farouk Joueidy | Halim El Roumi | Majida sang a new version after Halim El Roumi previously performed it. |
| Jayi Men Beirut | Abdel Rahman El Abnoudi | Jamal Salameh | Patriotic |
| Kiriyalaysoun | Prayer | Ziad Rahbani | Prayer (1976) |
| Kouwait Ya Bilad El Salam | | Joseph Khalifeh | Dedicated for Kuwait. |
| Lebnan | Majida El Roumi | Jean Marie Riachi | Majida performed it only one time in Jounieh International Festival in 2011. |
| Lebnanikon Lebnanina | Elie Choueiry | Elie Choueiry | Patriotic dedicated to Lebanon performed many times in 2007 and 2008. |
| Lebsou El Kafafi | Talal Haidar | Nour El Mallah | Performed in Casino du Liban concert in 1988. |
| Ma Ajmal Al Oshaq | Al Nasser | Jamal Salameh | Performed many times on stage, including in the Olympia concert in 1998. |
| Ma Baddi Hadaya | Majida El Roumi | Joseph Khalifeh | A Christmas Carol released in 2005. |
| Murrou Bina Nashar | Habib Younes | Ihsan El Monzer | 1987 |
| Mouftaraq El Toroq | Salah Jahin | Kamal Al Tawil | Majida worked for the first time with composer Jamal Salameh in 1976 in the song's arrangement. The song was in Egyptian Arabic dialect and Majida sang it in the movie Awdat Al Ibn Aldal The Return of the Prodigal Son. |
| Nashid Al Hobb | Gibran Khalil Gibran | Joseph Khalifeh | Released in 2001 (1st edition) |
| Nashid Al Zafaf | | Majida El Roumi | Melody to Mendelssohn's Wedding March. |
| Tkhayaltak Jayi Men Biid | Eliya Abou Chedid | Ihsan El Monzer | 1988 |
| Tofli Zghiri | Majida El Roumi | Abdo El Monzer | 1994 |
| Touba Lel Sa'eena | Prayer | Ziad Rahbani | 1976 – Last performed in the meeting with the youth during Pope Benedict XVI's visit to Lebanon in September 2012. |
| W'sina | Henry Zgheib | Jamal Salameh | 1996 |
| Wajaba El Shokrou | Ibn Zurmruk | Halim El Roumi | A Muwashshah performed by Majida in the 80s. |
| Woulida El Massih | Prayer | Joseph Khalifeh | 1st edition released in 2005. |
| Ya Kouwait | Henri Zougheib | Elias Al Rahbani | Dedicated to Kuwait. |
| Ya Qatar | Elie Choueiry | Elie Choueiry | Dedicated to Qatar, the song was performed in Doha concert in 2006. |
| Ya Taleb Iddy | Said Akl | Zaki Nassif | Patriotic dedicated to the Lebanese Army released in the 80s and Majida last sang this song in Jounieh International Festivals in 2011. |
| Yarnou Bi Tarfen | Eben Jaber El Darir | Halim El Roumi | A Muwashshah performed by Majida in the 80s. |

=== Egyptian songs: remakes ===
| Song title | Poet | Composer | Notes |
|---|---|---|---|
| Ya Touyour | Youssef Badrous | Mohammed al-Qasabji | Originally sung by Asmahan |
| Layali El Onsi Fi Vienna | Ahmed Rami | Farid al-Atrash | Originally sung by Asmahan |
| Ehna El Tnen | Hassan Al Sayyed | Riad AL Sunbati | Originally sung by Leila Mourad |
| La Mosh Ana Lli Abki | Houssein Al Sayyed | Mohammed Abdel Wahab | Sung by Mohammed Abdel Wahab |
| Ha Laweaak | | | |
| Emta Ha Taaraf | Ma'moun Al Chinawi | Mohammed al-Qasabji | Originally sung by Asmahan |
| Ana Albi Dalili | Abou Saoud Al Abyari | Mohammed al-Qasabji | Originally sung by Leila Mourad and last performed by Majida during a concert in the American University of Beirut in 2009. |

== Filmography ==
- 1976: The Return of the Prodigal Son

== Videography ==
| Release year | Song title | Notes |
|---|---|---|
| 1975 | Am Behlamak Ya Helm Ya Lebnan | |
| 1975 | Kell Shi Am Yekhlas | |
| 1977 | Am Yes'alouni Alayk El Nass | |
| 1977 | Wadaa | |
| 1978 | Khedni Habibi | |
| 1988 | Ana Am Behlam | |
| 1988 | Min Elna Ghayrak | |
| 1989 | Al Madaen | |
| 1990 | Domina | |
| 1991 | Kalimat | |
| 1991 | Kouwait Ya Bilad Al Salam | |
| 1994 | Al Jarida | Directed by Sten Walegren. |
| 1994 | Kon Sadiqi | Directed by Sten Walegren. |
| 1994 | Lan Aoud | |
| 1996 | Aynaka | Directed by Ralph Dfouni. |
| 1996 | Hobbouka (Vol.1) | Directed by Corine Chedrawi. |
| 1996 | Hobbouka (Vol.2) | Another Clip release for this song directed by Ralph Dfouni. |
| 1996 | Qana | Directed by Georges Ghayad. |
| 1998 | Sayedi El Rais | Directed by Ralph Dfouni. |
| 1999 | Adam Wa Hanan | Directed by Khaled Youssef, from Al-Akhar, movie by Youssef Chahine. |
| 2000 | Beirut, Set Al Doniya | |
| 2001 | Nashid El Hobb | |
| 2005 | Al Hobb Wal Wafaa | Directed by Said Al Marouk. |
| 2006 | E'tazalet El Gharam | Directed by Nadine Labaky. |
| 2006 | Habibi | Tribute to Ahmed Zaki taken from a concert in Egypt in 2006. |
| 2008 | La Ma Rah Ez'al A Shi | Directed by Toni Kahwaji, taken from Beit El Dine Festivals 2008. |

== Honors and titles ==
- Tunisia: National Order of the work from the Presidency of the Republic of Tunisia in 1987.
- Lebanon: The Golden Cedar, 1988.
- France: Shield from the French National Assembly for 1993.
- Lebanon: National Shield of Honor of the Cedars, Knight's Order from the President of the Lebanese Republic, 1994.
- Algeria: "Algerian citizenship" Certificate from the People's Democratic Republic of Algeria, 1997.
- France: The Médecins Sans Frontières Shield in 1999.
- Egypt: Order of Merit from the Egyptian Journalists Syndicate, 2000.
- A Certificate and a shield of Honor for FAO Ambassador, 2001.
- Jordan: Honoring Shield from her Majesty Queen Noor of Jordan in 2002.
- Ivory Coast: The National Shield of Honor, Order of Merit of Officer's Grade from the Republic of Côte d'Ivoire, 2003.
- Syria: The Shield of Honour from the Syrian Ministry of Culture, 2004.
- Algeria: Le Bouclier de l'information et de la culture / Algerian Shield of Culture and Information and The Gold Medal for the fiftieth anniversary of the outbreak of the liberation revolution, from the President of Republic of Algeria in 2005.
- Lebanon: Honorary member of the Students' Scholarship Association at the American University in Beirut, 2005.
- Lebanon: Honorary President of the Lebanese Association for the prevention of osteoporosis and The Universal framework of the joints and bone disease – the Lebanese branch, 2007.
- Lebanon: Honorary Doctorate in Humanities from the Board of Trustees of the American University in Beirut, (2009).
- Belize: Patent of Lebanese honor and gratitude by the Universal Association of Lebanese Worldwide – Belize and the actual recognition of her efforts in the service of Lebanon, humanity and Universal peace (2009).
- Lebanon: Honoring from the Catholic Church on the occasion of an encounter of Catholic priests in Lebanon (2010).
- Morocco: The National Shield of Honour.
- Tunisia: The National Order of Cultural Merit from the Republic of Tunisia, 2010.
- Lebanon: The National Shield of Honor of the Cedars – Order of Commodore from the President of the Republic, 25 June 2011.
- France: Ordre des Arts et des Lettres – insigne d'Officier / Officer Grade, from the president of the Republic, 24 January 2013.
- Egypt: The Golden Key of the city of Alexandria from the mayor Mr. Tarek Mahdi, 20 March 2014.
- Spain: Order of Civil Merit, 2017
