= Habib Younes =

Lebanese poet, writer, and academic

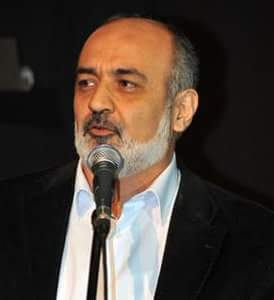
- Born: 1959 (age 66–67)
- Education: Lebanese University University degree BA in Journalism and News Agencies
- Occupations: poet, journalist and politician
- Known for: his poetic writings - his arrest - his sung poems
- Movement: The Free Patriotic Movement
- Parents: Anton Yunus (father); Laure Tarabay (mother)

Habib Younes (Arabic: حبيب يونس) is a Lebanese poet, journalist, political writer, and professor at the Faculty of Mass Communication at the Lebanese University, born in 1959. He has sixteen published books in his credit, He considered a reference in Arabic language. He has published dozens of studies and articles on various topics and in various magazines, newspapers and websites. He is a television programs journalist; programs are ranging from politics, history, culture and art. He is also a playwright, and the author of poems sung and composed by Lebanese artists. He also has a number of tunes in his credit, and he is a music critic. He is the recipient of the Human Rights Award, issued by the "Human Rights and Human Rights Organization" in 2004. He is one of the exciting Lebanese personalities.

== His life ==
Habib Antoun Younes was born in the town of Shatin (Tannourine), Batroun District (North Lebanon), on April 10, 1959, the firstborn of his parents, the poet Antoun Younes and Mrs. Laure Tarabay, and he has two brothers, Architect Dr. University Professor Farid Younes, and Immunology researcher Dr. Suhail Younes.

Regarding the beginnings, Yunus said in a press interview:

"If my father wasn’t the poet Antoun Younes, the founder of the Zajal band, I lived it when I was a child, perhaps I would not have been a poet. Then my teachers guided me to language and poetry. But this is not enough, the talent must be supported by self-development by intensifying reading, studying and learning from the experiences of others, to provide new experience instead of starting pointless."

Younes married the journalist and writer, Mireille Kassas, in 1989, and they have a daughter, Lynn, who was born in 1996.

He was arrested twice on two political charges. The first time in August 2001, in the era of Syrian tutelage, during the period of oppression and abuse that the Lebanese sovereigns were subjected to, so he was sentenced to 15 months in prison. As for the second time, he remained in prison for 69 days, as a result of a newspaper slandering him, on charges of incitement to murder. But he was released and his trial lasted for three years, to be issued in the end a ruling to stop the investigations on him.

=== Between the colloquial and the eloquent ===
Younes said in an interview about eloquent and colloquial poetry:

"I do not find a conflict between colloquial poetry and eloquent poetry. Rather, I see an integration that makes the image of literature more beautiful. The language is developing, and all the languages of the East are descended from a mother language that is commonly called Semitic. There is an advantage in Lebanese colloquial poetry that it is very old, especially in terms of its weights, and that it was on every lip and tongue in our villages and it is an essential element of our culture and our memory. It is poetry that we learn in society. As for eloquent poetry, you do not learn it except in school or university, unless you are one of its lovers and followers. "

He adds:

“I don't think of what language I write when I want to write a poem. There is a key word, or an image or an idea, that takes me to the colloquial or classical, and determines the weight and the rhyme, on its own. If only this talk about the conflict between the two languages ends, in the interest of encouraging Beautiful writing, especially in the age of advanced communication that dropped many barriers between societies, and made the characteristics of each dialect known to everyone. "

== His career ==
Since beginning his career, he has written about politics, history, literature, language, music and sports, and has moved between several media outlets. He worked in journalism before entering the Faculty of Media and Documentation at the Lebanese University and obtaining a BA in Journalism and News Agencies in 1981.

The most prominent milestones in his career are:

- A trained professor at the Faculty of Mass Communication, Lebanese University, Branch Two, in media writing, article art and the art of speech, and assistant supervisor of third-year graduation projects, since 2013.
- Lebanese OTV: the author and presenter of the program “We Will Be Here,” (transliteration: rḥ nbqa hwn) a program on the history of Lebanon, in which he met with leading historians and specialists, in 2015.
- Lebanese OTV: the host and presenter of the weekly political, intellectual and cultural program, in which senior politicians, cultural and intellectual leaders interviewed between 2007 and 2009.
- "Sawt El Ghad" Lebanese Radio: Director of news and political programs between 2006 and 2009.
- "Sawt Al-Mada" Lebanese Radio: Director of news and political programs between 2009 and 2010.
- Preparer and presenter of the program "Diwan Al Masa" on "Lebanon Al Thaqafa" radio, in which he hosted the leading poets of Lebanon from 2013 to 2015.
- "Comedy Production" company for the owner, Charbel Khalil: production and preparation of television programs between 2010 and 2013.
- The official Kataeb website: Writer of a weekly article between 2010 and 2014.
- He has worked with Lebanese and Arab publishing houses in the field of proofreading and reformulation, since 2010.
- Supervisor of the "Ink Chrome" series, published by Al-Karim Press - Jounieh, 2016.

"Al Masirah" weekly magazine: Managing Editor between 1985 and 1988.

- "Al-Hayat" Arabic newspaper: Editor-in-chief of the Beirut office between 1988 and 2003.
- Worked in “Free Lebanon” radio stations (one month - October 1981) and “Mount Lebanon” (presented a comprehensive sports program between 1983 and 1985), and took over the management of the “Voice of the Cedars” radio station and the editor-in-chief of its news (1989-1990), and “ Radiurama "(presented a variety of live broadcasts between 1994 and 1996).
- "CBN" American TV: Correspondent in the Beirut office between 1985 and 1988.
- "Guardians of the Cedars" newspaper, the university's weekly newspaper, where he progressed until he became editor-in-chief between 1977 and 1980.
- Al-Shabab University Weekly Newspaper: founder and editor-in-chief.
- The Lebanese daily "Al-Labor", the Arab and International News department, between 1980 and 1985.
- "Al-Hadith", the Lebanese expatriate weekly newspaper: Editor of the political page 1977–1988.
- Preparing the daily press report for the office of Sheikh Bashir Gemayel, commander of the Lebanese Forces and then president, between 1981 and 1982, and this report continued to be issued after the assassination of Gemayel, until 1983.
- “The Lebanese News Agency”: managing editor between 1983 and 1985.
- The Lebanese "LBCI" television station: between 1980 and 1985, in the preparatory stages that preceded it being broadcast on the air.

== Activities and awards ==
- He has given dozens of lectures in many Lebanese universities and forums, and has conducted political and cultural seminars.
- A master's study at the Lebanese University - Faculty of Arts, Branch 2, entitled: “Pain in Habib Younes’s Poetry”, was placed on his poetry in 2013.
- Winner of the Human Rights Award, issued by the "Human Rights Organization" - Lebanon, in 2004.
- Member of the "Cultural Transcendence Association" since 2012.
- Treasurer of the House of Poetry Cultural Association headed by the poet Ghassan Matar.

== His writings ==
Younes has many books in poetry, literature and theater, including:

=== In poetry ===
- “šِġْl mْḥābysْ”, poetry in the spoken Lebanese language, Publications of the General Guide for Prisons in Lebanon, 2003. He wrote between 2001 and 2002, and it is almost a poetry journal of the 15 months he spent in Roumieh prison.
- “ṣārw ālly fَwْq kْtārْ”, poetry in the spoken Lebanese language, Special Edition, 2008, which he wrote in commemoration of six of his family members who lost them respectively.
- “lَwْz ālnَّʿَsْ”, poetry in the spoken Lebanese language, Special Edition, 2008, Divan Ghazal, all of his poems are composed of two verses.
- “New Jahiliyya”, poetry in Arabic, a special edition, 2009, poems that tell the reality of the situation in the language and expressions of the jahiliyya.
- Age waits for no one “Transliterate: ʿmْr... mā bْyِnْṭُrْ ḥَdā”, poetry in the spoken Lebanese language, Special Edition, 2010, a collection based on the idea of absence and death.
- April passes us kisses “Transliterate: nَyْsَānُ yَmُrُّ bِnَā... qُbَlَā”, Fasha Poetry, Spinning Poems, 2014.
- "Angeloa Divan", poetry in Al-Fasha, 2015.
- Diwan “Wlad al-Ghsab Anan”, poetry in the spoken Lebanese language, 2015.
- “Ya Rayit Illit AlSama Shi Shwi”, poetry in the spoken Lebanese language, on 320 pages, and it is issued by the series “Kroum Al-Haber” - Al-Kareem Printing Press, highlighting the originality of man and the earth, fragrant incense and attends absence, 2017.
- maybe the clouds needs to drink water ‘transliterate: ymkn ʿ bāl ālġym šrbt my’ - poetry in colloquial Lebanese – 2019.

=== In the theater ===
- The author of the play “Talaa Min Rasi” and its songwriter poetry and melody, directed by Milad Hashem, starring Michel Ghanem, 2014.
- The author of the play “The Auctioneer”, and its songwriter poetry and melody, directed by Milad Hashem, starring Michel Ghanem, 2015.

=== In literature and prose ===
- "subject comes its object", Language and Politics, Special Edition, 2009, a prose book in which he combines grammar, politics, society and literature.
- Sticks of the sky, Special Edition, 2011, are very small stories dealing with various topics.
- The book “The Poet and the Antagonist… and Poetry in Between,” in association with Maroun Abu Shakra, an analytical and critical historical study, 2016.
- “Nada… The Man The Boy” ... a short story for young people, published by “Dar Mitra”, 2018.
- Cloud and Dust Icons - Prose - 2019
- Philosophical- so that Greater Lebanon remains great - 2019, includes a collection of articles that he selected from among dozens of his books or published, or words he gave on occasions or introductions, which he wrote for books throughout his career in the fields of literature and journalism.

==== Wahdak Al Kitar ====
- “Wahdak Al Kitar”, poetry and prose, in Arabic and Lebanese languages, a special publication in cooperation with Al-Karim Press - Jounieh, 2013, in which he collected poems, texts and introductions that he gave at political events related to the President of the Republic, General Michel Aoun, from 1989 to 2013.
- Wahdak Kitar ... and Aktar, poetry and prose, in both Arabic and Lebanese languages, a special publication in cooperation with the Al-Kareem Press - Jounieh, 2018, within the series "Krum al-Hiber", in which he collected poems, texts and introductions that he gave at political events related to the President of the Republic General Michel Aoun From 2014 to 2018.

== Poems sung by Younes ==
- “My Master,” which was written jointly with the poet Henry Zughaib and performed by the artist Majida Al-Roumi, as well as the poems “I will not return” and “Sing with me for love”, all composed by Jamal Salama, and three poems by Tunisia (composed by Ihssan Al-Mundhir) and Jordan (composed by Elie Choueiri) And the Sultanate of Oman (composed by Abdo Munther) and others.
- The poem "Write me a poem" by the artist Abeer Nehme, composed by Marcel Khalife.
- The poem "A Game Between Destruction" by Abdullah Mreish, composed by Lotfi Bouchnak.
- The song of Genrek in the series "Beirut City" by Cynthya Karam, composed by Teddy Nasr.
- He sang and composed his poems Wadih Al Safi, Hayam Younis, Elias Rahbani, Pascal Saqr, Hisham Boulos, Joseph Khalifa, Ziad Boutros, Zayn Al Omar and Jihad Hadshiti.
