= Nawal El Zoghbi =

Lebanese actress and singer

- نوال الزغبي
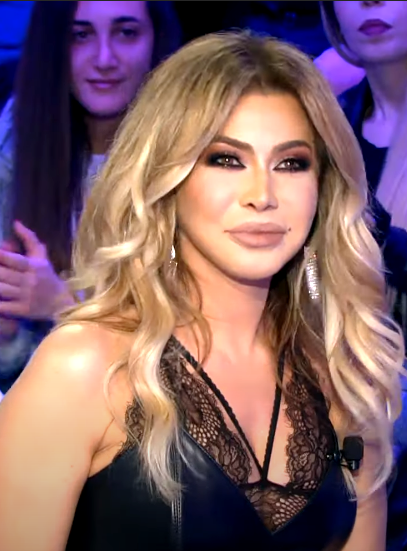
- El Zoghbi in 2020
- Born: Nawal George El Zoghbi; 29 June 1971 (age 55); Jal el Dib, Lebanon
- Occupations: Actress; singer
- Years active: 1988–present
- Musical career
- Genres: Arabic pop; pop; world; folk
- Labels: Relax In (1992–1993) – (1997–1999); Music Box International (1994–1996); Rotana (1999–2002) (2007–2009) (2019–present); Alam El Phan (2002–2007); Melody Music (2009–2012); Mazzika (2012–2016)

Nawal George El Zoghbi (or Al Zoghbi; Arabic: نوال جورج الزغبي; born 29 June 1971) is a Lebanese singer and actress.

She achieved popularity first by singing traditional Arabic music with a pop sensibility, and then by embracing newer trends in different music genres and scenes. She was among the most popular Arab artists during the 1990s, which propelled her to stardom in the Arab world. Nawal also holds Canadian citizenship.

== Biography ==
Born to a Maronite Christian family in the coastal town of Byblos (Jubeil), El Zoghbi holds both Lebanese and Canadian citizenship. She is the oldest born, and has two brothers and one sister. She began singing at an early age, despite familial opposition to the lifestyle of a musician. Members of her family changed their minds when they realized she was serious in her ambitions. In 1988 she participated in the Lebanese talent show Studio El Fan.

In 1990 she married Lebanese music manager Elie Deeb and went on to have three children with him. The couple legally separated in 2008, and El Zoghbi waited three years for the Maronite Church to recognize their divorce. In late 2009, El Zoghbi was granted custody of her three children and in March 2011, her divorce was officially legalized.

== Recording career ==
=== 1988–1992: Rise to fame ===
In 1988, El Zoghbi participated in the talent show Studio El Fan in which she demonstrated a great voice singing "Tarab" songs especially songs of her muse and diva Warda and was noticed by then director of the show Simon El Asmar. However, El Zoghbi decided to withdraw from the talent show.

=== 1994–2002: Stardom ===
El Zoghbi became the number one female star of the nineties, with revolutionary videos, looks and style.

From 1994 to 2002, she released an album almost every year, reigning as the number one female pop star of the Arab world for eight consecutive years. Each year between 1994 and 2002 had at least one huge hit by El Zoghbi. After her breakthrough hits "Ayza El Radd" in 1994 and "Balaee Fi Zamany" in 1995, she sang in 1996 a famous duet with Lebanese singer Wael Kfoury called "Min Habibi Ana"; this duo became the song of the year and of the decade.

In 1998, El Zoghbi released her biggest selling album Mandam Aleik, followed by the album Maloum in 1999.

=== 2004–2006: New success with Eineik Kaddabeen and Yama Alou ===
After a two-year break, her next album, Eineik Kaddabeen, was released in the summer of 2004. It was accompanied by two singles: "Eineik Kaddabeen" and "Bi'einek". The "Bi'einek" video was directed by Nadine Labaki and featured El Zoghbi dancing and singing on a fantasy stage among her fans. The video and the song became hugely popular, proving the continuing success of the "Golden Star" as the fans and media named El Zoghbi.

Immediately after promoting that album, El Zoghbi began work on her next project, Yama Alou, while releasing internationally a compilation album of her greatest hits to date through the EMI Music Distribution label on 24 November 2005.

She released the first single from her forthcoming album Rouhi Ya Rouhi in August 2005, marking the end of her five-year contract with Pepsi as she advertised the brand for the last time in this song's video clip.

The next single released from Yama Alou was "Shou Akhbarak" in February 2006 which was a big hit in Lebanon. Yama Alou was intended to be released throughout the Middle East on 17 July 2006; however, due to the Israeli attacks on Lebanon, its release was postponed. It was released on 26 July 2006 in Egypt and Saudi Arabia. In the following weeks, it was made available in other countries around the Middle East and was finally released in Lebanon on 14 September 2006, once the war was over.

=== 2007–2008: The face of LG mobile and "Khalas Sameht" ===
On 23 March 2007, it was announced that El Zoghbi would be producing her next album with the production company Rotana. She officially joined Rotana at a press conference at the Movenpick in Beirut on 28 March 2007. At a press conference held by LG Global at Dusit Dubai on 25 April 2007, it was announced that she would be the face to advertise LG cellular phones, which the company will put out in 2007–2008 in the Middle East. The conference was attended by a large crowd from over 100 various media outlets.

On 12 June 2007, El Zoghbi released the music video of her song "Aghla El Habayib" from the album Yama Alou, which was a continuation of the song "Shou Akhbarak" from the same album, and in which she promoted the new LG mobile. On 8 August 2007, El Zoghbi notably returned to the Carthage Festival after an eight-year absence.

Khalas Sameht was released on 22 January 2008 in El Zoghbi's native Lebanon. It was released internationally the next day. It reached No. 1 on the Lebanese charts the first day, and sold extremely well the first week. The first music video from the new album, titled "Albi Esalou", was first shown on TV channels on 5 February 2008. The album was then officially launched at a press conference in Cairo, Egypt, on 12 February 2008 while staying on the top of the Egyptian charts for almost three months. "Leih Moushtalak". the second music video for Khalas Sameht, was released on 25 July 2008 and featured El Zoghbi promoting yet another brand, Classy Lenses. No further releases came from this album.

=== 2009–2010: New management and release of 3 singles ===
Plagued by her divorce and in search of new management, El Zoghbi went through the most difficult phase in both her personal and her professional life. She started to work on her new album secretly while staying in the lights through the release of singles only.

On 29 May 2009, El Zoghbi released the single "Mona Ainah", which is in the Khaliji dialect. It began airing on radio stations in the Middle East and was first performed on the TV show Star Academy 6, on the day of its release. After many problems with Rotana not wanting to air it, "Mona Ainah" was then released by Melody in October 2009, as a music video directed by Yehya Saade. El Zoghbi spent her own money to make the video.

El Zoghbi left Rotana in October 2009 and signed on with Melody who went on to produce her next album, while her management was now taken care of by Pascal Mghames. On Mother's Day of 2010 she released "Faw2 Jrouhi", which was considered a very touching song that related to her own life with her children and ex-husband. The song spread fast and received a lot of press coverage. Also during the summer of 2010, El Zoghbi released "Amanah" as a single with a live video; the song was a moderate hit throughout the summer.

=== 2011–2012: Comeback with "Ma'rafsh Leh" ===
In 2011, El Zoghbi's 13th album Ma'rafsh Leh was released to positive reviews in February and was considered her comeback album after three years without album releases. Three months later, she shot "Alf w miye", which was the song of the year, staying 16 weeks in the number one position on Lebanese and Arab radio stations, as the video of her song had more than six million viewers on YouTube in just five months.

Later that year, El Zoghbi performed in many countries around the Arab world including Tunisia, Algeria, Dubai, Lebanon, and Qatar. Most of her concerts were broadcast on TV. In late December 2011, she released her second music video from that album. The title song was "Ma'rafsh Leih", another huge hit. Other songs from the albums that were not shot as video clips still gained a lot of success and were played heavily on radio stations; these included "Ha2oulak Eih" and "Hona El Qahera". In 2012, El Zoghbi released a live version of the song "Andak", from the same album. The video was taken from a live performance on Arab Idol and proved to be a fan favorite.

El Zoghbi's album Ma'rafsh Leih and her hit Song "Alf W Miye" won major awards in Lebanon for best album and best song of the year respectively. They were considered as a return to popularity for El Zoghbi since the album stayed more than four months in the number 1 spot of Virgin mega-stores physical album charts in Lebanon, Egypt and the UAE.

As a result of this huge success, El Zoghbi was crowned by the Murex d'Or Awards in 2012 as the "Best Lebanese Female Singer of the Year".

=== 2013–2015: Singles and Mech Mesamha ===
El Zoghbi released her single "Gharibi Hal Denyi" on TV and radio at the same time on 13 February 2013. The video for this single debuted on her official YouTube channel and had more than one million viewers in just two weeks. It became the number one song in the official Lebanese top 20 charts on 3 March 2013.

El Zoghbi released her first Iraqi song, "Ghazilni", in May 2013 with a TV performance on the Arab Idol prime. The song was well received by fans and music critics, and entered the top 10 of most airplay charts in the Arab world. It peaked at number 7 in the official Lebanese Top 20 charts on 9 June 2013.

El Zoghbi ended 2013 on a high note by winning the coveted awards "Best Lebanese Singer", "Best Song" and "Best Video Clip" for her single "Gharibi Hal Denyi" at the 2013 OTV Awards. The ceremony was held in Beirut for the first time this year and organized by OTV Network, a local Lebanese TV channel. The results were based on the public's vote.

In 2014, El Zoghbi won "Best Lebanese Singer with ongoing success" and "Best Looking Dress Of 2014″ at the Murex d'Or awards. Throughout the year, El Zoghbi appeared in high rated TV shows including Mr Lebanon 2014 and Star Academy. Her appearances at these events were in dresses made by Zuhair Murad.

El Zoghbi ended the year by releasing a new single, "Wala Bahebak", under "Alam Al Fan", with the video clip being released by Mazzika on 1 January 2015.

El Zoghbi eventually released her album Mech Mesamha on 27 August 2015, under the "Mazzika" music label. The album contained previously released singles as well as new songs, including the hit "Ya Gadaa" which was shot in Romania with the director Joe Bou Eid

=== 2016–2019: Singles and Keda Bye ===
El Zoghbi continued to focus on standalone singles, including Am Behki Maa Hali, Tewallaa, Bhebbo Ktir, La Telaab Maaya Alou and Bourj Al Hamal. In 2019, she released the album Keda Bye, which included the title track and several new songs, continuing her commercial success across the Arab world. During this period, she also maintained an active concert schedule and television appearances.

=== 2020–present: Aaks Tabiaa and Ya Mashaer, and renewed success ===
In 2021, El Zoghbi released the album Aaks Tabiaa, which included the title track and several new songs. She followed it with the album Ya Mashaer in 2025, which became one of her most successful recent releases. In the following years, El Zoghbi continued releasing singles, including Cute in 2026.

== International advertising campaigns ==
=== Pepsi ===
El Zoghbi was the first Arab singer collaborating with Pepsi in four ads.

=== LG ===
El Zoghbi was the face of the LG Shine mobile in the Middle East in 2007. She appeared with the phone in her music video "Aghla El Habayeb" from the Yama Alou album.

=== Classy Lenses ===
El Zoghbi advertised for the brand Classy Lenses and she appeared in them in her music video for "Leh Moushtakalak" in 2008 from the Khalas Sameht album.

=== Bonja Bags ===
In summer 2013, El Zoghbi became the face of Bonja Bags with huge billboard advertisements.

== Discography ==
=== Albums ===
- Wehyati Andak (1992)
- Ayza El Radd (1994)
- Balaee Fi Zamany (1995)
- Jadid (compilation album) (1996)
- Habeit Ya Leil (1997)
- Mandam Aleik (1998)
- Maloum (1999)
- El Layali (2000)
- Tool Omri (2001)
- Elli Tmaneito (2002)
- Eineik Kaddabeen (2004)
- Greatest Hits (Compilation album) (2005)
- Yama Alou (2006)
- Khalas Sameht (2008)
- Ma'rafsh Leh (2011)
- Mesh Mesamha (2015)
- Keda Bye (2019)
- Aaks Tabiaa (2021)
- Ya Mashaer (2025)

=== Music videos ===
Year	Title	Album
1990	Jayi Jayshak	
1994	Ayza El Radd	Ayza El Radd
1995	Balaee Fi Zamany	Balaee Fi Zamany
1995	Wala Bihemini	Balaee Fi Zamany
1996	Meen Habibi Ana	Duet with Wael Kfoury
1997	Habeit Ya Leil	Habeit Ya Leil
1997	Noss El Alb	Habeit Ya Leil
1997	Gharib Al Raai	Habeit Ya Leil
1998	Mandam Aleik	Mandam Aleik
1998	Galbi Daq	Mandam Aleik
1998	Ala Bali	Mandam Aleik
1999	Dalouna	Maloum
1999	Maloum	Maloum
1999	Tia	Maloum
2000	El Layali	El Layali
2001	Tool Omri	Tool Omri
2001	Haseb Nafsak	Tool Omri
2002	Elli Tmaneito	Elli Tmaneito
2003	Bilbaklak	Elli Tmaneito
2004	Bieinak	Eineik Kaddabeen
2004	Eineik Kaddabeen	Eineik Kaddabeen
2005	Rouhi Ya Rouhi	Yama Alou
2006	Shou Akhbarak	Yama Alou
2006	Yama Alou	Yama Alou
2006	Aadi	Yama Alou
2007	Aghla el Habayib	Yama Alou
2008	Albi Isa'lo	Khalas Sameht
2008	Leih Moushta'alak	Khalas Sameht
2009	Mona Ainah	Ma'rafsh Leh
2011	Alf We Miyi	Ma'rafsh Leh
2011	Ma'rafsh Leh	Ma'rafsh Leh
2013	Gharibi Hal Denyi	Mesh Mesamha
2015	Wala Bahebak	Mesh Mesamha
2015	Ya Gadaa	Mesh Mesamha
2016	Am Behki Maa Hali	Single
2017	Tewallaa	Single
2017	Bhebbo Ktir	Single
2018	La Telaab Maaya	Single
2018	Alou	Single
2018	Bourj Al Hamal	Single
2019	Sabah Sabah	Keda Bye
2019	Gowa Albo	Keda Bye
2019	Keda Bye	Keda Bye
2021	Aakli Wekef	Single
2021	Orkoss	Aks Tabiaa
2021	Alieh Ebtesama	Aks Tabiaa
2021	Aks Tabiaa	Aks Tabiaa

== Awards ==
=== 1997 ===
- "Lions" Award for the best singer in Lebanon & Jordan
- "Best Female Singer" in Lebanon
- "Best Female Singer" in Arabic World

=== 1998 ===
- "Best Singer" in the UAE

=== 1999 ===
- "First Arabic Singer"
- Best Female (Jordan)
- Best Female (Lebanon)
- Best Female (Egypt)
- Artist of the Year

=== 2000 ===
- Best Lebanese Singer
- Best Arabic Singer (Egypt)

=== 2002 ===
- Best Album – Dubai
- Best Singer – Egypt

=== 2004 ===
- Murex d'Or Award: Best Female Lebanese Singer of the Year
- Arab Music Awards: Best Female Singer
- Arab Music Awards: Overall Best Song
- Best Arabic Singer (Egypt)
- Best Album (Lebanon)
- Best Lebanese Singer

=== 2005 ===
- Best Arabic Singer (Egypt)

=== 2006 ===
- Best Arabic Singer (T-A-C)
- Album of The Year "Yama Alou" (T-A-C)
- Song of the Year "Yama Alou" (T-A-C)
- Clip of the Year "Yama Alou" (T-A-C)
- Best Dancing Song of the Year "Yama Alou" (T-A-C)
- Best Album "Yama Alou" (Lebanon Entertainment—LE)
- Best Song "Yama Alou" (Lebanon Entertainment—LE)
- Best Video "Yama Alou" (Lebanon Entertainment—LE)
- Best Dance Song "Yama Alou" (Lebanon Entertainment—LE)
- Entertainer Of The Week- 10 Times (Lebanon Entertainment—LE)
- Entertainer Of The Year (Lebanon Entertainment—LE)
- Best Fans for a singer (Lebanon Entertainment—LE)
- Best Arabian Artist (Arabian Awards)
- Best Female Singer award by AUST (Lebanon)

=== 2007 ===
- Best Arabic Singer (T-A-C)
- Song of the Year "Aghla El Habayeb" (T-A-C)
- Clip of the Year "Aghla El Habayeb" (T-A-C)
- Best Dancing Song of the Year "Adi" (T-A-C)
- Best Song "Aghla El Habayeb " (Lebanon Entertainment—LE)
- Best Video "Aghla El Habayeb" (Lebanon Entertainment—LE)
- Best Dance Song "Adi" (Lebanon Entertainment—LE)
- Best Lebanese Song "Aghla El Habayeb" (Lebanon Entertainment—LE)
- Best Khaliji Song for 'Adi' (Lebanon Entertainment—LE)
- Entertainer Of The Year (Lebanon Entertainment—LE)
- Best Fans for a singer (Lebanon Entertainment—LE)
- Best Fan Group (Lebanon Entertainment—LE)
- Best Website (Lebanon Entertainment—LE)
- Fashion Idol (Lebanon Entertainment—LE)
- Best Concert "Cartage" (Lebanon Entertainment—LE)
- Best Artist In A TV Show appearance for Kanat Khamas Noujoum
- Voting Star Winner (Lebanon Entertainment—LE)
- Best Arabian Artist (Arabian Awards)
- Artist of the Year (JE Awards)
- Gold Dulex Album (JE Awards)
- Favorite Female Artist (JE Awards)
- Best Dressed Artist (JE Awards)
- Best Album of The Year "Yama Alou" (JE Awards)
- Best Khaliji Song for "Adi" (JE Awards)
- Video of the Year "Aghla El Habayeb" (JE Awards)

=== 2008 ===
- Leih Moshta2alak – Best Song – Murex d'Or
- Best Song – Leih Moshta2alak MEMA

=== 2009 ===
- Most Successful Artist – Rotana (The Manager)
- Honored in Malaysia
- Ranked 5th on the list of Sexiest and Most Desirable Arab Women in 2009

=== 2011 ===
- Platinum Sales Album of the Year – Virgin
- First Candidate Album for The Arabic World Music Awards Prize

=== 2012 ===
- Best Lebanese Female Singer of the Year (Murex d'Or)

=== 2013 ===
- Best Lebanese singer (OTV Awards 2013)
- Best Song and Video Clip for "Gharibi Hal Dinyi" (OTV Awards 2013)

=== 2014 ===
- Best Lebanese Singer with ongoing success (Murex d'Or)
