= IndiePlex =

American premium television network

- Current logo used since 2006
- Country: United States
- Broadcast area: Nationwide
- Headquarters: Englewood, Colorado

Programming
- Picture format: 480i (SDTV); 1080i (HDTV); (HD simulcast on Retroplex and Indieplex only)

Ownership
- Owner: Starz Inc.
- Sister channels: MoviePlex; RetroPlex

History
- Launched: June 8, 2006; 20 years ago
- Replaced: INTRO Television

IndiePlex, stylized as indieplex since 2006, is an American premium television network which features independent motion pictures. It is a spinoff of MoviePlex and is owned by Starz Inc. The headquarters of IndiePlex and its sister channels MoviePlex and RetroPlex are located on the Meridian International Business Center complex in Meridian, Colorado.

On April 5, 2016, Starz was rebranded and added all the Encore channels to its moniker, therefore increasing the Starz channel lineup to 14 Starz movie channels. Its main channel was rebranded "Starz Encore" and carries repeats of Starz originals in addition to films.

On June 30, 2016, Canadian-US film studio Lionsgate agreed to acquire Starz Inc. for $4.4 billion in cash and stock.

== Carriage ==
IndiePlex is available nationally on Dish Network and regionally on select cable systems such as TWC Channel 621 SD only. IndiePlex and RetroPlex are currently available on Dish Network, Comcast, Atlantic Broadband and Verizon FiOS. Retroplex and Indieplex also launched simulcast in 1080i high definition on Dish Network on February 11, 2010.

The channel competes directly with SundanceTV and IFC, both of which broadcast independently produced or filmed features.
