= MGM+ =

American pay television network

- Logo used since 2023
- Type: Pay television network OTT streaming platform
- Country: United States
- Broadcast area: Nationwide; International
- Headquarters: New York City

Programming
- Languages: English; Spanish (as SAP option)
- Picture format: 1080i (HDTV); (downscaled to letterboxed 480i for the network's SDTV channel feeds)
- Timeshift service: MGM+ (East / West); (all three multiplex channels exclusively operate East Coast feeds)

Ownership
- Owner: Metro-Goldwyn-Mayer (Amazon MGM Studios)
- Parent: MGMPlus Entertainment LLC
- Key people: Michael Wright (President); Monty Sarhan (Co-EVP/GM); Jason Meier (Co-EVP/CFO); Nancy Cotton (EVP/Head, Scripted Programming)
- Sister channels: ScreenPix; YES Network

History
- Launched: October 30, 2009; 17 years ago (as Epix); January 15, 2023; 3 years ago (as MGM+)
- Former names: MGM+ Hits: Epix 2 (2010–23); MGM+ Marquee: Epix 3 (2009–15) Epix Hits (2015–23); MGM+ Drive-In: The 3 From Epix (2009–2011) Epix Drive-In (2011–23); Epix: (2009–23)

Availability

Streaming media
- MGM+: mgmplus.com (American cable internet subscribers only; requires subscription, trial or television provider login to access content) Available feeds: MGM+; MGM+ Hits; MGM+ Marquee; MGM+ Drive-In
- Apple TV Channels: Over-the-top TV (requires subscription or trial to access content): MGM+ (East)
- Amazon Channels: Over-the-top TV (requires subscription or trial to access content) Available feeds (East only): MGM+; MGM+ Hits; MGM+ Marquee; MGM+ Drive-In
- The Roku Channel: Over-the-top TV (requires subscription or trial to access content): MGM+ (East)
- YouTube Primetime: Over-the-top TV (requires subscription or trial to access content): MGM+; MGM+ Hits; MGM+ Marquee; MGM+ Drive-In

MGM+ (formerly known as Epix; pronounced epics and stylized as eᴘix) is an American premium cable and satellite television network owned by the MGMPlus Entertainment subsidiary of Metro-Goldwyn-Mayer, which is itself a subsidiary of Amazon MGM Studios. The network's programming consists of recent and older theatrically released motion pictures, original television series, documentaries, and music and comedy specials.

The service was originally launched as Epix in the United States on October 30, 2009, by a joint venture between MGM, Lionsgate, and Paramount. After MGM acquired the stakes of the service's co-founders in late 2017, and following the March 2022 acquisition of MGM itself by Amazon, Epix was rebranded as MGM+ on January 15, 2023. It was the culmination of a gradual transition by the network to utilize the imaging of MGM following the buyout, as well as Amazon repositioning it as a sister service to Prime Video and now defunct Freevee.

MGM+ is currently led by Michael Wright. Since he joined in November 2017, the network would expand its original program offerings (including Godfather of Harlem starring Forest Whitaker, Perpetual Grace, LTD starring Ben Kingsley and Jimmi Simpson, Deep State, unscripted series Unprotected Sets executive produced by Wanda Sykes and the return of The Contender).

The flagship channel and its three multiplex channels (depending on the carriage of any of the latter services) are sold by most traditional multichannel video programming distributors either as premium services or as part of a la carte digital movie tiers as well as by over-the-top MVPDs Sling TV, DirecTV Stream, Philo, FuboTV and YouTube TV.

MGM+ is also sold direct-to-consumer as a proprietary subscription video on-demand streaming television service of the same name, and through a la carte subscriptions independent of a traditional pay television platform sold by Apple TV Channels, Amazon Channels and The Roku Channel. Each digital platform provides a library of video on demand content and live streams of the linear MGM+ television channels (the standalone streaming service and the Amazon Video channel provide feeds of all four MGM+ multiplex channels; Apple and Roku subscribers receive only the East Coast feed of the primary MGM+ channel).

== Background ==
Paramount Pictures has been involved in the pay television industry since the 1950s. From 1953 to 1961, Paramount owned Telemeter, an ambitious but expensive theater television system that transmitted using closed circuitry—as opposed to broadcast frequencies—over which customers could purchase broadcasts by inserting coins into a collection box.

In April 1980, Paramount (then owned by Gulf+Western), MCA/Universal Studios, Columbia Pictures and 20th Century Fox partnered with Getty Oil to jointly develop a pay cable service to be named Premiere. The proposed channel would have maintained exclusive first-run rights to newer feature films distributed by each of the studios (which would have aired nine months before their initial telecasts on other premium channels—up to four months shorter than the average period between a film's theatrical release and their entry into the pay television market), along with carrying films cherry-picked from other studios without any exclusivity. Displeased that the venture would likely give the four studios disproportionate control of the pay television marketplace, Home Box Office, Inc. (then owned by Time-Life), Warner-Amex Satellite Entertainment and Viacom/TelePrompTer—then the respective owners of HBO, The Movie Channel and Showtime—proceeded to file an antitrust lawsuit against the studios with the U.S. Justice Department later that year. After reviewing the case, the Justice Department issued an injunction blocking Premiere's planned January 1, 1981, launch, deeming the venture to be an illegal boycott of the existing pay services that would subject them to possible financial damage if its presence resulted in price fixing of film titles. Paramount, MCA, Fox and Columbia decided to scrap the venture after the ruling was handed down.

In August 1982, MCA/Universal and Gulf+Western reached an agreement with Warner Communications to each acquire 25% interests in The Movie Channel, a struggling pay service then-owned by Warner-Amex Satellite Entertainment, a cable television venture of Warner and American Express, which would retain the remaining 25% share under the proposed collaborative venture. This proposal was driven by the studios wanting to increase revenue received from licensing their films to premium television services, and industry concerns that dominant premium service HBO would hold undue negotiating power for these rights through its acquisitions of film titles prior to their theatrical release. In January 1983, the proposal was amended to include Viacom International, which proposed to consolidate The Movie Channel and Showtime (of which Viacom had acquired the 50% interest inherited by Group W Cable through its prior merger with TelePrompTer for $75 million in August 1982) into one unit. Four of the partners would respectively own 22.58% of both networks, with American Express owning the remaining 9.68%. As with the earlier Premiere proposal, the Justice Department subjected the proposal to regulatory scrutiny as Warner, Universal and Paramount received 50% of their respective total revenue from film releases and licensing fees from premium services; the 30% share that would be held by the Showtime-TMC combination would have also formed an oligopoly in the pay cable market with HBO and Cinemax (which, even with the presence of smaller competitors at the time like Bravo and Home Theater Network, controlled the remaining 60% of the market).

The proposal was revised twice to address these issues and others cited by HBO executives in responses to a civil antitrust lawsuit against the Showtime-Movie Channel merger that was filed by the Justice Department on June 10, 1983. This culminated in Paramount and Universal being dropped from the partnership in the final revision submitted on July 28, 1983; Warner Communications, Viacom and Warner-Amex became the only partners remaining in the proposal, which a Justice Department memorandum cited would "prevent any anti-competitive effect [against other premium services wishing to enter the market] from arising," currying the department's formal approval of the proposal on August 13 (three weeks before it was finalized on September 6). Shortly afterward, Paramount signed an exclusive distribution agreement with Showtime, which had already maintained a licensing deal with Metro-Goldwyn-Mayer that gave the service exclusive pay cable rights to MGM's films.

Both of Showtime's tenures with Paramount ended in acrimony. In the spring of 1989, Paramount struck an exclusive licensing agreement with HBO; subsequently that May, Paramount filed a lawsuit against Showtime Networks, its parent Viacom, and the corporate parent of both entities, National Amusements over Showtime's alleged refusal to pay a total of $88 million in fees for five films—all of which had underperformed in their theatrical release—to reduce the minimum liability for its 75-film package from the studio. Showtime regained first-run pay cable rights to Paramount's films through a seven-year distribution deal signed in May 1995, in a byproduct of Viacom's merger with Paramount Pictures parent Paramount Communications the year prior; this agreement gave the services of Showtime Networks—Showtime, The Movie Channel and Flix—exclusive rights to all films released by the studio from 1997 onward starting in January 1998, following the expiration of Paramount's contract with HBO.

Metro-Goldwyn-Mayer (MGM) signed an exclusive first-run premium cable rights agreement with Showtime in 1981, encompassing the studio's films and releases through its United Artists subsidiary; Showtime and MGM renewed this agreement in April 1985 (for ten years, initially split with HBO and Cinemax), September 1993 (for six years, with an extension signed in March 1998), and in April 2000 (for nine years). The 2000 renewal deal also included a production development agreement to produce three original series—which would end up consisting of Dead Like Me, The L Word and the short-lived Barbershop: The Series—for Showtime between 2003 and 2007. (MGM had already produced some original programming for Showtime at the time of that deal, most notably The Outer Limits and Stargate SG-1, both adaptations of MGM-owned science fiction franchises.) By 2002, after that studio finished a long-term distribution pact with HBO and Cinemax, Lions Gate Entertainment joined Paramount and MGM as Showtime's major film suppliers. Paramount's distribution contract with Showtime expired in January 2008, three years after the original Viacom corporate structure was split into two standalone companies within the National Amusements umbrella: a successor entity that adopted the Viacom name, which took over Paramount's operations and select other divisions including the original entity's basic cable channels (among them, MTV, VH1, Nickelodeon and Comedy Central), and CBS Corporation, which—among the few properties it kept from its pre-split entity—retained ownership of Showtime Networks; MGM and Lions Gate's respective contracts with Showtime subsequently expired at the end of that year.

== History ==
=== Development and launch ===
The formation of Epix was announced on April 21, 2008, after individual negotiations between Paramount Pictures, MGM, and Lionsgate with Showtime to renew their existing film output deals broke down; each of the three studios disagreed with Showtime over the licensing fee rates for which they wanted Showtime to compensate them to allow future releases to air on the Showtime Networks services. In December 2008, the three studios—which named their jointly owned holding company for the channel, Studio 3 Partners (renamed Epix Entertainment LLC upon coming under the sole ownership of MGM)—selected the name Epix for their premium linear television and on-demand service; the partnership formally announced the launch of Epix at the National Association of Television Program Executives (NATPE) Convention on January 27, 2009. Mark Greenberg—who previously served as a marketing executive at HBO, executive vice president of Showtime, and managing director of management and consulting firm MSCGI (whose clients included Blockbuster Entertainment, Comcast and Lionsgate)—created the business plan and strategy, then partnered with the Lionsgate/MGM/Paramount consortium to build and launch the network. Greenberg served as the founding president and chief executive officer (CEO) of Epix, leading it from its creation in early 2008 through its acquisition by MGM, until he stepped down after a nine-year tenure in September 2017.

Epix's first logo, used from October 30, 2009, to April 18, 2019.

The network would focus on both recent feature films from Paramount (specifically those released after 2008), MGM/United Artists and Lionsgate (consisting of films released by each studio from 2009 onward) as well as library content from each of the studios. Within weeks of its October 2009 launch, Epix signed exclusive first-run film content agreements with two additional studios: one with Samuel Goldwyn Films to broadcast a package of 20 recent and forthcoming theatrical movies from the studio, and another to carry a package of 22 recent and forthcoming feature films from independent film studio Roadside Attractions (of which Lions Gate Entertainment had acquired a 45% minority interest in July 2007). Studio 3 Partners chose the Viacom subdivision MTV Networks (now Paramount Media Networks) to provide operational support, marketing services and affiliate distribution for the channel. (Through its ownership of both Showtime Networks parent CBS Corporation and the successor Viacom, National Amusements controlled four of the nine American pay television services then in operation—Epix, Showtime, The Movie Channel and Flix—from Epix's founding until Viacom divested its majority share in the channel in 2016.)

Though Epix was first announced by Studio 3 Partners as strictly a premium service, it eventually began to seek distribution as a hybrid premium/digital basic channel, although its programming would be presented without editing for airtime or objectionable content and without commercial advertising (a structure similar to the distribution method of Starz Encore). The channel also reportedly sought a monthly license fee of $1 to $1.50 per subscriber from prospective providers. Epix reached its first carriage agreement on July 28, 2009, when it signed a deal with Verizon FiOS. In contrast, that August, two months prior to the channel's launch, three major pay television providers—cable providers Comcast and Cablevision, and satellite provider DirecTV—each formally announced that they would not carry Epix. DirecTV said regarding its decision not to carry the channel: "We think there are enough [premium channels] out there already, we don't see the value of adding another movie channel."

On August 28, 2009, Epix offered a free preview to Verizon FiOS subscribers, showing select films that would be offered by the channel upon its formal debut. During this preview, Epix added between five and seven movie selections every three days from the libraries of its three major studio backers, including the premium cable premieres of the 2008 releases Iron Man, Indiana Jones and the Kingdom of the Crystal Skull, and Cloverfield. On September 25, 2009, the channel announced plans to launch an expanded online video on demand service—to be known as the "Epix MegaPlex"—that began offering a minimum of 3,000 film titles beginning in the summer of 2010, in comparison to the approximately 200 titles that the basic Epix online VOD service would include in its library upon the streaming service's official October 2010 launch. Epix's online offering includes over 3,000 titles for streaming, available to all subscribers through the network's apps and Epix.com; as a result, Epix offers a wider library of movies for streaming than the combined offerings by the streaming service of its premium network competitors. The network continues to expand its VOD selection through cable, satellite and telco operators; however, it does not include more than 150 to 200 titles per month due to the bandwidth constraints of these systems.

The Epix television service officially launched at 8:00 p.m. Eastern Time on October 30, 2009, on Verizon FiOS systems, becoming the first U.S. premium cable channel (not counting multiplex services of existing pay services) to debut since Liberty Media and Tele-Communications, Inc. launched Starz 15 years earlier on February 1, 1994. The first program to air on the channel was the film Iron Man, followed by the concert special Madonna Sticky & Sweet Tour: Live from Buenos Aires. Initially a single channel service, Epix was offered to subscribers of Verizon FiOS—which carried the channel for free during its debut weekend—for $9.99 per month (significantly less than the subscription rates of other premium channels, which normally range in price from $12.99 to $17.99 per month). Epix also provided customers—including those that were not Verizon FiOS subscribers—free previews of the online service each weekend through the end of November 2009, permitting access to the website's film content using invite codes given on a first come, first served basis.

=== Expansion ===
Cox Communications reached a carriage deal with Epix on January 9, 2010, the linear channel's standard and high definition feeds, along with its video on demand and online streaming platforms, were added to Cox's systems throughout the United States on April 1, 2010. Mediacom signed a carriage agreement with Epix on January 14, 2010.

On April 19, 2010, Epix gained its first (and prior to 2015, only) national pay television distribution partner when Dish Network announced that it would immediately begin carrying the channel as part of its "PlatinumHD" package; Subsequently, Epix launched its first two multiplex channels on the satellite provider during the 2010 calendar year: Epix 2 debuted first on May 12, followed by the August 11 debut of The 3 From Epix (now Epix Hits), which mainly carried movies released from the 1970s to the present. Dish Network would expand its relationship with Epix on February 16, 2015, as part of a carriage renewal agreement which made all four Epix channels available to subscribers of its over-the-top television service Sling TV as an add-on premium service, along with access to Epix's on-demand film and original programming content; Sling added Epix on March 4, 2015, with the four-channel multiplex being made available as part of the launch of its "Hollywood Extra" programming tier. (Sling currently offers all four Epix multiplex channels as a premium add-on for an extra fee, while Epix Drive-In is offered as a standalone channel available to all base subscribers of its Sling Orange and Sling Blue packages.)

On April 29, 2010, Charter Communications began carrying Epix as a package that offers both the channel's video on demand content in standard (150 titles at a time) and high definition (75 titles at a time), along with online streaming for $10 per month. On August 10, 2010, Netflix announced that it had reached an exclusive licensing deal with Epix, allowing subscribers of the streaming service to access movie titles released by Epix's content distributors to which the channel holds television and primary streaming rights. Titles to which Netflix gained access became available on the service less than one month later on September 1, 2010, with some newer films being released on Netflix within 90 days of their premiere on the Epix television and streaming services. On December 31 of that year, Suddenlink Communications reached an agreement with Viacom to carry Epix as part of an overall extension of its agreement to carry channels (such as MTV, VH1, Comedy Central, Spike and Nickelodeon/Nick at Nite) that the media company owned through its MTV Networks division.

On September 4, 2012, following the expiration of an exclusivity clause in the Netflix agreement that allowed Epix to license streaming rights to the channel's film titles to competing services, Epix entered into a three-year agreement with Amazon to provide film content on its Prime Video streaming service. Films appear on both Amazon and Netflix after the same 90-day delay period following their Epix debut.

Since its inception, Epix was among the first subscription television services to institute TV Everywhere capabilities; it was the first premium network to make its films available for streaming (beginning with the network's launch in 2009, its films were available via Epix.com), and was the first premium network to make its program content available on Roku devices, Xbox consoles, and the PlayStation 3 and PlayStation Vita gaming devices, and—by way of an app released on November 7, 2013, through a distribution agreement that Studio 3 reached with Sony Corporation to release apps on its precessor consoles on January 3 of that year—PlayStation 4.

On June 2, 2014, Bright House Networks—which had its carriage agreements negotiated on their behalf by Time Warner Cable, prior to its November 2016 merger with Charter Communications—added the Epix multiplex, with all four channels being offered to its subscribers in a three-month free preview upon its initial rollout. The following month on July 14, Epix signed a multi-platform distribution agreement with AT&T U-verse, in which the channel's content would be made available to subscribers through the website and apps of both Epix and U-verse, as well as on AT&T on Demand. On March 4, 2014, Time Warner Cable, one of the cable providers that initially declined to carry the channel, announced that it had reached an agreement with Viacom to begin carrying Epix and its multiplex channels effective March 18.

On August 31, 2015, Epix announced that it had signed a multi-year nonexclusive licensing contract in which Hulu would obtain the partial streaming rights to its feature film content. As a consequence of this agreement, Netflix announced that it would not renew its licensing agreement with Epix; all films from Epix that were made available on Netflix's streaming queue through the preceding agreement were removed when the contract expired at the end of September.

=== Buyout of Paramount and Lionsgate's interests ===
Second and final logo, used from April 18, 2019, to January 15, 2023.

The future of Epix was placed into question through transactions involving Paramount Pictures and Lionsgate during the latter half of 2016.

On June 30, 2016, Lionsgate agreed to acquire Starz Inc. (the parent company of rival pay service Starz, and its sister networks Starz Encore and MoviePlex) for $4.4 billion in cash and stock.

Later that year, on September 29, 2016, National Amusements CEO Shari Redstone sent a memorandum to executives at CBS Corporation and Viacom, intending to open negotiations for the two companies to re-consolidate into a single entity that would have likely included CBS's Showtime Networks unit among its properties; however on December 12, National Amusements rescinded the merger proposal, citing disagreements over valuation estimates of Viacom and Les Moonves' requests to maintain the relative managerial autonomy that he then held as CEO of CBS Corporation, should he be installed to head the merged company. Moonves resigned from his position as CBS' CEO on September 9, 2018, due to sexual abuse allegations from former CBS Corporation employees; CBS and Viacom would later re-enter corporate reunification talks in 2018; seven months after CBS was reported to be in discussions to acquire Starz from Lionsgate, National Amusements ultimately re-merged Viacom and CBS Corporation on December 4, 2019, to form ViacomCBS, bringing Showtime and Paramount Pictures back under the same immediate corporate umbrella.

At an investor's gathering in early January 2017, Lionsgate CEO Jon Feltheimer implied that it would explore strategic options regarding its stake in Epix—including a possible sale that would allow it to focus on Starz, of which Lionsgate completed its purchase on December 8, 2016, Feltheimer stated that Epix "is very valuable and throwing off cash," and that Viacom and MGM would "realize the value, which ever way we all decide is best for our companies." Financial analysts estimated that Epix would be valued between $1 billion and $2 billion (individually, Lionsgate's interest in the channel was valued at $458 million, MGM's interest was valued at around $277.7 million, and Viacom's interest was estimated to be worth around $739 million). On January 26, confidential sources with Studio 3 Partners confirmed to Reuters that Lionsgate had entered into discussions to sell its 31% stake in Epix to MGM and Paramount/Viacom; if a deal was reached, the two remaining partners would have become 50-50 partners in Epix.

On March 9, 2017, Reuters reported that MGM was in discussions to buy out the interests in Epix held by Lionsgate and Viacom (the latter of which was pursuing avenues, including the sale of non-strategic assets, to pay down its $12 billion debt load, and concentrate on restructuring Paramount Pictures and the services of Viacom Media Networks). These discussions culminated in a formal deal announced on April 5, 2017, in which MGM, Viacom and Lionsgate announced that they had reached an agreement for MGM to acquire Paramount/Viacom and Lionsgate's combined 80.91% interests—totaling 49.76% and 31.15%, respectively—in Epix for $1.032 billion (a purchase price based on a total evaluation of $1.275 billion for the channel, factoring in $75 million in distribution fees among each of the partners). On May 11, 2017, MGM announced that it had completed its acquisition of Viacom and Lionsgate's 80.9% interest in Epix, giving it full control over the premium network.

Under MGM control, Epix continued to expand its distribution to conventional pay television providers that originally declined to offer the channel, plugging much of the remaining gaps in its national distribution coverage. On November 28, 2017, MGM reached a long-term carriage agreement with Comcast to offer Epix as a premium add-on for X1 video subscribers and users of its Xfinity Stream app; Epix began to be carried on Xfinity systems on June 13, 2019. Comcast later expanded availability of Epix to act as a premium replacement for Starz (which the provider removed as a premium add-on one week later on December 10) on most of its Xfinity TV video bundles effective December 4. On April 12, 2019, MGM reached an agreement with YouTube TV to offer the four Epix linear channels as a premium add-on tier as well as provide access to Epix's VOD content to subscribers of the virtual multichannel video programming distributor (vMVPD) who receive the network.

On May 5, 2019, Epix and AT&T announced that Epix would be added to DirecTV effective May 19, making the satellite provider the last major conventional American pay television provider to begin offering the service. (The addition of the service to DirecTV's lineup had been expected since AT&T acquired it in 2015, as AT&T planned to unify the program lineups of its then two MVPD offerings). The agreement also stated that Epix would be available on companion vMVPD service DirecTV Now (since renamed DirecTV Stream), which began offering the Epix multiplex on August 8, 2019. On June 7, 2019, through an agreement between MGM and Amazon, Epix was added to Prime Video Channels as a premium add-on available to Prime Video subscribers. On June 16, 2020, MGM reached an agreement with Philo to offer the Epix linear channels (minus Epix Drive-In) as a premium add-on tier and VOD content offering to the vMVPD's subscribers. On December 11, 2020, MGM and FuboTV announced that Epix would be added to the latter vMVPD effective on that date.

=== Sale to Amazon and rebranding as MGM+ ===
On May 26, 2021, Amazon announced its intent to acquire MGM Holdings for $8.45 billion; the COVID-19 pandemic and the streaming market's increasing dominance due to the closure of movie theaters during the brunt of the pandemic were cited as contributing factors in MGM's decision to sell. Expected to close in mid-2022, subject to regulatory approvals and other routine conditions of sale closure, Metro-Goldwyn-Mayer and its divisions would continue to operate under the new parent company as a label under Amazon's existing content arm. It was unclear if Epix Now would continue to be sold separately from Prime Video, if Epix would continue to be sold a la carte through Apple TV Channels and The Roku Channel—which compete with Amazon's in-house Prime Video Channels platform—or if it will continue to maintain its film library sub-licensing agreements with Hulu and Paramount+ following the closure of the sale. The merger was finalized on March 17, 2022.

On September 28, 2022, MGM announced Epix would rebrand as MGM+ on January 15, 2023, coinciding with the premiere of the third season of Godfather of Harlem. Epix president Michael Wright explained the move as synergizing the service with the parent company and helping to boost public attention to the network, saying:

"We have felt for some time that this is the best service that many people have never heard of. [...] Other than individual shows, the service has never been marketed. Now you have this incredibly powerful, loud name that means something to people. You could spend five years and $100 million trying to launch a new brand, and you wouldn't have the brand equity that you get with MGM. It's really something of a gift."

Wright also said that adding a "+" to "MGM" is a signifier that while the channel will continue with a linear cable offering, MGM+ will also position itself as a sister service of Amazon's streaming services, alongside Amazon Prime Video and ad-supported Amazon Freevee (to the point Wright revealed it was Amazon who pushed for such a rebrand following the company's acquisition); the service is expected to remain an a la carte at the same monthly rate of $5.99 as before.

With the move, the service will also re-position to focus more on the network's original programming and the MGM film library, though it would continue to air recent releases from Paramount Pictures for the duration of their output agreement. The network's promotional trailer for the rebrand included the Paramount film The Lost City, as well as promoting it as the home of the cable television premiere of Paramount's Top Gun: Maverick. On the day of the rebrand's launch, That's Entertainment!, a 1974 film celebrating the history of the MGM musicals and a title from the pre-1986 MGM library owned by Warner Bros., was added to the network's streaming platform following the use of Judy Garland's recording of the title song in the rebrand's trailer. In late 2023, the service's visual branding and graphics were updated to incorporate elements of the MGM logo, including the filmstrip ribbon, the "Ars Gratia Artis" motto and a "Feature Presentation" bumper featuring studio mascot Leo the Lion. These were done by VFX and motion graphics company Imaginary Forces, under assistance from AFX Creative, based on the 2021 MGM logo by Baked Studios.

== Channels ==
=== List of channels ===
Depending on the service provider, MGM+ provides up to five 24-hour multiplex channels—all of which are simulcast in both standard definition and high definition—as well as a subscription video-on-demand service (MGM+ on Demand). Distribution of the service's three multiplex channels—MGM+ Hits, MGM+ Marquee and MGM+ Drive-In—varies depending on the provider. (Provider availability of the multiplex channels is noted within the descriptions in the table below.)

MGM+ transmits time zone-based regional feeds of its primary channel that operate on both Eastern and Pacific Time Zone schedules, though its multiplex channels are programmed exclusively on an Eastern Time schedule. The Eastern Time Zone feed serves as the default version of the primary MGM+ channel available though the network's OTT subscription service; the network's TV Everywhere platforms, and OTT channels on Apple TV, Amazon Prime Video and Roku; and most satellite, virtual MVPD and national wireline IPTV providers (including DirecTV, Dish Network, Sling TV, YouTube TV and Verizon Fios).

Except for AT&T U-verse, which transmits both coastal feeds in all of its markets, MGM+ largely geographically restricts distribution of its Pacific Time feed to providers in the Pacific, Mountain, Alaska and Hawaii–Aleutian Time Zones. Because each opposite-region feed is confined mainly to local wireline providers within its corresponding region of service (usually delineated by the Mountain–Central Time Zone line), the difference in local airtimes for a particular movie or program shown on the main channel between two geographic locations is wider for subscribers of providers that only receive the Eastern Time feed (as much as six hours between the Continental U.S. time zones), compared to competing premium services that typically package their main coastal feeds together.

Channel	Description and programming
MGM+	The flagship channel; MGM+ airs blockbuster movies, original series, documentaries, and comedy and music specials. The network's high definition feed broadcasts in the 1080i format, and all four networks listed below are downconverted to a 480i standard definition simulcast version on most wireline providers.
MGM+ Hits	MGM+'s secondary channel; it offers additional movies and specials, as well as repeats of original series and documentaries seen on the primary channel. The channel launched on May 12, 2010, and is available to subscribers of Xfinity, Breezeline, Cox Communications, Charter Spectrum (on systems formerly operated by Time Warner Cable), EPB Fiber Optics, Dish Network, Sling TV, DirecTV, YouTube TV and Verizon FiOS.
MGM+ Marquee	MGM+ Marquee features recent and older theatrical feature films and documentaries, as well as original stand-up comedy and music specials previously seen on the main channel. Unlike the primary MGM+ channel and MGM+ Hits, MGM+ Marquee does not air MGM+'s scripted original programs (e.g., Get Shorty, Deep State, etc.), although it occasionally offers past episodes of the network's unscripted series. Chronologically, MGM+ Marquee—originally known as Epix 3 (not to be confused with the channel formerly named The 3 from Epix, now Epix Drive-In) until August 31, 2015, and Epix Hits until January 15, 2023—debuted on January 1, 2012, technically being the fourth multiplex channel of MGM+ to launch. It is currently available to subscribers of Xfinity, Cox Communications, AT&T U-verse, Charter Spectrum (primarily on its legacy ex-Time Warner Cable systems), DirecTV, YouTube TV, EPB Fiber Optics, Dish Network and Sling TV.
MGM+ Drive-In	Formatted as a movie-centric service, MGM+ Drive-In focuses on action, comedy, science fiction, fantasy and horror films from the 1970s to the present (consisting of both mainstream and B movie releases). Chronologically, the channel—originally known as The 3 From Epix until December 31, 2011, and Epix Drive-In until January 15, 2023—originally debuted on August 11, 2010, as the third multiplex channel of MGM+ to launch. MGM+ Drive-In—which has more scattered distribution compared to its sister channels—is currently available to subscribers of Xfinity, Cox Communications, AT&T U-verse, YouTube TV, Charter Spectrum (primarily on its legacy ex-Time Warner Cable systems), EPB Fiber Optics, Dish Network and Sling TV (the latter of which offers MGM+ Drive-In to all base subscribers, separate from the other three channels in its MGM+ premium add-on). However, it is not included in the MGM+ tiers sold to customers of DirecTV, Verizon Fios and select virtual MVPD providers (except for Sling TV and YouTube TV).

ScreenPix
- Country: United States
- Broadcast area: Nationwide
- Headquarters: New York City, New York

Programming
- Languages: English; Spanish (via SAP audio track; some films may be broadcast in their native language and subtitled into English)

Ownership
- Owner: Metro-Goldwyn-Mayer (Amazon MGM Studios)
- Parent: MGMPlus Entertainment LLC
- Sister channels: MGM+; YES Network

History
- Launched: December 12, 2019; 6 years ago

Availability

Streaming media
- Xfinity Stream: Over-the-top TV (requires subscription or trial to access content): ScreenPix; ScreenPix Action; ScreenPix Westerns; ScreenPix Voices
- Amazon Channels: Over-the-top TV (requires subscription or trial to access content): ScreenPix; ScreenPix Action; ScreenPix Westerns; ScreenPix Voices
- Apple TV Channels: Over-the-top TV (requires subscription or trial to access content): ScreenPix
- The Roku Channel: Over-the-top TV (requires subscription or trial to access content): ScreenPix
- YouTube Primetime: Over-the-top TV (requires subscription or trial to access content): ScreenPix; ScreenPix Action; ScreenPix Westerns; ScreenPix Voices

=== ScreenPix ===
ScreenPix (stylized as SCREENPIX) is an American premium cable television network owned by MGMPlus Entertainment LLC, a subsidiary of Metro-Goldwyn-Mayer. Launched on December 12, 2019, as a spin-off of Epix, it primarily competes with similar companion services operated by HBO (Cinemax), Showtime (The Movie Channel and Flix) and Starz (Starz Encore and MoviePlex). ScreenPix relies on movie classics from the 1950s to the early 2000s from the libraries of MGM, Paramount Pictures, Universal Pictures, Sony Pictures Entertainment and The Samuel Goldwyn Company/Samuel Goldwyn Films, which are presented uncut and without commercial interruption, as well as a limited schedule of acquired classic television series.

Initially available exclusively to Xfinity subscribers, the channel was developed by Epix/MGM through an expansion of Epix's existing carriage agreement with Comcast that granted the flagship service extended distribution on Xfinity channel bundles, with the launch of ScreenPix coinciding with the addition of its parent network's three multiplex channels to the Xfinity lineup.

==== Channels ====
ScreenPix consists of a generalized primary channel and three thematic multiplex channels:

Channel	Description and programming
ScreenPix	The general-format "flagship" feed; ScreenPix focuses on a broad array of theatrical movies of box office and critical acclaim and some cult films, released between the 1950s and the early 2000s.
ScreenPix Action	ScreenPix Action focuses on action, adventure, horror and martial arts films.
ScreenPix Westerns	ScreenPix Westerns features a mix of classic Western movies from the 1950s through the early 2000s, as well as selected reruns of popular western series from the 1950s to the 1970s. Due to its carriage of a limited schedule of Western series from the 1950s to the 1970s, it is currently the only ScreenPix channel that airs series programming.
ScreenPix Voices	ScreenPix Voices is a channel dedicated to scripted and documentary films with "bold perspectives" by filmmakers of diverse ethnic backgrounds (with an emphasis on content from African American filmmakers).

=== Other services ===
==== Streaming ====
MGM+
- Logo used since 2023
- Website type: OTT streaming platform
- Available in: Dutch; English; French; German; Italian; Portuguese; Spanish
- Headquarters: New York City, New York
- Country of origin: United States
- Area served: United States; United Kingdom; Austria; Belgium; Germany; Italy; Netherlands; Spain; Latin America
- Owners: Metro-Goldwyn-Mayer (Amazon MGM Studios)
- Parent: MGMPlus Entertainment LLC
- Launched: February 10, 2019; 7 years ago (as Epix Now); January 15, 2023; 3 years ago (as MGM+)

MGM+'s over-the-top (OTT) subscription streaming service (formerly known as Epix Now) is available online and through apps for Android tablets, phones and Android TV devices, Apple iOS and Apple TV devices, Roku and Amazon Fire TV.

On February 22, 2018, Epix announced plans to launch an OTT streaming service to be sold directly to non-subscribers of the linear Epix service, alongside plans for 4K HDR streaming for their films on its Apple TV app (becoming the first American television network to offer its streaming film content in the format). The service was officially launched on Apple iOS, Apple TV and Android devices on February 10, 2019; apps for Roku and Fire TV devices were launched on March 28, and for Android TV devices on May 31, 2019.

MGM+ offers on-demand access to feature films from the network's content partners, a back catalog of episodes of current and former original series (with new episodes being made available for streaming on their original broadcast airdate on the main multiplex channel), documentaries produced for the service and through its third-party content partners, and stand-up comedy and music specials. The service also offers live streams of all four MGM+ multiplex channels, and offline viewing of app content via direct download. MGM+ is the only premium channel-streaming hybrid service that offers its associated service's full multiplex channel slate (by contrast, Showtime and Starz's OTT services provide only East/West feeds of the primary Showtime, Starz and Starz Encore channels, respectively; while Max doesn't offer live feeds of HBO and Cinemax.)

The network maintains an online and mobile video-on-demand service (originally known as Epix HD) that is available on MGMPlus.com, and also through apps for Android devices and Android TV, Apple iOS and Apple TV, Chromecast, Microsoft Xbox (both Xbox 360 and Xbox One), the Roku streaming player, select Samsung Smart TV models, and Sony PlayStation consoles. VOD content from the network is also available on virtual MVPD services Sling TV, YouTube TV, Philo, and FuboTV through add-on subscriptions to the linear MGM+ service; and its dedicated OTT video channels on Apple TV Channels, Amazon Video Channels and The Roku Channel. Except for subscribers of Hulu (which offers MGM+ as a VOD add-on without live feeds of the four-channel linear service), the streaming service requires a subscription to the linear channel through a participating television provider in order to access program content.

Previously, Epix offered an on-demand streaming service to the public dubbed the "Epix MegaPlex". It was launched on October 29, 2009; one day before the launch of the linear channel. Content available on the platforms (as well as Epix Now and the television-based Epix on Demand services) include recent and older theatrically released films sourced from its content agreements for the linear television service, Epix original programs, and VOD-exclusive film content from third-party library distributors (consisting of independent films, acquired made-for-television movies released between the 1980s and the 2000s, and older theatrical films released between the 1930s and the 1980s). Live simulcasts of the four Epix linear channels were also available to subscribers, depending on platform or mode of access.

MGM+ expanded internationally not long after, first launching in select European countries in April 2023, replacing the MGM International subscription video-on-demand service available through Amazon Prime Video Channels. MGM+ then launched as a streaming channel in Latin America in April 2024 and in the UK in May 2024.

Outside of the United States, MGM+ closed a content deal with Lions Gate Entertainment Corporation (now Starz Entertainment and then parent company of Lionsgate Studios) to take over programming from Lionsgate+ (formerly Starzplay), after the later had ceased its operations in those markets. The deal includes a package of premium films and television series from Lionsgate and Starz.

MGM+ launch rollout timeline
Release date	Country/Territory	Distribution partner(s)
January 15, 2023 (Note: Formerly known as Epix Now)	United States	Amazon Prime Video, Apple TV Channels, Roku, YouTube TV, OTT
April 8, 2023 (Note: Replaced the MGM SVOD)	Austria	Amazon Prime Video
April 8, 2023	Belgium	Amazon Prime Video
April 8, 2023	Germany	Amazon Prime Video
April 8, 2023	Italy	Amazon Prime Video, Mediaset Infinity
April 8, 2023	Netherlands	Amazon Prime Video
April 8, 2023	Spain	Amazon Prime Video
April 1, 2024	Argentina	Amazon Prime Video, Apple TV Channels
April 1, 2024	Bolivia	Amazon Prime Video, Apple TV Channels
April 1, 2024	Brazil	Amazon Prime Video, Apple TV Channels
April 1, 2024	Chile	Amazon Prime Video, Apple TV Channels
April 1, 2024	Colombia	Amazon Prime Video, Apple TV Channels
April 1, 2024	Costa Rica	Amazon Prime Video, Apple TV Channels
April 1, 2024	Dominican Republic	Amazon Prime Video, Apple TV Channels
April 1, 2024	Ecuador	Amazon Prime Video, Apple TV Channels
April 1, 2024	El Salvador	Amazon Prime Video, Apple TV Channels
April 1, 2024	Guatemala	Amazon Prime Video, Apple TV Channels
April 1, 2024	Honduras	Amazon Prime Video, Apple TV Channels
April 1, 2024	Mexico	Amazon Prime Video, Apple TV Channels
April 1, 2024	Nicaragua	Amazon Prime Video, Apple TV Channels
April 1, 2024	Panama	Amazon Prime Video, Apple TV Channels
April 1, 2024	Paraguay	Amazon Prime Video, Apple TV Channels
April 1, 2024	Peru	Amazon Prime Video, Apple TV Channels
April 1, 2024	Venezuela	Amazon Prime Video, Apple TV Channels
April 1, 2024	Uruguay	Amazon Prime Video, Apple TV Channels
May 20, 2024	United Kingdom	Amazon Prime Video
November 14, 2024	New Zealand	Amazon Prime Video

==== MGM+ On Demand ====
MGM+ On Demand, a television video on demand service, is available to the channel's subscribers at no additional cost. It offers feature films from MGM+'s distribution partners and the network's original series, as well as original concert and stand-up comedy specials that were previously seen on the network. MGM+ On Demand's rotating program selection incorporates select new titles that are added each Friday, alongside existing program titles held over from the previous one to two weeks. It is available to MGM+ subscribers of, among other providers, Charter Communications (including the former Time Warner Cable and Bright House Networks systems that are now part of Charter Spectrum), Cox Communications, Dish Network, Mediacom, Sling TV, and Verizon FiOS.

== Movie library ==
MGM+ has an exclusive first-run agreement with Metro-Goldwyn-Mayer. As of 2026, films featured on the channel primarily include recent releases and film library content from namesake Metro-Goldwyn-Mayer (along with content from subsidiary Orion Pictures, American International Pictures, United Artists, and library product from Amazon MGM Studios, The Samuel Goldwyn Company, Motion Picture Corporation of America and PolyGram Filmed Entertainment)—and formerly feature films from Paramount Skydance-owned Paramount Pictures (along with film content from its subsidiaries Paramount Players, Paramount Animation, MTV Entertainment Studios, Comedy Central Films, BET Films and Nickelodeon Movies as well as library product from now-defunct units Paramount Vantage, Republic Pictures and Insurge Pictures—all for films released prior to 2026) and Lionsgate Studios (for films released prior to 2020), Samuel Goldwyn Films, and Roadside Attractions. (Lionsgate holds a 45% stake in Roadside, with the remaining interest primarily held by studio founders Howard Cohen and Eric d'Arbeloff.)

Since June 2019, the channel also carries sub-licensed library movie product from Paramount Pictures (along with film content from its subsidiaries Paramount Players, Paramount Animation, MTV Entertainment Studios, Comedy Central Films, BET Films and Nickelodeon Movies as well as library product from now-defunct units Paramount Vantage, Republic Pictures and Insurge Pictures—all for films released prior to 2026), Lions Gate Entertainment (along with content from subsidiaries Summit Entertainment, Grindstone Entertainment Group and Pantelion Films and now-defunct/former units Mandate Pictures, Artisan Entertainment, Codeblack Films, Mandalay Pictures, Maple Pictures, Prism Pictures and Trimark Pictures, all for films released prior to 2020), Sony Pictures Entertainment (which includes films from Columbia Pictures, TriStar Pictures, Sony Pictures Classics, Screen Gems and Morgan Creek Entertainment, among others); the Sony library deal encompasses MGM+'s three multiplex services, MGM+ Hits, MGM+ Marquee and MGM+ Drive-In, and was extended to include sister service ScreenPix upon its December 2019 debut. (Sony also maintained a pay television licensing agreement with Starz, from 2004 to 2021, for the studio's recent theatrical releases.). Since November 2020, the channel also carries sub-licensed library movie product from Walt Disney Studios (including content from 20th Century Studios and Touchstone Pictures), Warner Bros. Entertainment (including content from New Line Cinema, Castle Rock Entertainment and Turner Entertainment, who owns pre-May 1986 MGM titles), and maintains VOD-exclusive rights to films distributed by Screen Media Films, Sonar Entertainment and Gravitas Ventures, and in February 2024 will handle a pay TV deal licensing agreement library movie product from Universal Pictures.

Although Lionsgate acquired Summit Entertainment in January 2012, that studio maintained an existing film output deal with rival HBO, which began in 2013 through an initial five-year deal covering all Summit releases through 2017; Summit renewed the HBO contract for four additional years (extending to films released through 2022) on March 1, 2016, and as such, Summit's films were also restricted from airing on the networks of Lionsgate-owned competitor Starz. On June 11, 2019, Lionsgate signed a two-year exclusive first-run distribution deal with Walt Disney Company-controlled Hulu and FX to take effect following the expiration of Epix's contract with Lionsgate at the end of 2019; under the deal, in which Epix would retain pay-cable/streaming rights to films released by the studio prior to December 31, 2019, Lionsgate's 2020 and 2021 theatrical releases were to be made available on Hulu and FX between the second half of 2020 and 2021, before the studio transitioned back into a traditional pay-cable window via Lionsgate-owned Starz in 2022. Despite the December 2019 re-merger of Viacom and CBS Corporation bringing Paramount Pictures and Showtime back under common ownership, on February 24, 2021, Paramount renewed its output deal with Epix in a multi-platform agreement that, along with continuing to allow the network's platforms to offer recent Paramount releases, gives Paramount+ right of first refusal for most of the studio's future theatrical releases (although the streaming service will provide exhibitory deference to Epix for certain titles that the former elects not to offer first under the two-track distribution window), and sub-licensing rights to both the complete Epix film library (similar to the network's arrangements with Prime Video and Hulu) and to future MGM releases that have concluded their initial Epix exclusivity window. Paramount's output deal with MGM+ was renewed for another 2 years, extending the studio's output deal through the end of 2025.

The window between a film's initial release in theaters and its initial airing on MGM+ is stated to be slightly reduced in comparison to the grace period between its theatrical release and its first pay television broadcast on either HBO/Cinemax, Showtime or Starz; as such, films will have a longer broadcast duration during their term of license agreement than is currently possible with the other major premium channels. MGM+'s programming format is similar to that of the primary channel of Starz Encore, in that its schedule includes recent film releases that are interspersed with older movies released between the 1970s and the 1990s, with recently released films often scheduled alongside the older film titles during daytime and prime time slots.

== Original programming ==
Prior to the network's launch, Epix ordered its first original series pilot Tough Trade (to have been produced by then-corporate sister Lionsgate Television). The drama, created by Jenji Kohan (creator of Weeds and Orange Is the New Black), was to have centered on three generations of a dysfunctional family involved in country music. The pilot was filmed in late summer 2009 in Nashville, with the intent of being picked up to series for a 2010 debut; however, Epix declined to greenlight Tough Trade for a series order. The network's first original comedy special, Lewis Black's Stark Raving Black, premiered on the channel on December 5, 2009.

Laverne McKinnon (who previously served as head of drama development for CBS), resigned from her role as executive vice president of original programming and development for Epix on August 4, 2011. Thereafter, Epix remained active in producing other original programming exclusively for the channel, including documentaries, sports, comedy, and music specials. On June 30, 2012, Epix launched a monthly comedy special showcase called "Epix Comedy Unbound", consisting of a new special premiering on the final weekend of each month; the first special to be aired as part of the showcase was Jim Norton: Please Be Offended.

In early 2015, Epix renewed its original scripted programming efforts after a four-year hiatus, emphasizing development of drama series. These plans were cemented on January 12, 2015, when Epix hired Jocelyn Diaz—who, immediately prior to her appointment, had served as vice president of production at The Walt Disney Studios, and was previously head of drama development at HBO—as its executive vice president of original programming and development.

On July 8 of that year, Epix announced its first original scripted project to be picked up as a series, both of which are set for a fall 2016 debut: Graves, a political satire from Lionsgate Television and creator Joshua Michael Stern (with Nick Nolte and Sela Ward toplining the show's cast), about a former American president seeking to repair the damage caused by his administration, and Berlin Station, an espionage drama produced by Paramount Television, about a CIA agent's quest to uncover an information leak at the agency's Berlin office. The two series made their debuts on October 16, 2016.

The network would expand its series development in May 2016, when Epix ordered a thriller comedy series based on the 1990 book and 1995 film adaptation Get Shorty—with Ray Romano and Chris O'Dowd tapped to headline its cast—to be produced by MGM Television. Subsequently, in January 2017, the network ordered the comedy pilot Picture Paris—a series adaptation of the 2011 short film written by Brad Hall, who was tapped as its showrunner—straight to series; the program would mark the first major television role by Meg Ryan, who was tapped as its star, since her supporting main role in the short-lived 1985 ABC western series Wildside.

=== Sports programming ===
On March 19, 2011, Epix became the third premium cable channel—after HBO and Showtime—to air professional boxing events with the telecast of a heavyweight title fight between Vitali Klitschko and Odlanier Solis, held in Cologne, Germany. In addition to airing on the linear Epix channel, the fight was also streamed live on the channel's website. The fight was the first heavyweight title event to air live on American television since Klitschko's September 2009 match against Chris Arreola (which aired one month prior to Epix's debut), and the first televised heavyweight championship bout since Klitschko's December 2009 match against Kevin Johnson.

Epix also broadcast the Bellator Fighting Championships mixed martial arts tournaments on multiplex channel Epix 2, instead of the primary channel.

Beginning with the National Hockey League's 2014–15 season and concluding until the 2016–17 season, Epix also held the rights to broadcast documentary series leading up to some of the league's major events, starting with the 2015 Winter Classic. This was discontinued for the 2017–18 season, when those series were moved to NBCSN.
