= Starz Encore =

American pay television network

- Current logo used since September 29, 2022
- Type: Pay television network
- Country: United States
- Broadcast area: Worldwide
- Headquarters: Meridian, Colorado

Programming
- Languages: English; Spanish (Starz Encore Español; also as SAP option on all other channels)
- Picture format: 1080i (HDTV) (downscaled to letterboxed 480i for the SDTV feed)
- Timeshift service: Starz Encore timeshift channels (Note: Starz Encore Espanol operates exclusively on an Eastern Time schedule.): Starz Encore (East/West); Starz Encore Action (East/West); Starz Encore Black (East/West); Starz Encore Classic (East/West); Starz Encore Español (East/West); Starz Encore Family (East/West); Starz Encore Suspense (East/West); Starz Encore Westerns (East/West)

Ownership
- Owner: Starz Entertainment Corp.
- Parent: Starz Inc.
- Key people: Jeffrey Hirsch (President/CEO, Starz Inc.); Audrey Lee (EVP/General Counsel, Starz Inc.)
- Sister channels: Starz; MoviePlex

History
- Launched: April 1, 1991; 35 years ago
- Former names: Encore (1991–2016)

Links
- Website: www.starz.com

Availability

Streaming media
- Starz (streaming service): (requires subscription or trial to access content) Available feeds: Starz Encore (East); Starz Encore (West)
- Apple TV Channels: Over-the-top TV (requires subscription or trial to access content): Starz Encore (East)
- Amazon Video Channels: Over-the-top TV (requires subscription or trial to access content) Available feeds: Starz Encore (East/West); Starz Encore Action (East/West); Starz Encore Black (East/West); Starz Encore Classic (East/West); Starz Encore Español (East); Starz Encore Family (East/West); Starz Encore Suspense (East/West); Starz Encore Westerns (East/West)
- The Roku Channel: Over-the-top TV (requires subscription or trial to access content): Starz Encore (East)
- ClaroTV+: Over-the-top TV (requires subscription to access content) Available feeds: Starz Encore (East); Starz Encore Action (East); Starz Encore Black (East); Starz Encore Classic (East)

Starz Encore is an American premium television channel owned by Starz Inc., a subsidiary of Starz Entertainment Corp. (a namesake of the network) and headquartered at the Meridian International Business Center complex in Meridian, Colorado, United States. Launched as Encore on April 1, 1991, its programming features mainly older and recent theatrically released feature films, although some of its multiplex channels also carry acquired television series. It is the sister channel of Starz and MoviePlex.

As of September 2018, Starz Encore's programming was available to approximately 34.026 million U.S. households that had a subscription to a multichannel television provider (30.918 million of which receive Starz Encore's primary channel at minimum). Prior to 2018, Starz Encore outpaced HBO for the largest subscriber reach of any American premium channel. (According to February 2015 Nielsen estimates, Starz Encore had 40.54 million pay subscribers vs. HBO's 35.8 million subscribers.)

Starz Encore has a higher subscriber base than its competitors and sister channels because, although Starz and Starz Encore are often sold together in a singular package, some digital cable, telco and satellite providers offer the Starz Encore multiplex separately from Starz as part of an a la carte tier in which it is packaged with other commercial-free and advertiser-supported film-oriented channels (such as MGM+, FX Movie Channel and LMN). Therefore, Starz Encore subscribers do not necessarily have to subscribe to Starz in order to receive the channel.

== History ==
=== Early focus on 1960s, 1970s and 1980s movies ===
Encore launched at 9:00 p.m. Eastern Time on April 1, 1991, on four cable systems that were operated by Tele-Communications Inc. (both TCI and Liberty Media, both of which jointly owned Encore initially, were controlled by John Malone). The channel debuted with an introduction by founder John Sie, who served as the president of the network from its launch until 1999 and CEO until his retirement in 2004, which was then followed by Encore's first movie telecast, the 1980 comedy film 9 to 5. Encore was the first major American premium channel to debut in almost 11 years, since Cinemax launched on August 1, 1980 – at the time of Encore's launch, Cinemax, HBO, Showtime and The Movie Channel were its only competitors (Encore was the only upstart premium channel that managed to gain any headway with those services; other premium channels that debuted prior to Encore's launch, such as Spotlight and Home Theater Network, were unable to compete with those four channels and would eventually shut down during the prior decade).

Initially, Encore focused on movies released primarily during the 1960s, 1970s and 1980s, with some releases from the 1950s mixed in; the channel was formatted similarly to American Movie Classics at the time, with hosted introductions leading into the movie presentations. Breaks between films on Encore during its early years were quite lively, consisting less of promotions and more of trivia and nostalgia, fitting in with Encore's motto "The Movies of Your Life." The channel even ran an interstitial during breaks within its daytime schedule that informed viewers about programs that were scheduled to air on competing premium channels that evening in prime time. The channel had initially broadcast films from Warner Bros. Pictures (owned by Time Warner, which ironically is the parent company of rival pay services HBO and Cinemax), Columbia Pictures/TriStar Pictures, Orion Pictures, 20th Century Fox, The Samuel Goldwyn Company, Paramount Pictures (which also ironically came under ownership of Showtime and The Movie Channel's then-parent company Viacom in 1994), Turner Entertainment, and MGM/United Artists. The channel was formatted as a "mini-pay" service, available to subscribers for a $1 monthly fee.

TCI initially offered Encore as a negative option, in which customers were required to notify TCI if they declined to subscribe to the channel full-time after an introductory offer, or TCI would automatically add on a $1 charge to their monthly bill, which would have then increased to $4.95 per month by May 1992. The negative option fee led to lawsuits filed against TCI by ten states, eventually causing the company to back away from utilizing the billing method for the channel. Many other cable providers were reluctant to offer Encore in its early years due to concerns that it would cannibalize subscriptions of other premium services. However, Sie positioned the channel as such that would bolster the growth of what had been a lagging pay television industry, as premium channels had been seeing a steady decline in subscribers overall since the late 1980s.

Around the time of its launch, there was some debate as to whether Viacom or TCI originally conceived the idea for Encore; Viacom executives insisted that TCI lifted part of the idea from Viacom-owned Showtime Networks (which would launch a similarly formatted mini-pay service, Flix, in August 1992). In a 1991 interview with Multichannel News, John Sie said that TCI brought up the Encore network concept as a way to revitalize Showtime, either by launching a new tertiary pay service from scratch, or overhauling the format of Showtime sister network The Movie Channel. Incidentally, TCI made a failed bid to acquire a 50% ownership stake in Showtime in 1989. Encore had increased its subscriber base to an estimated 7 million subscribers nationwide by 1996.

On January 1, 1997, Encore launched a new pay service called MoviePlex (originally named "Encore Plex" for its first few months on the air) which replaced a Liberty Media-owned network called INTRO Television, that ran blocks of programming from other cable channels. Until it adopted a separate film schedule on August 1, 2011, MoviePlex originally carried programming blocks from Encore's multiplex channels (which differed from that day's actual schedules for each channel to exclude R-rated movies) on a rotating day-to-day schedule. On June 2, 1997, TCI announced a deal in which it would transfer majority ownership of its Encore Media Group subsidiary to sister company Liberty Media, due in part to the significant profit losses incurred by Starz following that channel's launch – TCI retained a minority 20% ownership interest until its 1999 merger with AT&T Corporation, when Liberty Media assumed full ownership of the Encore Media Group. By May 1998, Encore had a subscriber base of 11.4 million homes with cable or satellite television.

=== Format change with addition of recent movies ===
Final Encore logo used from 2013 to 2016.

As the channel aged, it adopted a more conventional presentation style: first in 1998, Encore began to carry two exclusive first-run feature film broadcasts each month, then Encore shifted its focus to hit movies as part of a major rebrand of the channel on May 24, 1999, primarily incorporating recent films, but with notable classics mixed in as well. By this point, Encore advertised itself as guaranteeing to air "a great movie every night", even setting up a special 1-800 number in which a $2.50 refund would be given to unsatisfied subscribers.

Encore eventually began to be sold as a hybrid service, offered as either a premium channel or a digital basic network depending on the provider, retaining the uncut and commercial-free nature of its programming. Through this change in distribution, the channel was eventually available in 25 million homes nationwide by September 2005. On November 19, 2009, Liberty Media spun off Starz and Encore into a separate public tracking stock called Liberty Starz. On August 8, 2012, Liberty Media announced that it would spin off Liberty Starz into its own separate, publicly traded company. The spin-off of the subsidiary was completed on January 11, 2013, with Liberty Starz changing its name to Starz Inc. as a result.

On April 5, 2016, Encore and its other multiplex channels were rebranded as Starz Encore, unifying the network under the brand umbrella of the channel that Encore ironically spun off in September 1994. With the rebranding, Starz Encore also began to carry reruns of Starz original comedy and drama series within its schedule.

Starz Encore logo used from April 5, 2016, to September 28, 2022.

On June 30, 2016, Lionsgate agreed to acquire Starz Inc. for $4.4 billion in cash and stock; the acquisition was completed five months later on December 8.

== Channels ==
=== List of channels ===
Depending on the service provider, Starz Encore provides up to thirteen multiplex channels – eight 24-hour multiplex channels, five of which are simulcast in both standard definition and high definition – as well as a subscription video-on-demand service (Starz Encore On Demand).

Starz Encore broadcasts its primary and multiplex channels on both Eastern and Pacific Time Zone schedules. The respective coastal feeds of each channel are usually packaged together (though most cable providers only offer the east and west coast feeds of the main Starz Encore channel), resulting in the difference in local airtimes for a particular movie or program between two geographic locations being three hours at most.

Channel	Description and programming
Starz Encore	The main "flagship" feed; Starz Encore features movies from the 1970s to the present day including blockbuster movies, first-run films and some anime films.
Starz Encore Classic	Starz Encore Classic features a broad mix of classic movies along with some off-network television series from the 1970s to the 1990s; due to its carriage of the latter, it is one of only four Encore channels that currently airs series programming (consisting of sitcoms and drama series that air during the morning and primetime hours). The channel originally launched on July 1, 1994, as Love Stories, and focused on romantic comedy and drama films; it was renamed Encore Love on March 25, 2005. Encore Love was reformatted under its current name and format on December 2, 2013.
Starz Encore Action	Starz Encore Action focuses on action movies, martial arts films and horror movies; it also previously carried anime feature films (most with more intense violent content than those currently seen on Encore Family) until 2008. Starz Encore Action was originally called simply Action from 1994 to 2005.
Starz Encore Suspense	Starz Encore Suspense features mystery and suspense films as well as detective movies and series, film noir and neo noir. It is one of only four Encore channels that currently airs series programming (consisting of mystery series that air during the late evening hours). The channel, which has maintained the same format since its launch, was originally called Mystery from 1994 to 2005 and was later renamed Encore Mystery from 2005 to 2011.
Starz Encore Family	Starz Encore Family features live action, animated and anime films targeted at family audiences. Films broadcast on the channel are primarily rated G or PG (or the equivalent TV-Y, TV-G, TV-Y7 and TV-PG), although Encore Family does run select films with a rating of PG-13 or TV-14. Prior to its original launch on September 12, 1994, the channel had the working title Tweens, before its name was changed to WAM! America's Youth Network (later called WAM! America's Kidz Network from 1997 to 2005 and then Encore Wam from 2005 to 2011) prior to its launch; the "WAM!" name was chosen through a naming contest, serving as an acronym for "What Adults are Missing". As WAM!/Encore Wam until 2008, the channel also ran imported series aimed at children and teenagers during the daytime hours.
Starz Encore Westerns	Starz Encore Westerns features a mix of classic and contemporary western movies, as well as reruns of popular western series from the 1950s to the 1970s. It is one of only four Encore channels that currently airs series programming (consisting of classic western series thar air during the morning and late afternoon hours). The channel was originally called Westerns from 1994 to 2005.
Starz Encore Black	Starz Encore Black features movies, and off-network comedy and drama television series aimed at African American audiences; due to its carriage of the latter, it is one of only four Starz Encore channels that currently airs series programming (consisting of sitcoms that air during primetime hours). The channel originally launched on September 12, 1994, as True Stories & Drama, focusing on movies based on historical events, biographical pictures and other dramatic films; in 1997, its name was shortened to True Stories, before rebranding as Encore Drama on March 25, 2005. Encore Drama was relaunched under its current name and format on December 2, 2013.
Starz Encore Español	Starz Encore Español focuses on imported and domestic Spanish language feature films. When the channel launched on August 1, 2011, it originated as a Spanish simulcast of the main Encore channel, before adopting its own separate schedule on December 1, 2013.

==== Background ====
On February 1, 1994, Encore launched the pay television industry's first "themed" multiplex – seven additional channels that each focused on a specific genre. This was initially going to be composed of six channels, but Encore decided to launch its own competitor to HBO and Showtime, called Starz!, after a May 1993 deal in which it acquired the pay television rights to run Universal Studios films released after that year. Starz was the first of the multiplex channels to launch, debuting on February 1, 1994. Three additional multiplex channels launched five months later on July 1, 1994: Love Stories, Mystery, and Westerns; these were followed on September 12, 1994, by the launch of the final three channels: True Stories & Drama (later shortened to True Stories), Action and WAM!: America's Youth Network (later known as WAM!: America's Kidz Network; it also went under the preliminary names Arcade and Tweens prior to the launch of the multiplex).

Encore initially utilized a numbering system for each multiplex channel: Love Stories was designated as "Encore 2", Westerns was "Encore 3", Mystery was "Encore 4", Action was "Encore 5", True Stories was "Encore 6", WAM! was "Encore 7" and Starz! was designated "Encore 8". Encore eventually abandoned the numbering system for most of its channels in 1996, instead using the tagline "an encore network" from then on until the early 2002, in contrast, Starz! continued to use the "Encore 8" branding in its main IDs and feature presentation bumpers until 2002, even though that service had been long since separated entirely from the Encore brand by that time, and was given its own slate of multiplex channels.

The entire multiplex was rebranded to bring the individual channels back in line with the overall Encore brand on March 28, 2005, due to focus tests that revealed that viewers did not know the themed channels were directly related to the service's main channel. All of the multiplex channels had the "Encore" brand incorporated into the names of each channel, though three of the Encore multiplex channels underwent more extensive name changes: True Stories rebranded as Encore Drama, Love Stories became Encore Love and WAM!: America's Kidz Network became simply Encore Wam. Additional changes to the Encore multiplex came on August 1, 2011, with the launch of a Spanish-language simulcast of Encore's primary channel called Encore Español, and the respective rebrands and refocusings of Encore Mystery and the teen-targeted Encore Wam into Encore Suspense and Encore Family (the latter channel adopting a format similar to that of sister service Starz Kids & Family), Encore Westerns and Encore Action became the only Encore multiplex channels to retain the naming schemes that were in use since the multiplex's original 1994 launch (prior to the incorporation of the "Encore" name in the branding of the multiplex channels).

Three of the Encore channels (two of them being among the channel's six original multiplex services) underwent changes in their programming formats on December 2, 2013, as part of an extensive rebranding of the Encore multiplex. Encore Drama relaunched as Encore Black (adopting the same target audience demographic – African Americans – as sister channel Starz's multiplex service Starz In Black) and Encore Love was reformatted as Encore Classic (focusing primarily on classic feature films), both channels began incorporating reruns of network television series from the 1970s to the 1990s as part of specialized program blocks alongside feature films from that period. In addition, Encore Español, which originally sought carriage alongside the other multiplex channels, began to be made available as part of the Spanish-language channel tiers offered by most cable and satellite providers and adopted an independent schedule of Spanish-language feature films.

The multiplex has been given several collective brand names over the years, including the "Encore Multiplex", "Encore Movie Networks", "Starz Encore Super Pak", and "Starz Super Pak". As of 2014, the multiplex currently has no "official" marketed name, and viewers are simply told they are watching "one of the seven Encore channels", though some providers collectively brand the channels as the "Encore Movie Pak", while Dish Network uses the "Starz Moviepack" as an unofficial name for the entire collection of Starz and Encore channels and select other providers (such as DirecTV) continue to brand the channels as the "Starz Super Pak".

=== Starz Encore HD ===
Starz Encore HD is a high definition simulcast feed of Starz Encore that broadcasts in the 1080i resolution format. The main Encore channel originally launched its HD simulcast feed on March 22, 2004; it was shut down after the channel's March 2005 rebrand. The current incarnation of the HD simulcast feed was launched in July 2008. The main Encore HD simulcast is currently carried nationally by all major cable and satellite providers. Encore Action and Encore Drama (now Starz Encore Black) began broadcasting in high definition on August 1, 2011, while Encore Classic and Encore Suspense began their own HD simulcasts on December 2, 2013. Starz Encore Family and Starz Encore Espanol launched their HD simulcasts in October 2018, while Starz Encore Westerns launched its HD simulcast a month later.

=== Other services ===
==== Starz Encore On Demand ====
Starz Encore operates a subscription video-on-demand television service called Starz Encore On Demand, which is available at no additional charge to new and existing Starz Encore subscribers. Starz Encore On Demand offers program content available in standard or high definition, consisting of theatrically released feature films and original programs, to most cable and satellite providers. The service's rotating program selection incorporates select new titles that are added each Friday, alongside existing program titles held over from the previous one to two weeks.

==== Encore Play ====
Encore Play was a website and mobile app that featured original programming and feature film content from Encore available for streaming in standard or high definition. It was available to Encore subscribers of Verizon FIOS, AT&T U-verse, Cox Communications, Xfinity by Comcast and DirecTV until it was merged with Starz.com on April 5, 2016.

The Encore Play iPad, iPhone and iPod Touch app was first released on October 8, 2012, followed by the release of the app for Android devices on May 7, 2013; an app for the Xbox 360 was released on December 3, 2013 (available for no extra charge to Xbox Live Gold members) and on the Xbox One on August 5, 2014. The Encore Play service, as well as Movieplex's TVEverywhere service Movieplex Play were merged into Starz's streaming app and website on April 5, 2016.

==== Amazon Prime ====
From winter of 2015 to April 5, 2016, Encore's east coast linear feed along with much of its movie and TV series catalog had been offered as part of Starz's add-on subscription service, through Amazon Prime The cost was $8.99 per month (after a seven-day free trial) for Amazon Prime subscribers to access the Starz/Encore catalog and live feeds.

== Programming ==
=== Movie library ===
As of 2023, Encore – through Starz – maintains exclusive first-run film licensing agreements with Lionsgate Films (since 2022, including Summit Entertainment since 2023) and Universal Pictures (since 2022, after each films' 18 month window on Peacock and Prime Video)

On March 2, 2021, Lionsgate announced films from Lionsgate Films will air on Starz for first-run rights starting in 2022, except Summit Entertainment which will start airing on Starz in 2023 after output deals with Hulu and HBO expire at the end of 2021 and 2022 respectively. On July 15, 2021, Starz reached a licensing deal with Universal Pictures for first-run movies 18 months after they stream on Peacock and Prime Video respectively.

Despite being acquired by Lions Gate Entertainment in 2016, films released under the Lionsgate label did not air on Starz until 2022 due to an output deal with Epix until the end of 2019, then Hulu until the end of 2021. Summit Entertainment films did not air on Starz until 2023 due to an output deal with HBO until the end of 2022.

Encore also shows sub-runs (runs of films that have recently received broadcast or syndicated television airings) of theatrical films from Walt Disney Studios Motion Pictures (including subsidiaries Walt Disney Pictures, Touchstone Pictures, Marvel Studios, Lucasfilm, 20th Century Studios, and Hollywood Pictures - all for films released before 2016), Warren Miller Films (for films released before 2020), Sony Pictures Entertainment (including subsidiaries Columbia Pictures, Sony Pictures Classics, Screen Gems, Destination Films, Triumph Films, and TriStar Pictures - all for films released before 2022), Warner Bros. Discovery (including content from subsidiaries Warner Bros. Pictures, New Line Cinema, Turner Entertainment – both for films released prior to 2005 – and Castle Rock Entertainment), Amazon MGM Studios (including content from subsidiaries United Artists, Orion Pictures, and The Samuel Goldwyn Company), Europa Corp, Paramount Pictures (including content from DreamWorks Pictures (pre-2011), Republic Pictures, Nickelodeon Movies, Dimension Films (pre-2005), Miramax, Paramount Vantage and television rights to the Cannon Films and Carolco Pictures libraries), Revolution Studios, Overture Films, Yari Film Group, and the network's sister company Lions Gate Entertainment (since 2012).

In January 1997, Encore secured a licensing agreement with Paramount Pictures, broadcasting over 300 titles; Paramount's first contract with Encore expired in December 2005. In March 2013, Encore reassumed sub-run rights to Paramount Pictures' feature film releases. The first film broadcast through this deal was Primal Fear. Additional Paramount Pictures releases were broadcast the following month on Encore, such as Racing with the Moon, She's Having a Baby and Black Rain. In April 2013, Encore acquired sub-run rights to feature films from DreamWorks Pictures. The first film broadcast through this deal was In Dreams.

Encore generally airs older films released between the 1960s to the 1990s, with some newer movie titles (usually broadcast between six and nine months after their premiere on Starz) interspersed throughout the day (mostly on Sunday nights, as of the summer of 2014). The newly released films (previous aired on Starz) premiered on Sunday nights.

==== Former first-run contracts ====
During the 1990s, Encore (through Starz) had exclusive first-run movie rights with Universal Pictures, Touchstone Pictures, Hollywood Pictures, Miramax Films, New Line Cinema and Carolco Pictures. Between 1995 and 2005, Encore broadcast films from Turner Pictures and New Line Cinema. Encore's contract with Universal Pictures expired in late 2002; HBO and Starz shared half of Universal's films in 2003 before HBO assumed pay television rights the following year.

In 1997, Encore lost its rights to many of the Dimension Films to Showtime, due to its violent content surrounding the films, except for several future Jackie Chan films Dimension Films released, which Encore kept the rights. After the Showtime deal, in August 1999, Encore preemptively signed a four-year deal with Dimension Films that took effect in January 2003, in conjunction with a four-year extension of its existing deal with Miramax Films and the rest of the Disney family. In 2002, Encore picked up the pay television rights to Disney's animated films, which previously bypassed a pay television window.

The first-run film output agreement with Walt Disney Studios Motion Pictures expired after December 2015, with Netflix assuming pay television rights in January 2016 (excluding films released by Touchstone Pictures, which were retained by Starz through a separate contract). Through at least the first half of 2016, Starz provided Disney films that were released before the expiration, such as Inside Out and The Good Dinosaur, but none released after, such as Zootopia.

The first-run film output agreement with Sony was renewed for nine years on February 11, 2013, and expired at the end of 2021. On April 8, 2021, Sony announced that they would not be renewing the agreement with Starz in favor of a new first-run agreement with Netflix.

The Warren Miller output deal was renewed for 10 years on October 19, 2009.

=== Original programming ===
Encore aired its first ever slate of original programming in 2011: the miniseries Moby Dick and The Take, and the biographical documentary Method to the Madness of Jerry Lewis. The following year, Encore broadcast Thorne in June 2012.

==== Programming block ====
The Big Miniseries Showcase (originally airing on weeknights, and later seen only on Sunday mornings) is a former weekly programming block that showcased a mix of classic and recent critically acclaimed miniseries. As part of this block, Encore broadcast original miniseries such as The Crimson Petal and the White, Titanic: Blood and Steel, Moby Dick, Thorne (both of which were already broadcast previously) and Hindenburg: The Last Flight. In addition to showcasing original miniseries, Encore has also aired older miniseries previously seen on network television such as The Thorn Birds, North and South, Shōgun, Jason and the Argonauts and Gulliver's Travels. The block was discontinued on December 29, 2013.

==== Acquired programming ====
Despite being a premium service, Encore has incorporated acquired programming on several of its multiplex channels. Originally, these were limited to Encore Westerns and Encore Family (as WAM!/Encore Wam), consisting of classic western series from the 1950s to the 1970s on the former, and imported series aimed at children and teenagers on the latter channel (after Encore Wam stopped carrying acquired programming in 2009, sister channel Starz Kids & Family later incorporated some series programming onto its schedule that are aimed at the same target audience as those that were carried by Wam).

Currently, Starz Encore Westerns carries the classic western series Bonanza, Gunsmoke and Have Gun – Will Travel. Just prior to its rebranding as Encore Suspense, Encore Mystery eventually added acquired mystery series to its schedule (such as The Alfred Hitchcock Hour). With the 2013 rebranding and refocusing of what had been Encore Drama and Encore Love as Encore Black and Encore Classic, both channels added series fitting their respective formats in weekdaily blocks. Encore Black currently carries the classic African American sitcoms What's Happening!!, Amen, Diff'rent Strokes and 227; while Encore Classic airs the classic sitcoms Murphy Brown and Night Court; and crime dramas Magnum, P.I. and The A-Team. Encore Black began airing The Jeffersons, Sanford and Son, and Good Times on December 1, 2015. Starz Encore Family airs classic animated children's shows such as Garfield and Friends and various ex-DIC Entertainment shows like Heathcliff, Inspector Gadget, Liberty's Kids, and Adventures of Sonic the Hedgehog until November 30, 2020.

== Branding ==
Throughout the network's history, Encore's logo has included a starburst mark. In the original logo used from 1991 to 1994, the starburst appeared within the "O" in the channel's name, which was rendered in uppercase and similar in design to sister network Starz's 2008 logo design – the mark was then revamped into a box design in 1994. The logo was simplified for the 1999 rebrand, removing the box design and turning the starburst into a line artwork above the "encore" logotype; the basic design was carried over in the 2005 revamp. On December 1, 2013, Encore introduced a new text-only logo, dropping the starburst mark included in its branding since its launch. In accordance with the rebrand, feature presentation bumpers were dropped across the Encore channels, with programs prefaced only by a graphic informing viewers of the program airing next.

=== Network slogans ===
- Hit Movies of the '60s, '70s, and '80s (1991–1994)
- The Movies of Your Life (1991–1999)
- The Greatest Movies of Yesterday and Today (1994–1999)
- A Great Movie Every Night, Guaranteed (1999–2004)
- The Place For Movies, 24 Hours a Day (2004–2010)
- Playing Favorites (2010–present, primary slogan since 2013)
- The New Encore (secondary slogan, 2013–2014)
- Encore: So Classic, It's Original (secondary slogan, 2014–present)
