= Starz =

American pay television network

STARZ
- Current logo used since September 29, 2022
- Type: Pay television network; OTT platform
- Country: United States
- Broadcast area: Worldwide
- Headquarters: Santa Monica, California

Programming
- Languages: English; Spanish (as SAP option)
- Picture format: 480i (SDTV); 1080i (HDTV)
- Timeshift service: Starz timeshift channels: Starz (East / West); Starz Cinema (East / West); Starz Comedy (East / West); Starz Edge (East / West); Starz Kids & Family (East / West); Starz In Black (East / West)

Ownership
- Owner: Starz Entertainment
- Parent: Starz Inc.
- Key people: Jeffrey Hirsch (President/CEO); Audrey Lee (EVP/General Counsel); Kathryn Busby (President, Original Programming)
- Sister channels: Starz Encore; MoviePlex

History
- Launched: February 1, 1994; 32 years ago
- Former names: Starz! (1994–2005)

Links
- Website: www.starz.com

Availability

Streaming media
- Starz (streaming service): (American cable internet subscribers only; requires subscription, trial or television provider login to access content) Available feeds: Starz (East); Starz (West)
- Apple TV Channels: Over-the-top TV (requires subscription or trial to access content): Starz (East)
- Amazon Video Channels: Over-the-top TV (requires subscription or trial to access content) Available feeds: Starz (East); Starz Cinema (East); Starz Comedy (East); Starz Edge (East); Starz Kids & Family (East); Starz In Black (East)
- The Roku Channel: Over-the-top TV (requires subscription or trial to access content): Starz (East)
- ClaroTV+: Over-the-top TV (requires subscription to access content) Available feeds: Starz (East); Starz In Black (East); Starz Kids & Family (East); Starz Cinema (East); Starz Edge (East); Starz Comedy (East); Starz Encore (East); Starz Encore Action (East); Starz Encore Black (East); Starz Encore Classic (East)

Starz (stylized in all caps as STARZ; pronounced "stars") is an American pay-TV network owned by Starz Entertainment, and is the flagship property of Starz Inc. Launched on February 1, 1994, as a multiplex service of what is now Starz Encore, its programming consists of theatrically released motion pictures and first-run original television series. Starz operates six 24-hour, linear multiplex channels; a traditional subscription video on demand service; and a namesake over-the-top streaming platform that both acts as a TV Everywhere offering for Starz's linear television subscribers and is sold directly to streaming-only consumers.

Starz is also sold independently of traditional and over-the-top multichannel video programming distributors a la carte through Apple TV Channels and Amazon Video Channels, which feature VOD library content and live feeds of Starz's linear television services (consisting of the primary channel's East and West Coast feeds and, for Amazon Video customers, the East Coast feeds of its five multiplex channels). Starz's programming has been licensed for use by a number of channels and platforms worldwide, and the brand name is licensed by Bell Media for a companion channel of the Canada-based company's Crave premium service.

Starz and its sibling networks, the aforementioned Starz Encore and MoviePlex, are headquartered in Santa Monica, California, with satellite office facilities located at the Meridian International Business Center complex in Englewood, Colorado, and at a small office located on 5th Avenue in New York City. As of September 2018, Starz was available to approximately 28.517 million American households that had a subscription to a multichannel television provider (27.675 million of which receive Starz's primary channel at minimum). Starz's video on demand streaming media service had 27.92 million paid subscribers as of 2024.

== History ==
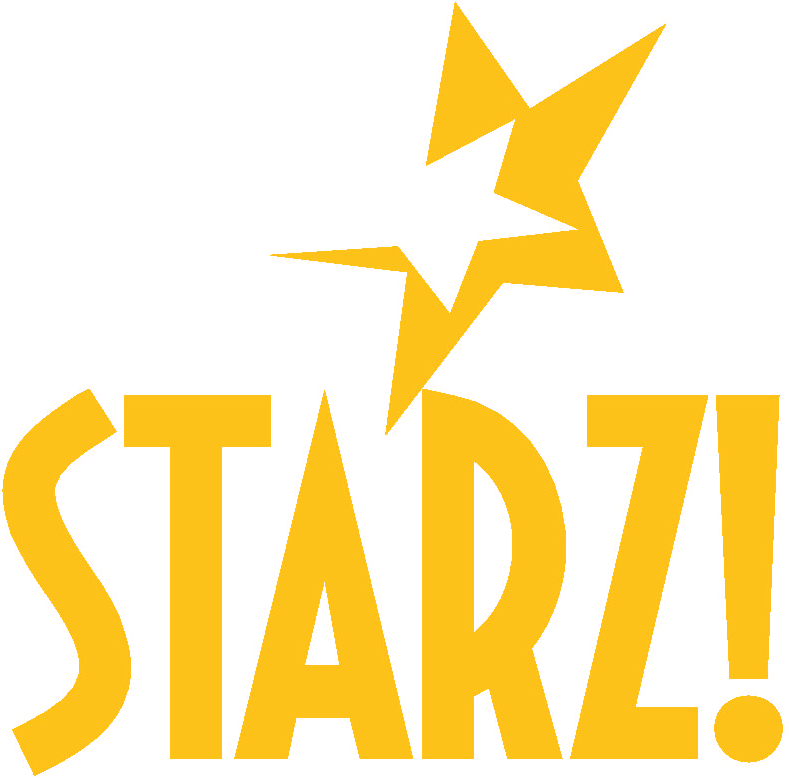
Logo used from February 1, 1994, to March 28, 2005

=== Launch and early history ===
Starz (initially stylized as "STARZ!" with an exclamation point) was launched at 8:00 p.m. Eastern Time on February 1, 1994, primarily on cable systems operated by Tele-Communications Inc.; the first two movies aired on the network were dramas released in 1992: respectively, Scent of a Woman and The Crying Game. The network was operated as a joint venture between TCI and Liberty Media (both companies were controlled by John Malone), with TCI owning a 50.1% controlling interest in the channel.

Starz made its debut as the first phase of a seven-channel thematic multiplex that was launched by Starz (then Encore Media Group) over the course of the succeeding eight months, with the remaining six channels being launched between July and September 1994. The multiplex was intended to only include six channels, but on May 31, 1993, Encore acquired the pay cable rights to broadcast recent feature films from Universal Pictures released after that year; as a result, TCI/Liberty decided to create an additional premium pay-TV service to serve as a competitor to HBO (owned by Time Warner) and Showtime (owned by Viacom). The network carried the moniker "Encore 8" in its on-air branding as part of a numbering system that was used by Encore's multiplex channels. Early trademark filings indicated that TCI/Liberty's proposed names including "Applause" and "Stars" for the service (the "s" in the latter was ultimately changed to a "z" in the final-cut naming).

Starz focused more on recent feature films, while Starz Encore (then Encore) focused on films released between the 1960s and the 1980s, before adding recent film outlay itself in July 1999. It also held the television rights to releases from Carolco Pictures. Universal Pictures, New Line Cinema (as well as its sub-divisions Fine Line Features and Turner Pictures), and the Disney–owned studios Touchstone Pictures, Hollywood Pictures and Miramax Films. Films from those studios were not carried on Starz until 1997, after Disney's output agreement with Showtime for its non-family-oriented films concluded. The network restricted the scheduling of films that contained graphic sexual or violent content to late evening and overnight time periods.

Starz's availability was mainly limited to TCI's systems at launch, debuting with a one-month free preview available to prospective subscribers; it would eventually sign its first major carriage agreement outside the TCI group, through a deal with Continental Cablevision in September 1995. Starz was available to an estimated 2.8 million pay television subscribers by 1996, only one million of whom had subscribed to a cable or satellite provider other than TCI. As a startup network, Starz endured major losses during its early years, with total deficits topping US$203 million and annual losses of US$150 million by 1997. It was predicted to lose an additional US$300 million in revenue before it was predicted to break even.

In June 1997, Comcast signed an agreement to carry the network on its Pennsylvania and New Jersey systems to replace Philadelphia-based PRISM after that network shut down that October following the loss of its (and spinoff network SportsChannel Philadelphia's) sports programming to Comcast SportsNet Philadelphia. Partly in an effort to get the network's substantial losses off its books, TCI announced a deal on June 2, 1997, in which it transferred majority ownership of the corporate entity that operated Starz, Encore Media Group, to sister company Liberty Media; TCI retained a 20% minority ownership interest in Encore Media Group. Liberty Media assumed the former company's stake in the subsidiary in 1999, following TCI's merger with AT&T Corporation. By May 1998, Starz maintained a subscriber base reaching 7.6 million households with a cable or satellite television subscription.

=== 2000s onwards ===
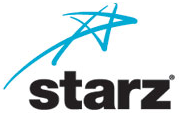
Starz logo used from March 28, 2005, to April 7, 2008

The network gained carriage deals with many other major American cable and satellite providers by the early 2000s, particularly with the adoption of digital cable, allowing for providers to add channels that they (even with capacity expansions of up to 60 channels) previously had limited room to carry. Encore Media Group was renamed the Starz Encore Media Group in 1999. As part of a corporate restructuring plan in 2003, Starz Encore Group eliminated 100 jobs in its nine regional offices, and closed four of the offices outright. On March 25, 2005, the Starz Encore Group corporate entity was renamed Starz Entertainment. A few days later, on March 28, 2005 at 6:30am EST, Starz introduced a new logo, and was subsequently rebranded as "starz", in all lowercase.

Starz logo used from April 7, 2008, to April 5, 2016

On November 19, 2009, Liberty Media spun off Starz into a separate public tracking stock called Liberty Starz. On January 1, 2010, Chris Albrecht joined Starz as its president and chief executive officer, then overseeing all of the Starz entities including Starz Entertainment, Overture Films, Anchor Bay Entertainment and Film Roman. On August 8, 2012, Liberty Media announced that it would spin off the Liberty Starz subsidiary into a separate publicly traded company. The spin-off of the subsidiary was completed on January 11, 2013, with Liberty Starz changing its name to Starz as a result.

Starz logo used from April 5, 2016, to September 29, 2022

On April 5, 2016, Starz was rebranded, introducing a new logo, this time stylized as "STARZ" in all uppercase without any references to a star everywhere. As part of the rebranding, Starz added all the Encore channels to its moniker, therefore increasing the Starz channel lineup to 14 Starz premium channels. Its main channel was rebranded Starz Encore and carries reruns of Starz Originals in addition to films. On June 30, 2016, Lionsgate agreed to acquire Starz Inc. for $4.4 billion in cash and stock; the acquisition was completed five months later on December 8.

In April 2019, Starz was widely criticized in the tech press and by the Electronic Frontier Foundation for sending legal demands to Twitter in order to remove links to a news article which discussed piracy but contained neither pirated content nor links to pirated content. Starz initially responded by issuing further DMCA complaints against those criticizing them, including against a tweet from the Electronic Frontier Foundation stating that "Starz should withdraw its takedown and refrain from harassing journalists". However, they subsequently apologized, clarified that the invalid DMCA claims were sent on their behalf by a third-party contractor called The Social Element and promised that they are "working with our vendors to reinstate any such content that was inappropriately targeted for removal." Lionsgate was renamed Starz Entertainment in 2024, 6 months after spinning off most of their businesses into a new company known as Lionsgate Studios.

== Channels ==
=== List of channels ===
Depending on the service provider, Starz provides up to twelve multiplex channels – six 24-hour multiplex channels, all of which are simulcast in both standard definition and high definition – as well as a subscription video-on-demand service (Starz On Demand). Starz broadcasts its primary and multiplex channels on Eastern and Pacific Time Zone schedules. The respective coastal feeds of each channel are usually packaged together (though most cable providers only offer the East and West Coast feeds of the main Starz channel), resulting in the difference in local airtimes for a particular movie or program between two geographic locations being three hours at most.

The premium film services Encore and MoviePlex, which are also owned by Starz, Inc., operate as separate services; as such, subscribers to one of the services do not have to subscribe to any of the others. Some providers offer Encore and MoviePlex's multiplex channels on a separate digital cable tier from Starz. However, Encore and, depending on its carriage, MoviePlex are frequently sold together in a package with Starz.

| Channel | Description and programming |
|---|---|
| Starz | The flagship service; Starz features hit movies and first-run films, from Hollywood blockbusters to independent films and international cinema. The main Starz channel commonly premieres recent theatrically released hit movies – debuting on the channel within a lag of between eight months to one year on average from their initial theatrical release – on most Friday nights at 9:00 p.m. Eastern Time, as part of a weekly feature film block called the "Starz Friday Night Feature Premiere" (originally airing on Saturday nights until 2013, and known as "Starz Saturday Opening Night" until 2002 and "Starz Saturday Premiere" from 2002 to 2013). The channel also airs some original series, with newer episodes airing primarily on Saturday nights. |
| Starz Edge | Starz Edge features films aimed at young adults in the 18–34 age demographic. It was launched in March 1996 as Starz! 2, and was rebranded as Starz! Theater from July 1999 until March 25, 2005; in its previous incarnations, the channel's format incorporated a limited selection of films scheduled in a format mirroring the showtime scheduling used by movie theaters. |
| Starz In Black | Starz In Black focuses on AfrAm cinema and urban entertainment, carrying a mix of first-run hits, vintage and Pan-African films, along original productions. Launched in 1997 as a joint venture with BET, Starz In Black was known as BET Movies: Starz! (3) until 2001, when BET opted out of the venture during its purchase by Viacom (then-owner of rival premium service Showtime). It was then named Black Starz! from 2001 to 2005. |
| Starz Cinema | Starz Cinema carries films outside the mainstream cinema, incorporating critically acclaimed studio and independent releases, and arthouse films; Starz Cinema was launched in May 1999. |
| Starz Comedy | Starz Comedy focuses on lighthearted films of varying comedic genres including slapstick, romantic comedies and dramedies. It was launched in 2005. |
| Starz Kids & Family | Launched on March 25, 2005, out of the consolidation of the once separate services Starz! Family (which was launched in May 1999) and Starz! Kids (which launched over the channel space now occupied by Starz Comedy in 2003), Starz Kids & Family features commercial-free family movies – including action and adventure movies, dramas and comedies. The channel featured two program blocks: "Building Blocks", a weekday morning block of animated series (primarily imported from Canada) and "Six Block", a weekday afternoon block of imported live-action series aimed at a youth audience. Unlike Starz Encore Family (which replaced Encore Wam in August 2011), Starz Kids & Family features some PG-13 rated films within its schedule, in addition to G- and PG-rated films. Due to its family-targeted format, the network broadcasts without R nor NC-17 rated movies and TV-14 nor TV-MA rated programming, only showing programs that are rated G, PG or PG-13 (or the equivalent TV-Y, TV-G, TV-Y7 or TV-PG). Despite being a premium service, cable providers have occasionally used Starz Kids & Family (and its predecessor, Starz Family) to temporarily replace television stations dropped due to carriage disputes such as during Journal Broadcast Group's 2013 dispute with Time Warner Cable. This dispute resulted in TWC's systems in certain markets substituting other stations (such as the Local AccuWeather Channel- and Live Well Network-affiliated digital subchannels of Milwaukee, Wisconsin's WTMJ-TV) with the channel. A January 2000 dispute between Cox Communications and Fox Television Stations resulted in Starz! Family replacing Fox owned-and-operated stations in six markets. In September 2016, the channel brought back children's programming on a weekday morning block. The block provided programming from Nelvana, WildBrain (mainly programs from the DIC Entertainment and Cookie Jar Group catalogs) and The Jim Henson Company. Programs included Angela Anaconda, Sonic the Hedgehog, Liberty's Kids, Muppet Babies, The Wubbulous World of Dr. Seuss, The Cat in the Hat Knows a Lot About That!, etc. Other WildBrain programs aired on Starz Encore Family, and all the others appeared on the Starz streaming mobile app. This block was removed for reruns of another show Starz acquired, Pit Pony, in December 2020, though reruns of Little Charmers stayed until December 2022. |

==== Background ====
In 1994, Encore launched the pay television industry's first "themed" multiplex service – seven additional movie channels that each focused on a specific genre. This was intended to include only six channels, but Encore decided to launch Starz as a competitor to Warner's HBO and Viacom's Showtime after it acquired the pay-TV rights to broadcast films by Universal Studios released after 1993. A numbering system was used for each service to identify itself as an Encore channel, though this system was abandoned for most of the channels in 1996, with the tagline "an encore network" (which Starz! also used, albeit sparingly) being used from then until 2002. Starz continued to heavily include the "Encore 8" moniker in its main IDs, "Feature Presentation" bumpers and select bumpers until 2002, even as it transitioned into a separate channel from Encore.

The tie to Encore branding-wise continued even as Starz was given its own slate of multiplex channels in the late 1990s. The first of these to debut was Starz! 2 in 1996, maintaining a set lineup of four different movies scheduled at the same times each day (inspired by the scheduling used by movie theaters) with the slate of films changing each Friday. This was followed in 1997 by the debut of a joint venture with BET Networks called BET Movies: Starz! 3. Two additional multiplex channels began operations in May 1999. Starz! Family carried family-oriented theatrical and home video film releases, was launched possibly in response to HBO's own family-oriented multiplex channel, HBO Family, which launched three years earlier, but closed down in Summer 2025. The other service was Starz! Cinema, a channel featuring critically acclaimed independent films and movies outside the mainstream cinema. Starz! 2 was also renamed Starz! Theater to better reflect its format.

The first changes made following the original rollout of the multiplex occurred in 2001, with the rebranding of BET Movies: Starz! as Black Starz! after BET withdrew from the partnership during its acquisition by Viacom (which owned rival pay-TV service Showtime at the time) in 2001. A seventh Starz multiplex channel was launched in 2004: Starz! Kids was created as a movie service featuring films aimed at children between 2 and 11 years of age, maintaining a format similar to that of Starz! Family. Unlike the other Starz multiplex channels, Starz! Kids was launched on cable systems on a case-by-case basis instead of on a broader national scale.

The entire multiplex was overhauled on March 28, 2005, as part of an extensive rebranding of the Starz and Encore services. While Encore debuted a slightly modified logo and applied the "Encore" brand to the names of its six multiplex channels, Starz underwent a more dramatic makeover, with a completely redesigned logo – which included the exclamation mark being dropped from the channel's name – and a standardized graphics package that was implemented across all of its channels (with some modifications for each channel's format). The programming formats of several channels changed entirely: Starz! Theater was relaunched as Starz Edge, a movie channel aimed primarily at men 18 to 34 years old (nicknamed "The New Generation" by the channel). Starz! Kids and Starz! Family were combined into a single channel called Starz Kids and Family, to make room for a new channel focusing on comedic feature films called Starz Comedy. Black Starz! also changed its name to Starz InBlack. The only multiplex channel (other than the primary feed) that retained its original name was Starz Cinema.

The Starz multiplex has been marketed under several names over the years including the "Starz Encore Super Pak" and the "Starz Super Pak". The multiplex now has no "official" marketed name as of 2015.

On March 28, 2016, Starz introduced a new logo and tagline, "Obsessable". This coincided with a revamp of the Starz channels effective April 5 of that year, with all of Encore's channels taking on the "Starz" brand, and Encore's main channel being rebranded "Starz Encore", and airing reruns of Starz originals in addition to films. Starz now has 14 channels in its package.

=== Other services ===
==== Starz HD ====
Starz HD logo in 2010

Starz HD is a high-definition simulcast feed of Starz that broadcasts in the 1080i resolution format. In addition to its main channel, Starz also operates high-definition simulcast feeds of its five multiplex channels. When it was launched in December 2003, the simulcast covered only the East and West Coast feeds of the main Starz channel. An enhanced-definition simulcast feed and a separate HD channel called Sharper Movies HD, that would have broadcast in the 1080i format and be structured similarly to the original format of sister channel Encore's MoviePlex (in which Sharper Movies would broadcast programming from each Starz channel in daily sampler blocks), were also planned. Plans for the latter service were dropped because of a lack of interest from providers to charge a premium fee for the network. HD feeds of Starz Kids and Family, Starz Comedy and Starz Edge, followed in 2007.

The remaining Starz multiplex channels, Starz Cinema and Starz In Black, launched their HD simulcast feeds on June 23, 2010, with DirecTV becoming the first provider to offer all six channels (including both coastal feeds of the primary Starz channel) in HD. Among others, Starz HD is carried nationally by satellite providers: DirecTV and Dish Network and regionally by digital cable: Verizon FiOS, AT&T U-verse, Comcast Xfinity, Time Warner Cable, Cox Communications, Cablevision and Charter Communications.

==== Starz On Demand ====
Starz operates a video-on-demand (VOD) television service called Starz On Demand, which is available at no additional charge to new and existing Starz subscribers. The service was launched on September 19, 2001, debuting on Adelphia Communications' Cleveland, Ohio, system. The service offers early premieres of feature films that are scheduled to premiere on Starz, up to one month prior to their pay cable debut on the primary linear channel. Starz on Demand's rotating program selection incorporates selected new titles that are added each Friday, and existing program titles held over from the previous one to two weeks. The Starz On Demand name was also used for an online broadband streaming movie service operated by Starz and RealNetworks from 2003 to 2004. In March 2011, Starz On Demand launched a third VOD service (in addition to its standard-definition and high-definition VOD services), offering movies presented in 3D to customers of Comcast and Verizon FiOS at no additional charge.

==== Starzplay (U.S.) ====
Starzplay logo

The original incarnation of Starzplay was a website and mobile app that featured original programming and feature film content from Starz available for streaming in standard or high definition. It was available to Starz subscribers of Verizon FIOS, AT&T U-verse, Cox Communications, Xfinity by Comcast and DirecTV until it was merged with Starz.com on April 5, 2016. The former incarnation of the Starzplay online service (which is structured as a TV Everywhere-style service) was launched on October 8, 2012, with the release of the iPad, iPhone and iPod Touch app until they were merged with Starz.com on April 5, 2016.

The Starzplay name was borrowed from a prior service offered in conjunction with Netflix. It was created in 2008 after the subscription streaming service struck an agreement with Starz Entertainment to allow Netflix to sub-license rights to films from distributors that maintain output deals with the linear Starz channel for online viewing – in lieu of acquiring the digital distribution rights on its own, due to the expense of acquiring newer film titles – as Netflix was considered to be merely a "content aggregator". Because Netflix chose to sub-license digital rights through Starz instead of negotiating with the studios, Walt Disney Studios Motion Pictures threatened not to renew its output deal with Starz unless it either discontinued its deal with Netflix or paid Disney a licensing fee for digital streaming rights to its films (Netflix ended up assuming rights to most film releases by Walt Disney Studios from Starz in 2016).

Starzplay (as a Netflix service) was first made available to Starz subscribers of the Verizon FiOS television service. Starz content (including most of its original programming and series content that the channel acquired through domestic and foreign distributors) was made available on Netflix's "Watch Instantly" platform. It was the third subscription video-on-demand online streaming service operated by Starz: Starz Ticket operated from 2004 to 2006, under a joint venture between Starz Entertainment and RealNetworks. Starz launched Vongo, a separate online movie service for subscribers, which operated from 2006 until it was discontinued on September 30, 2008.

On September 1, 2011, Starz announced that it would not renew its streaming agreement with Netflix, which ended on February 28, 2012; movie titles that are available on DVD from Sony Pictures, Disney and other studios that maintain pay-TV distribution deals with Starz were not affected and can be acquired from Netflix by this method. With the expiration of the Netflix deal, film content from studios with which Starz maintains broadcast rights were no longer available for online streaming, particularly as Netflix and certain similar services such as Vudu did not have separate streaming rights to films from these individual studios. Prior to the beta launch of its Starz Online service (which became Starzplay upon its official launch), Starz announced on November 18, 2011, that it was developing a streaming application for mobile devices, allowing the network's subscribers – and in early reports, speculation that possibly non-subscription television subscribers would be allowed as well – to view Starz's series and film content. The app was released on October 9, 2012, for Apple's iPad, iPhone and iPod Touch, and on May 7, 2013, for Android devices. An app for authenticated subscribers for the Xbox 360 was released on December 3, 2013, followed by a similar app for the Xbox One on August 5, 2014.

==== Lionsgate+ ====
Lionsgate+ logo

Lionsgate+ (previously Starzplay), Starzplay Arabia, and Lionsgate Play (in the South and Southeast Asia region) were Starz's international streaming services for viewers outside North America.

Starzplay Arabia was the first Starz-branded service to be localized outside the United States, launching on April 2, 2015, in 17 countries in the Middle East and North Africa (MENA) region, breaching those territories before its biggest competitor in media streaming being Netflix. Starzplay Arabia remains available even as the U.S. version of the service has been discontinued. In 2018, the service became available in Pakistan, as a joint venture between Cinepax, a cinema chain in Pakistan, and Lionsgate's StarzPlay Arabia. In 2019, Starzplay was launched in Brazil and Europe (France, Germany, Ireland, Spain and the United Kingdom). In 2020, it became available in Argentina, Chile, and Italy. In March 2022, a 57% majority stake in Starzplay Arabia was acquired by a consortium, led by e& (formerly known as Etisalat) and the Abu Dhabi-based investment group ADQ. The deal was valued at $420m. In January 2021, Starzplay Arabia signed a deal with Abu Dhabi Media, which allows subscribers to watch UFC fights and events live.

In several countries, Lionsgate+ is provided through partnerships with cable services, such as Vodafone in Spain, Movistar TV in Argentina, IndiHome in Indonesia and PLDT Home in the Philippines or within Apple TV as well.

On September 28, 2022, Lionsgate announced the international Starzplay service would be rebranded as Lionsgate+ the following day in most countries, eliminating much of the conflict between Lionsgate and Disney's Star brand. The Starzplay Arabia and Lionsgate Play services would not be affected at that time, while Starz in the U.S. and Canada merely rebranded with a new version of the "STARZ" logo.

In November 2022, it was announced that Lionsgate+ was ending operations in the markets of France, Germany, Italy, Spain, Benelux, the Nordics, and Japan before the end of the company's fiscal year.

In August 2023, Lionsgate announced that Lionsgate+ would leave Latin America on December 31, 2023. In November, the shutdown date was changed to December 11, 2023, while customers who have accessed Lionsgate+ through Amazon Prime Video would have continued to access streaming until February 9, 2024.

On November 4, 2023, Lionsgate announced that Lionsgate+ would cease its operations in the UK in early 2024. On December 19, it was confirmed that the shutdown date would be on February 29, 2024.

On November 14, 2024, Lionsgate+ became available in New Zealand as an add-on subscription via Amazon Prime Video.

On January 13, 2026, Lionsgate sold Lionsgate Play's Indian and Southeast Asian operations to the streaming service's president Rohit Jain for an undisclosed sum. As part of the transaction, Jain left Lionsgate and secured a multi-year licensing agreement to use the Lionsgate name for the service as well as access to catalog content for the streamer.

On April 9, 2026, Lionsgate+ became available in the United States as an add-on subscription via Amazon Prime Video.

==== Starz app and subscription service ====
On April 5, 2016, Starz launched a new app and over-the-top subscription service to compete with HBO Now and Showtime's OTT subscription service. The new app, which replaced the StarzPlay service, allowed users to access Starz programming regardless of whether they had a TV package or not. The Starz app also includes offline playback functionality, allowing users to download and watch content without an internet connection.

While the new STARZ app caters mostly to the North America users, the STARZ ON app (formerly STARZPLAY) is primarily focused towards the Middle East & North Africa (MENA) region. Starz ON has a varied library of original content, with live streaming capabilities. STARZPLAY stands out as the premium live-streaming service for movies, TV shows and live sports (cricket, football & more) in the MENA region; with more than 3 million subscribers, mainly from Saudi Arabia & the United Arab Emirates.

In response to the discontinuation of StarzPlay, Comcast has blocked access to the new Starz app for Comcast Xfinity customers, forcing them to instead access the network's authenticated content through the Xfinity app and website and older StarzPlay apps on platforms such as Roku. Currently, Comcast is the only major distributor to do this.

==== Starz on Amazon Video ====
In the winter of 2015, Amazon Video began offering Starz and rival premium network Showtime as add-on subscriptions for their customers; the cost is $8.99 per month, after a seven-day free trial. The content deal between Amazon and Starz not only offers the channel's current and back catalog of programming, but also movies and classic TV series currently airing on Encore and its branded networks, as well as live East Coast feeds of the Starz-branded networks and Encore.

==== Starz on Fubo ====
In December 2020, FuboTV added Starz to its roster of premium channels.

== Programming ==
=== Film library ===
As of 2026, Starz and sister networks Starz Encore and MoviePlex maintain an exclusive first-run film licensing agreement with Lionsgate Films (since 2022, including Summit Entertainment since 2023).

Despite being acquired by Lions Gate Entertainment in 2016, films released under the Lionsgate label did not air on Starz until 2022 due to an output deal with Epix until the end of 2019, then Hulu until the end of 2021. Summit Entertainment films did not air on Starz until 2023 due to an output deal with HBO until the end of 2022.

Starz also shows sub-runs (runs of films that have recently received broadcast or syndicated television airings) of theatrical films from Walt Disney Studios Motion Pictures (including subsidiaries Walt Disney Pictures, Touchstone Pictures, Marvel Studios, Lucasfilm, 20th Century Studios, and Hollywood Pictures - all for films released before 2016), Warren Miller Films (for films released before 2020), Sony Pictures Entertainment (including subsidiaries Columbia Pictures, Sony Pictures Classics, Screen Gems, Destination Films, Triumph Films, and TriStar Pictures—all for films released before 2022), Skydance (including content from subsidiaries Warner Bros. Pictures, New Line Cinema, Turner Entertainment—both for films released prior to 2005—and Castle Rock Entertainment, Paramount Pictures, DreamWorks Pictures (pre-2011), Republic Pictures, Nickelodeon Movies, Dimension Films (pre-2005), Miramax, Paramount Vantage and television rights to the Cannon Films and Carolco Pictures libraries), Amazon MGM Studios (including content from subsidiaries United Artists, Orion Pictures, and The Samuel Goldwyn Company), Europa Corp, Revolution Studios, Overture Films, Yari Film Group, and the network's sister company Lions Gate Entertainment (since 2012).

Films for which Starz has pay-cable rights usually also run on Encore and MoviePlex during the duration of its term of licensing. From 1995 to 2002, Starz had broadcast occasional original made-for-pay cable movies produced by the in-house company Starz! Pictures.

==== Former first-run contracts ====
At the time of its launch, Starz had secured exclusive first-run film rights with Universal Pictures, Touchstone Pictures, Hollywood Pictures, Miramax Films, New Line Cinema, Walt Disney Pictures, and Carolco Pictures. Between 1995 and 2005, Starz had also broadcast films from Turner Pictures and New Line Cinema. The New Line deal does not include the film Boogie Nights, due to runtime concerns, the film instead airs on HBO. Starz's contract with Universal Pictures expired in late 2002, with HBO and Starz sharing half of Universal Pictures' films during the 2003 calendar year before HBO assumed pay-TV rights in 2004. On July 15, 2021, Starz reached a licensing deal with Universal Pictures for first-run movies 18 months after they streamed on Peacock and Amazon Prime Video respectively. Starz would later exit out of the deal with Universal in 2026, two years before it was set to expire, citing lower than expected viewership of the films as a result of subscriber overlap between Amazon Prime and Starz.

In 1997, Starz lost its rights to many of the Dimension Films to Showtime, due to its violent content surrounding the films, except for several future Jackie Chan films Dimension Films released, which Starz kept the rights. After the Showtime deal, in August 1999, Starz preemptively signed a four-year deal with Dimension Films that took effect in January 2003, in conjunction with a four-year extension of its existing deal with Miramax Films and the rest of the Disney family. In 2002, Starz picked up the pay-TV rights to Disney's animated films, which previously bypassed a pay-TV window.

In January 1997, Starz secured a licensing agreement with Paramount Pictures, broadcasting over 300 titles. Paramount Pictures' first contract with Starz expired in January 2006. In April 2013, Starz reassumed sub-run rights to Paramount Pictures' feature film releases. Films that were initially broadcast through this deal included Dear God, All I Want for Christmas and Boomerang.

In 1999, the company secured deals with producer The Shooting Gallery and film distributor Destination Films to release its output to Starz.

In 2001, Starz had acquired pay television rights to two pictures from Sony Pictures Entertainment, namely Crouching Tiger, Hidden Dragon, and Tokyo Raiders. The deal came after Sony Pictures Classics went homeless since its expiration of the pay TV deal with Showtime. Starz was also one of the bidders for Jurassic Park III, and eventually won.

The first-run film output agreement with Walt Disney Studios Motion Pictures expired after December 2015, with Netflix assuming pay television rights in January 2016 (excluding films released by Touchstone Pictures, which were retained by Starz through a separate contract). Through at least the first half of 2016, Starz provided Disney films that were released before the expiration, such as Inside Out and The Good Dinosaur, but none released after, such as Zootopia.

The first-run film output agreement with Sony was renewed for nine years on February 11, 2013 and expired at the end of 2021. On April 8, 2021, Sony announced that they would not be renewing the agreement with Starz in favor of a new first-run agreement with Netflix.

The Warren Miller output deal was renewed for 10 years on October 19, 2009, and the deal ended in 2019.

=== Television series ===
==== Original programming ====
Starz expanded its program offerings to include some original television series by the late 1990s, with five entertainment news programs and shows that focused on the making of upcoming or current feature films (such as Starz Movie News and Hollywood One on One); some of these programs were also aired on Encore. These shows and documentaries were produced under the name Starz Encore Entertainment, which was formed in 1999. In 2005, Starz began expanding its original programming slate in order to compete with rivals Showtime, Cinemax and HBO, with the inclusion of scripted series. Starz Encore Entertainment was renamed Starz Originals. Some of the initial series (such as Kung Faux, The Bronx Bunny Show and Head Case) maintained running times considered unconventional for a live-action series, usually running under 15 minutes in length; half-hour and hour-long series were eventually incorporated on the schedule by 2010 (including shows such as Spartacus, Torchwood: Miracle Day in 2011, Boss and Da Vinci's Demons).

The number of original series that debuted each year on Starz has varied, reaching a high of four series during the 2011 calendar year. In 2013, Starz gave a series order to Outlander, a drama based on the Outlander book series by Diana Gabaldon. The project, from Battlestar Galactica developer Ronald D. Moore and Sony Pictures Television, received a 16-episode order, with production beginning in Scotland (where the books are set) in October 2013. Outlander has received five nominations for the 2015 Women's Image Network Awards, including a nomination in the Drama Series category. Caitriona Balfe, who plays the leading character in the show, also received a nomination in the Actress Drama Series category.

After Starz's 2016 acquisition by Lionsgate, the network has moved to produce more original content, with president of programming Carmi Zlotnik calling Starz a "content pump" for Lionsgate.

==== Acquired programming ====
Multiplex channel Starz Kids & Family also features some series programming, which are aimed at young children and preteens. That channel runs two program blocks: "Building Blocks", a block airing on Monday through Saturday mornings that features animated imported series from Europe (such as Dragon Hunters, Gawayn, Zombie Hotel, Savage Family Wild and Matt's Monsters) and the "Six Block" (originally titled "Camp Block" from its launch in March 2011 until the two-hour block was moved from mid-afternoon slots varying on the film schedule to a set timeslot of 6:00 pm Eastern Time in January 2012), a teen-focused block airing weekday afternoons that features mainly imported series from English-speaking countries outside of America like Canada, Australia and the United Kingdom (such as Wingin' It, Genie in the House, Majority Rules! and Sadie J). The two blocks are similar to those seen on sister channel Encore's multiplex channel Encore Wam between 1994 and 2009.

== Other ventures ==
Starz Entertainment has expanded considerably with the presence of its Starz and Encore family of multiplex networks, as well as ventures into television and film production, and home video distribution.

- In 1994, Starz launched the in-house company Starz Pictures, a production company that produced made-for-cable films for the television channel; Starz Pictures' only major film project was the 2002 telefilm Joe and Max. Starz Pictures shut down that same year.
- In 2006, Liberty Media purchased IDT Entertainment, which was merged into Starz Entertainment and renamed Starz Media. As a result of the purchase, Starz acquired IDT subsidiaries Anchor Bay Entertainment, Digital Production Solutions (DPS), and New Arc Entertainment. The Weinstein Company, a film studio run by former Miramax heads Bob and Harvey Weinstein, purchased a 25% stake in Starz Media (but not the Starz parent company) on January 4, 2011, with Anchor Bay entering into a multi-year domestic distribution agreement of theatrical feature films released by The Weinstein Company and its Dimension Films subsidiary.
- In November 2006, Chris McGurk and Danny Rosett launched Overture Films, an independent movie studio that Liberty Media operated out of its Starz Entertainment division. After a proposed sale of the company failed to materialize through the absence of willing buyers, the studio was shut down in October 2010, with its marketing and distribution operations handed over to Relativity Media; Overture's small library of less than 20 films continued to be distributed by Anchor Bay Entertainment for DVD release and by Starz for television broadcast.
- As part of IDT Entertainment's purchase by Liberty Media, Starz Entertainment also acquired two animation studios: Toronto-based IDT Entertainment animation studio (formerly DKP Studios), which was renamed Starz Animation, and Manga Entertainment, an international distributor of Japanese animation. Another animation studio that was also acquired due to the IDT purchase, Film Roman, was sold in October 2010 to a production company owned by a group of investors led by former Film Roman studio president Scott Greenberg called Bento Box Entertainment.

== Branding ==
Starz's logo has incorporated a star in some form since its launch. In the original logo that was used from its launch in February 1994 until March 27, 2005, the star was composed of two silhouettes (one star cut out from another, larger one), and a 1930s movie-styled "STARZ!" text. The original accompanying graphics were set around a CGI movie theater, with the main network ID featuring seats that opened by themselves, various theater imagery and even images resembling the Caduceus, while feature presentation bumpers heavily used the movie theater themes (using spotlights and film canisters) and the "Encore 8" branding. The "theater" branding used since Starz's launch was replaced in May 2002, with a new graphics package based around natural themes (particularly water). A five-note fanfare was also introduced as a musical motif, however the new look did not carry over to the multiplex channels. Starz! also introduced the "InfoBar", a lower-third banner graphic that appears on-screen during promotional breaks and during the end credits of films seen on the channel, originally purposed to promote upcoming programs.

The 1994 logo was replaced in March 2005 with an abstract star shooting upwards and a more modern "starz" wordmark in Helvetica Neue. This was part of a major rebrand of the network that included a blue liquid standardized graphics package with a different color such as silver, red, green, purple, and orange for each multiplex channel; the fanfare from the previous graphics package was also re-orchestrated by Mixology Post. The "InfoBar" also began to be used to promote events on the other Starz networks and to provide entertainment news headlines supplied by Variety (a similar version was adopted for use by the Encore networks). That year, Starz introduced an opaque on-screen logo bug on the lower-right corner of the screen, appearing for two minutes each half-hour of the movie. Starting in Summer 2007, the 2005 logo bug for every Starz, Encore and Movieplex channel appears throughout the whole movie, until Starz reverted every screenbug back to appearing for two minutes every half hour during the April 2008 rebrand, except for Encore, Movieplex, and Starz Cinema. The introduction of the Starz on-screen logo bugs was cited by former Starz president Tom Southwick due to a large number of subscribers not knowing which of the channels they were watching when they tuned in, particularly if started viewing one of the channels after the start of a film.

The logo was changed in April 2008, with a new "starz" wordmark in a different font, with a star shining between the "a" and "r". It was introduced in black, but the coloring of the logo was modified to an orange/gold gradient in April 2011. The channel replaced the opaque on-screen logo bugs with a white logo bug on all channels and a bright orange bug for Starz HD as of April 7, 2008, and Starz Kids & Family's HD simulcast feed in July 2011. After the 2011 rebrand, the white logo bug for every Starz channel stayed on-screen throughout the whole movie again until February 2012, when it reverted to fifteen seconds every hour, also applying to Encore channels. After this logo's introduction, the "InfoBar" switched back to promoting programming only on the main Starz channel, but it served as a network ID on some of its multiplex channels.

In 2016, Starz redesigned its logo again, with a new uppercase "STARZ" wordmark in black. When it appeared on-screen, it was white against a black background.

In 2022, following the renaming of StarzPlay to Lionsgate+, Starz got a new logo, with a bolder teal wordmark, which appears in a yellow-sky blue gradient on-screen.

=== Network slogans ===
- Starz More of What You Want for Less (1994–???)
- Only on Starz and No Other Movie Channel (early February 1994–August 1995)
- Starz! – Big Movies and More (September 1, 1995–late October 1998)
- 100% Movies (November 1, 1998–late August 1999)
- Movies, Movies, New Hit Movies (September 1, 1999–early September 2000)
- #1 in New Hit Movies (September 18, 2000–late December 2004)
- An Influx of Movies – Only on Starz (early January 2005–late March 2008)
- Are You Ready? (April 2008–late August 2012)
- Taking You Places (September 2012–March 2016)
- Obsessable (April 2016–September 2022)
- Just You Watch (September 2022–present)
- We're All Adults Here (July 2024 – present, secondary)

== See also ==
- PRISM (TV channel)
