= IFC (American TV channel) =

American pay TV channel

- Country: United States
- Broadcast area: Nationwide
- Headquarters: New York City, United States

Programming
- Language: English
- Picture format: 1080i HDTV (downscaled to letterboxed 480i for the SDTV feed)

Ownership
- Owner: AMC Global Media
- Sister channels: AMC; BBC America; Sundance TV; We TV

History
- Launched: September 1, 1994; 32 years ago
- Former names: Independent Film Channel (1994–2014)

Links
- Website: IFC.com

Availability

Streaming media
- IFC.com: IFC - Watch Now (U.S. cable subscribers only; requires login from pay television provider to access content)
- Service(s): DirecTV Stream, Philo, Sling TV, YouTube TV

IFC is an American basic cable channel owned by AMC Global Media. Launched in 1994 as the Independent Film Channel, a spin-off of former sister channel Bravo, IFC originally operated as a commercial-free service, devoted to showing independent films without interruption. Starting in the late 2000s, the channel gradually moved its programming from independent films into comedy, horror, and cult television shows and films. IFC became an ad-supported service in 2010, and officially retired its full name in 2014.

AMC Global Media operates a subsidiary known as Independent Film Company (formerly known as IFC Films), the film offshoot of the channel that operates the IFC Center. In September 2018, it was estimated that approximately 75,295,000 American households (63% of households with television) received IFC. By December 2023, that number would drop to 56,185,000 households.

== History ==
IFC logo, used from 2001 to 2010. It continued to be used on IFC Canada until its closure in 2019 and for the IFC Films label until 2025. Still used for the IFC Center.

The channel debuted on September 1, 1994, under the ownership of Rainbow Media, a subsidiary of Cablevision Systems Corporation. IFC originated as a spin-off of then-sibling channel Bravo, which focused at that time on a wider variety of programming, including shows related to fine arts. In 2000, IFC launched a motion picture division.

In 2005, IFC expanded into its first non-television venture and opened the IFC Center, a movie theater for independent film in New York City. In 2008, IFC launched its Media Lab Studios, a section of its website on which users can enter IFC-sponsored film contests, and can view others' films. In 2008, Rainbow Media acquired IFC's rival network, Sundance Channel, from Robert Redford and Showtime Networks.

Logo from 2010 to 2014

Logo from 2014 to 2018

Towards the end of the decade, IFC began to expand its programming beyond independent films, producing original series and acquiring cult television series. In March 2010, IFC unveiled a new slogan, "Always on. Slightly off.", reflecting the channel's new focus on comedy programming. On December 8, IFC began airing commercials within its programming, a move that sparked controversy among its viewers, and would also begin to censor its programming.

IFC eventually reversed its censorship practices and started to air its programming uncut; publicly trumpeting this fact in 2012 by releasing ads featuring showings of back-to-back blocks of movies like the Friday the 13th film series, highlighting the nudity and gore. On July 1, 2011, Rainbow Media was spun off from Cablevision into a separate company, which was renamed AMC Networks.

=== 2012 Dish Network carriage dispute ===
On May 4, 2012, Dish Network announced that it would no longer carry the AMC Networks family of cable channels upon the expiration of the satellite provider's distribution agreement with the company at the end of June 2012, citing that AMC Networks charged an excessive amount in retransmission consent payments from the service for their carriage and low audience viewership for the channels.

AMC Networks responded to Dish Network's announcement of its pending removal of the channels as being related to a 2008 breach of contract lawsuit against Dish Network by the company's former Voom HD Networks subsidiary (under the company's previous Rainbow Media Holdings brand) (which is pending trial in the New York State Supreme Court), in which it is seeking more than $2.5 billion in damages against Dish Network for improperly terminating its carriage contract; Voom's high-definition channels were carried on the provider from May 1, 2005, until May 12, 2008, when Dish removed ten of Voom's fifteen channels from its lineup and the five remaining channels the following day. Dish Network stated that the lawsuit is unrelated to the decision to remove the AMC Networks channels and that it ended the carriage agreement on its own terms.

On May 20, 2012, Dish Network removed Sundance Channel from its channel lineup. Two weeks later on June 4, 2012, Dish relocated AMC, WEtv, and IFC to higher channel positions with AMC being split into two separate standard definition and high definition channel feeds (AMC moved from channel 130 to channel 9609 for the SD feed and 9610 for the HD feed, WEtv moved from channel 128 to channel 9608 and IFC was moved from channel 393 to channel 9607); the former channel lineup spaces occupied by the three channels were respectively replaced with HDNet, Style and MoviePlex multiplex channel Indieplex. The move is believed to be in response to an ad run during a June 3 airing of an episode of Mad Men urging Dish Network customers to inform the company to keep the three AMC Networks channels on the satellite provider, with Dish Network stating that the relocated channel positions better reflect the channels' ratings.

On July 1, 2012, Dish Network dropped AMC, WEtv, and IFC from the channel line-up altogether.

On October 21, 2012, AMC Networks announced a settlement was reached between them, Cablevision and Dish in which Dish was forced to pay up to $700 million in damages to Cablevision for damages from removing Voom owned channels off the Dish lineup back in 2008, and in return Dish signed a new agreement to bring the AMC Networks owned channels back on the Dish lineup with AMC returning October 21 and the rest on November 1.

=== Recent history ===
On January 9, 2014, it was announced that the channel's full name had been retired, and that the name IFC would officially have no meaning. On November 15, 2016, AMC Networks acquired a minority stake in comedy video website and film and television production company Funny or Die, with plans to integrate it with IFC. On April 27, 2018, the company later acquired a majority stake in comedy venue operator Levity Live.

In February 2025, AMC Networks reported a $269 million domestic impairment charge related to its portfolio of U.S. cable networks, including IFC Films, citing an industry-wide decline in the value of traditional linear television assets.

In May 2025, as part of its 25th anniversary preparations, IFC Films unveiled a new logo incorporating the full name Independent Film Company, along with a custom sonic logo created by Adam Ad-Rock Horovitz of the Beastie Boys.

== Programming ==
IFC primarily airs comedy and horror-genre programming, including both original and acquired series and films. Original programming produced for the channel over the years include Documentary Now!, Sherman's Showcase, Whitest Kids U'Know, and British co-production Year of the Rabbit.

== International version ==
=== Canada ===
The Canadian version of the Independent Film Channel launched on August 15, 2001, under the ownership of Salter Street Films, under a brand licensing agreement with Rainbow Media. Alliance Atlantis acquired the channel in December 2001, through its purchase of Salter Street Films. On January 18, 2008, a joint venture between Canwest and Goldman Sachs Alternatives known as CW Media, acquired control of IFC through its purchase of Alliance Atlantis' broadcasting assets, which were placed in a trust in August 2007.

On October 27, 2010, IFC Canada's ownership changed again through Shaw Communications' acquisition of Canwest and Goldman Sachs' interest in CW Media. As with its U.S. namesake, the channel originally focused almost exclusively on smaller independent films. However, IFC Canada broadened its programming focus to include more mainstream films from large production studios, as the U.S. channel has done. It also de-emphasized the use of the full "Independent Film Channel" name, possibly due to the decrease in the number of independent films on its schedule.

None of IFC's original programming aired on IFC Canada during its run. Rival broadcaster Bell Media currently owns exclusive rights to their shows and has aired them on their various networks, including Crave and Much. The channel ceased broadcasting on September 30, 2019.
