= MoviePlex =

American pay television network

- Current logo used since 2006
- Country: United States
- Broadcast area: Nationwide
- Headquarters: Meridian, Colorado

Programming
- Languages: English; Spanish (via SAP audio track; some films may be broadcast in their native language and subtitled into English)
- Picture format: 1080i (HDTV); 480i (SDTV)
- Timeshift service: MoviePlex East; MoviePlex West; IndiePlex East; IndiePlex West; RetroPlex East; RetroPlex West

Ownership
- Owner: Starz Entertainment
- Parent: Starz Inc.
- Key people: Jeffrey Hirsch (President/CEO, Starz Inc.); Audrey Lee (EVP/General Counsel, Starz Inc.)
- Sister channels: Starz; Starz Encore; IndiePlex

History
- Launched: January 1, 1997; 29 years ago
- Replaced: INTRO Television (originally TV! Network); Encore Plus
- Former names: Plex: Encore 1 (1997)

Availability

Streaming media
- Hulu + Live TV: Internet Protocol television: MoviePlex East; MoviePlex West; IndiePlex East; IndiePlex West; RetroPlex East; RetroPlex West

MoviePlex, stylized as movieplex since 2006, is an American premium cable and satellite television network owned by the Starz Inc. subsidiary of Starz Entertainment and headquartered at the Meridian International Business Center complex in Meridian, Colorado. Launched on January 1, 1997 as Plex: Encore 1, its programming consists of recent, as well as older theatrically released feature films. It is the sister channel of Starz and Starz Encore.

== History ==
MoviePlex originally launched on January 1, 1997 as Plex: Encore 1; it replaced both INTRO Television (originally called TV! Network until September 1995), a cable TV channel that was launched in June 1994 by Liberty Media (original owner of MoviePlex through a joint venture with parent company Tele-Communications, Inc.), which aired "sampler" blocks of programming from other cable channels without full coverage; and Encore Plus, a secondary Encore network that had utilized what came to be MoviePlex's format. The channel also had some original content. The relaunched network was initially referred to as "Plex" in promotions, with the numbering system used by the Encore networks at the time giving it the designation "Encore 1"; the network assumed the MoviePlex name in Autumn 1997.

MoviePlex's original programming format carried on that of its predecessor, as the channel featured day-long blocks of several programs from Encore's themed multiplex channels each day of the week, with a different channel being showcased each day; prior to MoviePlex's conversion into a standalone channel, it broadcast programming from children-oriented WAM! (now Starz Encore Family) on Sundays, Love Stories (now Starz Encore Classic, but shifted to vintage films) on Mondays, the main Encore channel on Tuesdays, Westerns (now Starz Encore Westerns) on Wednesdays, Action (now Starz Encore Action) on Thursdays, Mystery (now Starz Encore Suspense) on Fridays and True Stories (later Encore Drama; now Starz Encore Black, but aimed at AfrAm viewing) on Saturdays. Programming was shown on a one-hour delay from its presentation on that respective Encore channel, with R-rated films omitted from MoviePlex's schedule and replaced with alternative G-, PG- and PG-13-rated film titles. Presumably, this was to give viewers a chance to try out each channel of the multiplex until subscribing to it; alternatively, it also served as an outlet for some of the multiplex programming as some cable providers did not carry them all.

On June 2, 1997, TCI announced a deal in which it transferred majority ownership of its Encore Media Group subsidiary to Liberty Media, a transaction done in part to shield TCI from effects resulting from the significant profit losses incurred by Starz following that channel's launch – TCI retained a non-majority 20% ownership interest until its 1999 merger with AT&T Corporation, when Liberty Media assumed full ownership of the Encore Media Group.

On April 4, 2006, at 12:00 a.m. Eastern Time, Movieplex launched Retroplex, another companion multiplex channel that focuses on older films from the 1980s and earlier. RetroPlex first broadcast the Samuel Fuller-directed drama Pickup on South Street. A few months later, Movieplex launched Indieplex, a companion multiplex channel dedicated to independent films. The channel launched on June 8, 2006 and its first broadcast of the Wim Wenders-directed western Paris, Texas.

On November 19, 2009, Liberty Media spun off Starz, Encore and MoviePlex into a separate public tracking stock named Liberty Starz. On August 1, 2011, MoviePlex adopted its own separate programming schedule, ending the sampler block format of films and other programs seen on the several Encore multiplex channels. On August 8, 2012, Liberty Media announced that it would spun off Liberty Starz into its own separate publicly-traded company. The spin-off of the subsidiary was completed on January 11, 2013, with Liberty Starz changing its name to Starz Inc. as a result.

On April 5, 2016, Starz was rebranded and added all of the Encore channels to its moniker, therefore increasing the Starz channel lineup to 14 Starz movie channels. Its main channel was rebranded "Starz Encore" and carries Starz repeats in addition to films.

On June 30, 2016, US-Canadian film company Lionsgate agreed to acquire Starz Inc. for $4.4 billion in cash and stock; the acquisition was completed five months later on December 8.

== Channels ==
=== List of channels ===
Depending on the service provider, MoviePlex provides up to six multiplex channels – three 24-hour multiplex channels, which are simulcast in both standard definition and high definition – as well as a subscription video-on-demand service (MoviePlex On Demand).

MoviePlex broadcasts its primary and multiplex channels on Pacific and Eastern Time Zone schedules. The premium film service Starz and Encore, which are both also owned by Starz Inc., operate as separate services – although subscribers to MoviePlex do not necessarily have to subscribe to either of the two sister services.

Channel	Description and programming
MoviePlex	The main "flagship" feed; MoviePlex primarily broadcasts feature films released between the late 1980s and the current years.
RetroPlex	Launched on April 3, 2006, the channel focuses on showcasing vintage films released between the 1910s to the early-mid 1980s.
IndiePlex	Launched on June 8, 2006, IndiePlex is a secondary channel with a focus on domestic and foreign independent films, and arthouse releases.

=== Other services ===
==== MoviePlex HD ====
MoviePlex HD is a high definition simulcast feed of MoviePlex that broadcasts in the 1080i resolution format. IndiePlex and RetroPlex also maintain their own respective HD simulcasts, IndiePlex HD and RetroPlex HD. Unusual for a premium service, its multiplex channels have been available in HD for several years; however, the main MoviePlex channel in contrast did not have a high definition simulcast feed of its own until 2013. MoviePlex HD, IndiePlex HD and RetroPlex HD are all currently available nationally on the sat-TV system Dish Network, and regionally on certain cable providers.

==== MoviePlex On Demand ====
MoviePlex On Demand is MoviePlex's video on demand service, which launched on April 4, 2006. MoviePlex On Demand's rotating program selection incorporates select new titles that are added each Friday, alongside existing program titles held over from the previous version into two weeks. It is currently available to Comcast subscribers.

==== MoviePlex Play ====
MoviePlex Play was a now-defunct website and mobile app that provided feature film content from MoviePlex available for streaming in standard or high definition. It was available to MoviePlex subscribers of AT&T U-verse and Cox Communications until it was merged with Starz.com on April 5, 2016. The MoviePlex Play's iPad, iPhone and iPod Touch app was first released on December 18, 2012, followed by the release of the app for Android devices on May 7, 2013.

== Programming ==
Although the channel is not purposely formatted as a family-oriented service, MoviePlex's primary channel does not broadcast films with a Motion Picture Association of America rating of "R" nor a TV Parental Guideline rating of "TV-MA". This dates back to the channel's original format of running sampler blocks of Encore's multiplex channels, MoviePlex did not technically simulcast each Encore channel's programs as a result, scheduling films during each day's schedule that differed from those seen on the Encore networks in some timeslots. In contrast, IndiePlex and RetroPlex will televise films with those assigned ratings.

=== Movie library ===
MoviePlex – through Starz – maintains exclusive first-run film licensing agreements with Sony Pictures Entertainment (since January 2005; including content from subsidiaries Columbia Pictures, Sony Pictures Classics, Screen Gems, Destination Films, Triumph Films, TriStar Pictures, and Sony Pictures Animation), Anchor Bay Entertainment (the network's former home media arm), and Warren Miller Films (since 1997).

The first-run film output agreement with Walt Disney Pictures expired after December 2015, with the Netflix streaming service assuming the pay television rights in January 2016 (excluding films released by Touchstone Pictures (now 20th Century Studios [although Starz's rival HBO expired all of films in late 2023]), which will be retained by Starz through a separate contract). On April 8, 2021, Sony Pictures Entertainment announced that they would not be renewing the agreement with Starz in favor of a new first-run agreement with Netflix. On July 15, 2021, Starz reached a licensing deal with Universal Pictures for first-run movies 18 months after they stream on Peacock and Prime Video respectively. The first-run film output agreement with the Warren Miller deal was renewed for ten years on October 19, 2009.

MoviePlex also shows sub-runs – runs of films that have already received broadcast or syndicated television airings – of theatrical films from Walt Disney Studios Motion Pictures (including content from subsidiaries Walt Disney Pictures, Pixar Animation Studios, Walt Disney Animation Studios, Marvel Studios, Disneynature, 20th Century Studios, Hollywood Pictures, and Touchstone Pictures; for films released prior to 2016), Warner Bros. Discovery (including content from subsidiaries New Line Cinema, Turner Entertainment (both for films released prior to 2005), and Castle Rock Entertainment), Universal Pictures (including content from subsidiaries Universal Animation Studios, Focus Features, and DreamWorks Animation with all for films released prior to 2003), Amazon MGM Studios (including content from subsidiaries United Artists, Orion Pictures, and The Samuel Goldwyn Company), Paramount Skydance (including content from subsidiaries Paramount Pictures and Miramax Films), Revolution Studios, Overture Films (the network's former film division), Yari Film Group, and eventually, the network's parent company Lions Gate Entertainment.

In January 1997, MoviePlex secured a licensing agreement with Paramount Pictures, broadcasting over 300 movie titles. Paramount's first contract with MoviePlex expired in December 2005. In March 2013, MoviePlex reassumed sub-run rights to Paramount Pictures' feature film releases. The first film broadcast through this deal was Sunset Boulevard. Additional Paramount Pictures releases began to be broadcast on MoviePlex starting the following month, such as The Errand Boy, The Stooge and The Bellboy.

== Carriage ==
MoviePlex is available nationally on Dish Network, and regionally on select cable systems including Comcast Xfinity until October 27, 2020, Charter Spectrum and AT&T U-verse. IndiePlex and RetroPlex are currently available on Dish Network, Xfinity, Atlantic Broadband and Verizon FiOS.
