= Starz Inc. =

American mass media company

- Formerly: Liberty Star (1991); Encore Movie Group (1991–94); Encore Media Corporation (1994–98); Encore Media Group (1998–99); Starz Encore Media Group (1999–2001); Starz Encore Group (2001–05); Starz Entertainment Group (2005–09); Liberty Starz (2009–13)
- Type: Subsidiary
- Industry: Pay television
- Founded: 1991; 35 years ago (as Liberty Star)
- Headquarters: Santa Monica, California, United States
- Key people: Jeffrey Hirsch (president/CEO); Audrey Lee (EVP/General counsel); Scott Macdonald (CFO); Alison Hoffman (president, Domestic Networks)
- Revenue: $1.631 billion
- Operating income: $445 million
- Parent: Liberty Media (1991–2009); Starz Entertainment (2016–present)
- Divisions: Starz Networks
- Website: Official website

Starz Inc. is an American entertainment company and a subsidiary of Starz Entertainment. Founded in 1991 as Encore Movie Group, it is headquartered in Meridian, Colorado, but uses nearby Englewood as its location in corporate filings and press releases.

The company owns and operates pay television channels, including its namesake service, sibling networks Starz Encore and MoviePlex.

== History ==
=== Early history ===
Liberty Star (later renamed Encore Movie Group) was founded in 1991 as a wholly owned television programming subsidiary and a joint venture of Liberty Media and Tele-Communications Inc., two companies that were controlled by John C. Malone, and initially owned by JJS Communications, a company owned by former TCI sales marketing executive John J. Sie that gave as a minority owner. The two companies have also owned the International Channel Networks (later AZN Television, now defunct in 2008 with International Media Distribution remained as the company). The premium channel Encore was launched in 1991 on cable systems operated by Tele-Communications Inc., followed by the launch of Starz in 1994, and Encore Plex (now MoviePlex) in 1997. In 1994, Encore Movie Group was renamed Encore Media Corporation.

On June 2, 1997, TCI announced it would transfer part of its ownership stake in Encore Media Corporation to sister company Liberty Media, due in part to substantial losses incurred by the Starz network. TCI retained a minority 20% ownership interest in Encore Media Corporation, renamed Encore Media Group in 1998, until Liberty Media acquired TCI's stake following its 1999 merger with AT&T Corporation and assumed full ownership of the Encore Media Group.

In 1999, Encore Media Group was renamed the Starz Encore Media Group; "Media" was dropped off in 2001, becoming Starz Encore Group. The company also launched a film and documentary production division, Starz Encore Entertainment.

As part of a corporate restructuring in 2003, Starz Encore Group eliminated 100 jobs in its nine regional offices, four of which have been closed. On March 25, 2005, Starz Encore Group was renamed Starz Entertainment Group (also known as Starz Entertainment, LLC), and on March 28, the Starz! network was renamed Starz (dropping the exclamation point) and adopted a new logo featuring a hand-drawn star and a wordmark set in Helvetica Neue Black.

=== As Starz Media ===
On August 31, 2006, Liberty Media acquired the American division of IDT Entertainment for $186 million, followed by the Canadian and Australian divisions on September 29, 2006. IDT Entertainment was then merged under Starz Entertainment Group and renamed Starz Media. The company soon expanded into film production by launching Overture Films in 2006, followed by arthouse label Anchor Bay Films in 2008.

On November 19, 2009, Liberty Media spun off Starz Entertainment Group into a separate tracking stock, known as Liberty Starz. On January 1, 2010, Chris Albrecht became the president and CEO of Liberty Starz, overseeing the company's entities including Starz Entertainment, Overture Films, Anchor Bay Entertainment and Film Roman.

On January 4, 2011, The Weinstein Company (TWC) acquired 25% of Starz Media, one of the operating units of Liberty Starz. The arrangement included a five-year distribution deal under which starting in April 2011, Liberty Starz's Anchor Bay Entertainment would release new TWC films on DVD and Starz Digital Media would handle online downloads and streaming.

On August 8, 2012, Liberty Media announced that it would spin-off Liberty Starz into a separate public company; the transaction includes about $1.5 billion of debt. The spin-off of the subsidiary was expected to be completed by the end of 2012, but was actually completed on January 11, 2013. As a result of the spin-off, Liberty Starz changed its name to Starz Inc., began trading on NASDAQ under the ticker symbols STRZA and STRZB, and replaced Liberty Media in the NASDAQ-100 index. Starz Inc.'s businesses and assets at the time consisted of Starz Networks, Starz Distribution, and its minority stake in Arc Productions.

Starz was later replaced in the NASDAQ-100 index by Kraft Foods on March 18, 2013.

=== Acquisition by Lionsgate ===
On February 11, 2015, John C. Malone, the majority shareholder in both Starz and its former parent company Liberty Media, swapped a 4.5% stake with 14.5% of the voting power in Starz Inc. for 3.4% of shares in film and television entertainment company Lionsgate while joining the company's board of directors. Fourteen days later, Starz CEO Chris Albrecht hinted a possible merger with Lionsgate.

On November 10, 2015, Malone's two other companies, Liberty Global and Discovery Communications, made a joint investment of $195–400 million in Lionsgate and acquired a 3.4% stake in the company.

On June 30, 2016, Lionsgate agreed to acquire Starz Inc. for $4.4 billion in cash and stock. As part of the acquisition by Lionsgate, Starz Inc.'s home entertainment business have been subsumed into Lionsgate's Worldwide Home Entertainment division, as well as Starz Inc.'s Worldwide TV distribution group being similarly combined. On December 8, 2016, the deal was finalized thus making Starz a subsidiary of Lionsgate.

In August 2023, Lionsgate announced it would be exiting Latin America before spinning off Starz into its own company.

=== Spun off from Lionsgate ===
In November 2023, Lionsgate announced the spinoff of its film and television assets into its own separate publicly traded company. The new company, Lionsgate Studios, would be founded on May 14, 2024. As a result, Lionsgate announced that Starz would be laying off 10% of its work force, and exiting the television markets in both the UK and Australia by the end of 2023.

In 2024, Lionsgate would change its name to Starz Entertainment to distinguish itself from Lionsgate Studios.

On March 6, 2026, Byron Allen, owner of Allen Media Group, acquired a 11% stake in Starz, paying $25 million for 1.8 million shares in the entertainment company.

== Starz Networks ==
The Starz Networks division currently consists of 3 premium cable networks and their various multiplex channels; 17 channels collectively.

- MoviePlex
  - MoviePlex
  - IndiePlex
  - RetroPlex
- Starz
  - Starz
  - Starz Cinema
  - Starz Comedy
  - Starz Edge
  - Starz in Black
  - Starz Kids & Family
- Starz Encore
  - Starz Encore
  - Starz Encore Action
  - Starz Encore Black
  - Starz Encore Classic
  - Starz Encore Español
  - Starz Encore Family
  - Starz Encore Suspense
  - Starz Encore Westerns
