= List of Warren Miller films =

This is a complete list of films in the Warren Miller series of ski films. Miller directed the films through White Winter Heat (1987), his last. He continued to be involved in producing the movies until 2004, primarily by providing the narration. Warren Miller returned to the screen in 2016 for "Here, There, and Everywhere" and was featured in interviews. Warren Miller Entertainment is currently owned by Outside Inc., and continues to produce the annual films and film tour.

Warren Miller directed.

Warren Miller narration.

#	Year	Title	Release format
1	1950	Deep And Light	Parts of film available online
2	1951	California Skis	n/a
3	1952	Wandering Skis	n/a
4	1953	Ski Fantasy	n/a
5	1954	Symphony On Skis	n/a
6	1955	Invitation To Skiing	n/a
7	1956	Have Skis, Will Travel	n/a
8	1957	Anyone For Skiing?	n/a
9	1958	Are Your Skis On Straight?	n/a
10	1959	Let's Go Skiing	n/a
11	1960	Swinging Skis	n/a
12	1961	Many Moods Of Skiing	Amazon Video, iTunes, Google Play
13	1962	Around The World On Skis	n/a
14	1963	The Sound Of Skiing	n/a
15	1964	The Skiers	n/a
16	1965	The Big Ski Show	n/a
17	1966	Ski On The Wild Side	n/a
18	1967	The Ski Scene	n/a
19	1968	No Boundaries	n/a
20	1969	This Is Skiing	n/a
21	1970	Sound Of Winter	n/a
22	1971	Any Snow, Any Mountain	Amazon Video, iTunes, Google Play
23	1972	Winter People	Amazon Video, iTunes, Google Play
24	1973	Skiing's Great	n/a
25	1974	The Color Of Skiing	Amazon Video, iTunes, Google Play
26	1975	There Comes A Time	Amazon Video, iTunes, Google Play
27	1976	Skiing On My Mind	Amazon Video, iTunes, Google Play
28	1977	In Search Of Skiing	Amazon Video, iTunes, Google Play
29	1978	Ski A La Carte	Amazon Video, DVD, iTunes, Google Play
30	1979	Winter Fever	Amazon Video, iTunes, Google Play
31	1980	Ski People	Amazon Video, iTunes, Google Play
32	1981	Ski In The Sun	Amazon Video, iTunes, Google Play
33	1982	SnoWonder	Amazon Video, VHS, iTunes, Google Play
34	1983	Ski Time	Amazon Video, VHS, iTunes, Google Play
35	1984	Ski Country	Amazon Video, VHS, iTunes, Google Play
36	1985	Steep And Deep	Amazon Video, LD, VHS, DVD, iTunes, Google Play
37	1986	Beyond The Edge	Amazon Video, VHS, iTunes, Google Play
38	1987	White Winter Heat	Amazon Video, VHS, DVD, iTunes, Google Play
39	1988	Escape To Ski	Amazon Video, VHS, iTunes, Google Play
40	1989	White Magic	Amazon Video, VHS, iTunes, Google Play
41	1990	Extreme Winter	Amazon Video, LD, VHS, DVD, iTunes, Google Play
42	1991	Born To Ski	Amazon Video, VHS, iTunes, Google Play
43	1992	Steeper And Deeper	Amazon Video, VHS, iTunes, Google Play
44	1993	Black Diamond Rush	VHS, DVD, iTunes, Google Play
45	1994	Vertical Reality	Amazon Video, VHS, iTunes, Google Play
46	1995	Endless Winter	Amazon Video, LD, VHS, DVD, iTunes, Google Play
47	1996	Snowriders	Amazon Video, VHS, DVD, iTunes, Google Play
48	1997	Snowriders 2	Amazon Video, VHS, DVD, iTunes, Google Play
49	1998	Freeriders	VHS, DVD, iTunes, Google Play, Amazon Video
50	1999	Fifty	VHS, DVD, iTunes, Google Play, Amazon Video
51	2000	Ride	VHS, DVD, iTunes, Google Play, Amazon Video
52	2001	Cold Fusion	VHS, DVD, iTunes, Google Play, Amazon Video
53	2002	Storm	VHS, DVD, iTunes, Google Play, Amazon Video
54	2003	Journey	DVD, iTunes, Google Play, Amazon Video
55	2004	Impact	DVD, iTunes, Google Play, Amazon Video
56	2005	Higher Ground	DVD, iTunes, Google Play, Amazon Video
57	2006	Off The Grid	DVD, iTunes, Google Play, Amazon Video
58	2007	Playground	DVD, Blu-ray, iTunes, Google Play, Amazon Video
59	2008	Children Of Winter	DVD, Blu-ray, iTunes, Google Play, Amazon Video
60	2009	Dynasty	DVD, Blu-ray, iTunes, Google Play, Amazon Video
61	2010	Wintervention	DVD, Blu-ray, iTunes, Google Play, Amazon Video
62	2011	Like There's No Tomorrow	DVD, Blu-ray, iTunes, Google Play, Amazon Video
63	2012	Flow State	DVD, Blu-ray, * iTunes, Google Play, Amazon Video
64	2013	Ticket to Ride	DVD, Blu-ray,* iTunes, Google Play, Amazon Video
65	2014	No Turning Back	DVD, Blu-ray, iTunes, Google Play, Amazon Video
66	2015	Chasing Shadows	DVD, Blu-ray, iTunes, Google Play, Amazon Video
67	2016	Here There & Everywhere	DVD, Blu-ray, iTunes, Google Play, Amazon Video
68	2017	Line of Descent	National Film Tour, Blu-ray, iTunes, Google Play, Amazon
69	2018	Face of Winter	National Film Tour, Blu-ray, iTunes, Google Play, Amazon
70	2019	Timeless	National Film Tour, Blu-ray, iTunes, Google Play, Amazon
71	2020	Future Retro	Outside+, Amazon Video, Google Play, Vimeo, DVD, Blu-ray
72	2021	Winter Starts Now	National Film Tour, Outside+
73	2022	Daymaker	National Film Tour, Outside+
74	2023	All Time	National Film Tour, Outside+
75	2024	75	National Film Tour, Outside+
76	2025	Sno-ciety	National Film Tour, Outside+

Other Warren Miller ski films

Year	Title	Release format
1985	Learn to Ski Better	VHS
1986	Cameras In Motion	VHS
1988	How The Super Skiers Ski: Steep Leaps & Powder	VHS
1990	Extreme Skiing	VHS
1992	Ski Film Festival	VHS
1993	In Search Of Powder	VHS
1999	Learn to Ski Better 2	VHS
2004	Bloopers, Blunders and Bailouts	DVD
