= Ancillary market =

Non-theatrical market for entertainment

Ancillary markets are non-theatrical markets for feature films, like home video, television, Pay Per View, VOD, Internet streaming, airlines and others.

== History ==
Before television, studios played their films in theaters exclusively. However, in 1950 many studios began to sell all their pre-1948 features to television syndicators. The television syndicators then would use these films to fill in their programming schedules. Back in the 1960s, the first domestic ancillary market for feature films was created. NBC was the first to practice the market on September 23, 1961, by programming "NBC Saturday Night at the Movies." After such success, ABC became the second network ever to program a series of prime time features in 1962. One of the other networks, CBS, followed and added a prime time feature program in 1965.

Today, feature films opens in motion picture theaters to establish its box-office value. After that is established, it is then released to ancillary markets in a particular order as follows:

- Video and Pay Per View (PPV)
- Premium cable services such as HBO, Showtime, and Cinemax
- Cable television
- Network television
- Television syndication

The sequence is to maximize the full economic potential of each market.

== VCR ==
Home video recorders were made public when Sony introduced the half-inch Betamax cassette in 1975. Following Betamax, the company JVC introduced the Video Home System (VHS). Marketed by RCA and manufactured by Matsushita, VHS soon became known as the video-cassette recorders (VCRs). VCRs, which gave the consumer the option of recording programs from television, were a new form of competition in the demanding consumer market. VCRs revenue contributed to the development of the ancillary market of video and DVD. By the 1980s, five million households owned VCRs. Major studios had not yet adapted to the new video technologies that were being developed for consumers. There were no anticipations of new markets or other opportunities to expand until an entrepreneur, Andre Blay, opened Hollywood film companies' eyes. Blay wanted the license to transfer and sell their films on tape. After he succeeded and his approach was beneficial, film companies all around became a part of the video distribution. The film companies could not deny the fact that this new distribution would lead to a new revenue stream.

== DVD ==
As the VHS market saturated, multiple media executives and manufacturers liked the idea of utilizing other home video technologies. In 1993, the film industry upgraded their technology with the creation of several new formats including the DVD, or digital video disc. Many manufacturers such as the Japanese (Hitachi, JVC, Matsushita Electric Works, Mitsubishi, Pioneer, Sony and Toshiba) and the European (Philips and Thomson) collaborated to facilitate development of the DVD Forum. In March 1997, the US launch of the DVD systems went smoothly due to Hollywood's solidarity. Manufacturers and film studios alike together decided to avoid making the same mistake of the VHS format battles and agreed upon a universal standard of cooperation. When first introduced in 1997, DVDs sold at the low price of $20, for which they offered high-quality image and extra special features. Consumers liked the advantages of the DVDs and soon surpassed VHS sales.

== Premium television ==
The first premium rate television services were Phonevision, Telemeter, and SubscriberVision, among others. None of them were successful, until the launch of Home Box Office (HBO) in 1972, considered the first successful premium-rate subscription television service. Other services were launched: Z Channel, Showtime, The Movie Channel, Cinemax, Spotlight and Home Theater Network.

Only HBO, Showtime, The Movie Channel and Cinemax survived through the 1980s. These premium rate services air features unedited, uncut, and commercial-free, the same way they were shown on theaters and/or home video.

== Network television ==
Out of the many ancillary markets out there, none were more effective and revenue rewarding than network television, and eventually syndication began. Amanda D. Lotz spoke on the radical change in her book titled Television Will Be Revolutionized (2008). She mentions how time went on and as the post-network era developed, that the limited ways there were for medium to be distributed was eliminated. What was expanding, and evolving was network television as a whole.<Lotz 85 At first channels were few, and very limited. But soon came the multi-channel transition, then on with the creation of cable TV. As that later expended cable began to see the 'cash cow' in that and began selling shares to different networks in order to air their studio programs. Not only did Network Television open up ancillary markets for TV, but other markets as well. The VCR then became a hot commodity, because the consumer wanted the option of recording. That slowly transitioned to the DVD that took out the VCR, and finally DVR. Which seems to be just that, a VCR and a DVD combined. Network television took a gigantic step when it later allowed programs to have different showing dates, and even multiple air times. This offered different networks to still be able to ear revenue off of an older film that already has left the box office.

== Making Television Safe for Film ==
According to McDonald and Wasko, Hollywood's interest in emerging medium of television dates from the 1920s and includes experiments with the developing technology, an alternative model of television as home theater, applications for television frequencies, as well as investments in broadcasting companies that were exploring television (Anderson, 1994; Hilmes, 1990; Wasko, 1994). The evidence suggests that studios clearly wanted to control the development and implementation of television technology. Securing that control required the assistance of the Federal Communications Commission, which regulated television's development by articulating technical standards and operating rules and through the FCC's exclusive right to license the use of television frequencies for experimentation or broadcast (McDonald and Wasko, p. 107).

== Video games ==
Video games are a rapidly growing ancillary market for feature films. Video game over-all gross income has consistently surpassed that of movie sales since 2004. Because of the increased interest in video games many major media and communication companies have begun to show interest in video games as a way to market, brand, and advertise for their product. Some movies that have benefited from this are the Harry Potter, Lord of the Rings, and James Bond series. Because the video game industry has been able to outplay and outgross many movies, video game manufacturers are beginning to look in the direction of producing their own movies as well. Microsoft's producers of Halo have decided to pass Hollywood studios and produce their own movie.

Hollywood has shown interest in the video game industry as an ancillary market almost as far as video games have existed. The film industry's goal within the video game industry is to either seek control and therefore ownership of the video game market or to license products to video game producers. Once the video game profits are high, that is when Hollywood seeks control. On the other hand, when profits are down, that is when Hollywood offers the licensing. The collaboration had always been problematic since the film industry had been uncertain about the development of video games. Hollywood has seen video games as another promotional scheme for a film.

== Recorded Music ==
Hollywood has had interactions with the recorded music industry that dates back as far as the studio system itself. The interactions between the two include three main periods; 1927-1957: recorded music as a form of promotion, 1957-1977: recorded music as cross-promotion and ancillary revenue, and 1977-1997: recorded music as cross-promotion, ancillary revenue stream, and means of spreading risk. In addition to music's promotional value, studios realized that, "A chart success was an effective way of generating additional revenue for their companies, both in terms of publishing and performance royalties and, of course, in outright sales." Recorded music proved to be of great value as an ancillary market to the film industry.
