= History of Disney Channel =

Historical timeline of Disney Channel

Logo used since February 1, 2025

Disney Channel is an American pay television channel that serves as the flagship property of Disney Kids & Family, a unit of Disney Entertainment Television, the television section of the Disney Entertainment business segment of the Walt Disney Company.

== 1977–1983: Origins ==
In the mid-1970s, Walt Disney Productions executive Jim Jimirro proposed the idea of a cable television network that would feature television and film material from the studio. Since the company was focusing on the development of the Epcot Center at Walt Disney World, Disney chairman Card Walker rejected the proposal. Instead, they made a deal with HBO to air a select number of Disney films, cartoons, and specials, including a live production of Snow White and the Seven Dwarfs at Radio City Music Hall. However, Disney revived the idea in November 1981, entering into a partnership with the satellite unit of Group W (which had sold its 50% ownership stake in one of The Disney Channel's early rivals, Showtime, to Viacom around the same time); however, Group W would disassociate from the intended joint venture that September, due to disagreements over the channel's creative control and financial obligations that would have required Group W to pay a 50% share of the channel's start-up costs.

Despite Group W's withdrawal, The Disney Channel continued on with its development, now solely under the oversight of Walt Disney Productions, and under the leadership of the channel's first president Alan Wagner, Walt Disney Productions formally announced the launch of its family-oriented cable channel in early 1983. Disney later invested US$11 million to acquiring space on two transponders of the Hughes Communications satellite Galaxy 1, and spent US$20 million on purchasing and developing programming. The concept of a premium service aimed at a family audience, which Walt Disney Productions would choose to develop The Disney Channel as, had first been attempted by HBO, which launched Take 2 in 1979 (the service, which was HBO's first attempt at a spin-off niche service (predating Cinemax's launch in August 1980), would shut down after only a few months on the air), and was followed by the 1981 launch of the Group W-owned Home Theater Network (which was the only premium channel that strictly competed with The Disney Channel for that demographic for much of the 1980s, until the 1987 launch of Festival).

== 1983–1990: As a premium channel ==
The Disney Channel logo from April 18, 1983 to May 1986

The Disney Channel launched nationally as a premium channel on April 18, 1983, at 7:00 a.m. Eastern Time. The first program to air on the channel was also its first original series, Good Morning, Mickey!, which presented Disney animated shorts. At the time of its launch, The Disney Channel's programming aired for sixteen hours each day from 7:00 a.m. to 11:00 p.m. Eastern and Pacific Time (comparatively, its competitors HBO, Cinemax, Showtime, The Movie Channel and Spotlight all had been operating on 24-hour programming schedules for a few years at the time). By the fall of 1983, the channel was available to more than 532,000 subscribers in the United States; this total would increase to 611,000 subscribers in December of that year.

For its subscribers, the channel provided a monthly (and later bi-monthly) program guide/magazine called The Disney Channel Magazine, which in addition to carrying listings for the channel's programming, had also carried feature stories on then-upcoming programs (the magazine also lent its name to a series of interstitials seen during promotional breaks on the channel that provided behind-the-scenes looks at programming). The Disney Channel Magazine was discontinued in early 1997 and was replaced by Behind the Ears (a print magazine which also shared its name with another series of behind-the-scenes interstitials that aired on the channel from 1997 to 2000) as the channel began primarily operating as a commercial-free basic channel.

As a premium channel, The Disney Channel often ran free previews of five days to one week in length four times annually, as well as two periodic weekend-only previews (with ads targeted to cable and satellite customers who were not subscribers to the channel); this resulted in The Disney Channel offering more preview events each calendar year during its tenure as a pay service than HBO, Cinemax and Showtime had run during that timeframe. On April 1, 1984, the channel extended its daily programming to nineteen hours (from 6:00 a.m. to 1:00 a.m. Eastern and Pacific Time), with the addition of three hours onto its late night schedule. On December 7, 1986, The Disney Channel began broadcasting 24 hours a day.

By September 1983, The Disney Channel was available on cable providers in all 50 U.S. states. In October 1983, the channel premiered its first made-for-cable movie, Tiger Town, which won a CableACE Award. The first "classic" Disney animated film to be broadcast on the channel, Alice in Wonderland, premiered on the network in January 1984. That year, The Disney Channel entered into a partnership with Walt Disney Telecommunications and Non-Theatrical Company to produce foreign versions of the channel on videocassette, showing segments from the pay cable service, at a two-hour running time. By January 1985, the channel's programming reached 1.75 million subscribers, at which time the channel had reached profitability.

The Disney Channel logo from May 1986 to April 6, 1997

Starting in 1986, Colossal Pictures produced on-air identification bumpers featuring Mickey Mouse (his gloved hands, and sometimes his feet, only visible) and the logo, either animated or live action.

In August 1989, the channel launched a series of interstitial segments called The Disney Channel Salutes The American Teacher; the channel subsequently began telecasting the American Teacher Awards in November 1991. By January 1990, The Disney Channel had about five million subscribers nationwide. In May of that year, The Disney Channel won its first Daytime Emmy Awards for the original made-for-cable film Looking for Miracles, the documentary Calgary '88: 16 Days of Glory, and the special A Conversation with... George Burns, as well as its first Peabody Award for the television film Mother Goose Rock 'n' Rhyme.

== 1990–1997: As a hybrid premium/basic channel ==
On September 1, 1990, TCI's Montgomery, Alabama, system became the first cable provider to carry the channel as a basic cable service. In 1991, eight additional cable providers volunteered to move the channel to their expanded basic cable tiers, with the first to make the transition (as a test run) being Jones Intercable's systems in Fort Myers and Broward County, Florida. Other cable providers eventually began moving the channel to their basic tiers, either experimentally or on a full-time basis. Even as major providers such as Cox Communications and Marcus Cable began offering The Disney Channel on their basic tiers, executives for The Walt Disney Company denied that the channel had plans to convert into an ad-supported basic service, stating that the move from premium to basic cable on some systems was part of a five-year "hybrid" strategy that allowed providers to offer the channel in either form.

In 1991, The Disney Channel tested a two-channel multiplex service on two cable systems. HBO, Cinemax and Showtime also launched their own multiplex services that same year. However, The Disney Channel would not launch its own multiplex service permanently, unlike the others. By 1992, a third of the channel's subscriber base were estimated by Nielsen Media Research to be adults who did not have children; and by 1995, its subscriber base expanded to 15 million cable homes, eight million of which paid an additional monthly fee to receive the channel.

In March 1992, the channel debuted the original children's program Adventures in Wonderland, a contemporary live-action adaption of Alice in Wonderland (which, in turn, was based on the novel Alice Through the Looking-Glass). In September 1992, the channel began carrying the Disney's Young Musicians Symphony Orchestra series of specials, which aired annually until 1998. In honor of its 10th anniversary, the channel embarked on a 14-city nationwide bus tour starting in April 1993. By January 1995, The Disney Channel was available to 12.6 million subscribers; the period from 1994 to 1995 saw the largest yearly subscriber increase with 4.87 million households with cable television adding the channel. In March 1995, the first international Disney Channel service was launched in Taiwan. That year, the documentary Anne Frank Remembered premiered on the channel; that film would win an Academy Award for Best Documentary in 1996.

In 1996, veteran cable executive Anne Sweeney was appointed to oversee The Disney Channel as its president; that September as the launch of Disney Channel service in Southeast Asia, the channel began offering a film in primetime each night starting at 7:00 p.m. Eastern Time, with the expansion of the Sunday Magical World of Disney film block to Monday through Saturday nights; the new primetime schedule launched in September with the pay cable premiere of The Lion King.

== 1997–2001: Zoog era and first live-action originals ==
On April 6, 1997, The Disney Channel underwent a significant rebranding, shortening its name to just "Disney Channel" (though the channel was typically referred to simply as "Disney" in on-air promotions and network identifications until September 2002) and introducing a new logo designed by Lee Hunt Associates (a black Mickey ear-shaped television set; though with the introduction of a new graphics package for on-air promotions and IDs during the channel's daytime and evening lineup in 2000, the TV's patterning often varied; early versions of the logo featured people and animated characters appearing within the TV set element of the logo such as a 1930s-era Mickey Mouse). The rebranding coincided with the cable television premiere of Pocahontas.

Disney Channel continued to transition from a premium service into a basic cable channel around this time, albeit with a similar programming format to the one it carried as a full-fledged pay service. However, Disney Channel began shifting its target audience more toward children (but continued to cater to family audiences at night), as it decreased the amount of older films it aired, and its music programming (such as Disney Channel in Concert) shifted focus towards the pre-teen and teenage demographic, incorporating music videos and revamping its concert specials to feature younger musicians popular with that demographic.

Disney Channel initially continued to offer free preview events for pay television providers that continued to carry it as a premium service, but discontinued them altogether within three years of the rebrand. Although many providers still required subscribers to pay an additional monthly fee to view the channel at the time of its decision to incorporate them, Disney Channel also began to air break interruptions within shows, featuring promotions for the channel's programs as well as for feature film and home video releases from Disney. By March 1998, the channel was available to 35 million cable subscribers.

Disney Channel's programming would eventually be split into three distinct blocks: a preschool block (rebranded as Playhouse Disney on February 1, 1999), Vault Disney, and Zoog Disney. The preschool block's first series to reach wide popularity, Bear in the Big Blue House, premiered in October 1997, and was named by TV Guide as one of the "top 10 new shows for kids". Vault Disney debuted as a Sunday-only nighttime block in September 1997, and featured older Disney programs such as Zorro, The Mickey Mouse Club and the Walt Disney anthology television series, as well as older television specials and feature films.

Zoog Disney was introduced in August 1998, and was the most distinct of the three blocks, compromising Disney Channel Original Series aimed at preteens and teens. The afternoon-to-late evening lineup was hosted by anthropomorphic robot/alien hybrid characters called the "Zoogs" (who were originally two-dimensional figures, but were redesigned as cel shaded anime-esque figures and given mature voices in 2000) and was designed to encourage viewer interactivity between television and the internet. The Zoog Disney brand would later expand, with most of the channel's weekend schedule (outside of Vault Disney and Playhouse Disney) becoming part of the "Zoog Weekendz" umbrella block from June 2000 to August 2002.

Original programming on Disney Channel began to increase during this period starting with the sitcom Flash Forward, and would increase in the following years with shows like The Famous Jett Jackson in 1998 and So Weird in 1999, and into the early 2000s with Lizzie McGuire, whose star Hilary Duff became the first lead performer in one of the channel's original series to cross over into music through a record deal with co-owned music label Hollywood Records.

In 1999, Disney Channel placed a mandate to cable operators that continued to carry it as a premium service to move the channel to a basic cable tier or stop carrying it altogether, stipulating that it would not renew carriage agreements with providers (such as Time Warner Cable and Comcast, the last major cable providers to carry the channel as a pay service) that chose to continue offering the network as a premium channel. Starz acquired first-run premium television rights to live-action Walt Disney Pictures films in 1999; animated films between 1999 and 2002 were made available to pay-per-view for the first time, and some later made their post-PPV premiere during ABC's The Wonderful World of Disney program. Starz broadcast both Disney's animated and live-action films released between 2003 and 2015.

With the shift towards children as its target audience, some of the off-network programs acquired by the channel during the early-mid 2000s (such as Boy Meets World and later Sister, Sister) began to be edited for content such as profanity and sexual references that were deemed inappropriate for younger audiences. The music videos and concert specials that Disney Channel had been airing since the 1997 rebrand were removed by this time, citing the inability to obtain revenue from the artists' CD sales and non-exclusivity for the videos; soon after, Disney Channel began featuring music videos from artists signed to Disney's in-house record labels Hollywood Records and Walt Disney Records, and songs featured in Disney-produced feature films.

== 2001–2006: First animated originals, basic cable rebrand, and growing popularity ==
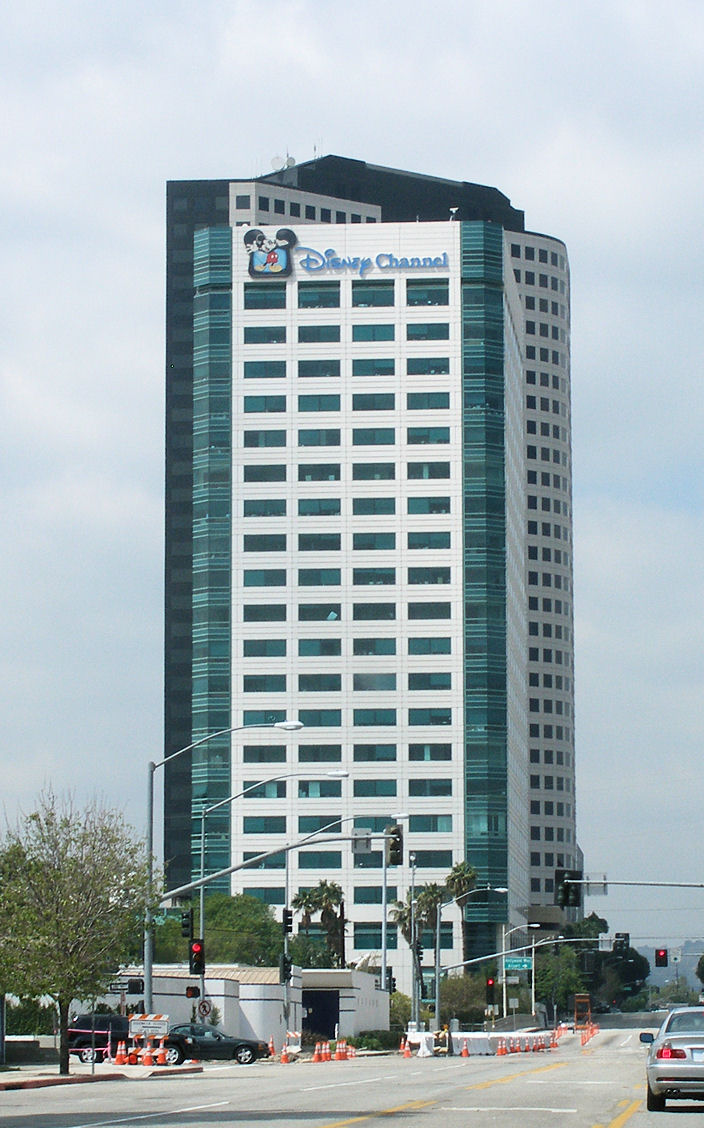
Disney Channel's headquarters in Burbank, California, as it appeared in the 2000s (the logo was later removed instead of being replaced with the 2002-era logo)

By April 2001, Disney Channel was available to approximately 70 million cable and satellite subscribers, largely consisting of those who had already received the channel through basic cable, as well as the remnants of its pay subscriber base. The Proud Family debuted as the channel's first exclusive original animated series. The following year, Disney Channel's next animated original series Kim Possible became the channel's first series to debut at number 1 in the US.

By May 2002, Disney Channel was available in 80 million cable homes nationwide. In late September of that year, Disney Channel began a gradual rebranding, beginning with the discontinuation of the "Zoog" brand from on-air use (though Zoog Disney would continue as a separate website until 2003, when the site's content was consolidated onto Disney Channel's primary website, DisneyChannel.com).

On September 9, the Vault Disney overnight block was replaced by same-day repeats of the channel's original and acquired programs, primarily to contribute to the network's then-upcoming "hip" image. The block's removal resulted in Disney Channel not featuring programs aimed at adults for the first time in its history, with the channel's primetime feature films becoming the only programs that intentionally targeted a broader family audience. As of 2015, Disney Channel is the only major American cable channel aimed at children that does not directly maintain a dual audience of both children and adults (Nickelodeon and Cartoon Network each feature nighttime programming for families or adults). Movies shown during prime time were also reduced from an average of two to three features to only one each night of the week. The channel removed reality and scripted drama series from its original programming slate, while substantially increasing the channel's reliance on live-action sitcoms and animated series.

Disney Channel logo from September 30, 2002 to May 7, 2010, used in tandem with the 2010 logo from May 7, 2010 to May 23, 2014

On September 30, 2002, Disney Channel introduced a new on-air logo designed by CA Square (using an outline of Mickey Mouse's head as its centerpiece) that would later be adopted by its international sister channels in November 2002, and unveiled a new graphical design to fit the network's new look, as well as a four-note mnemonic jingle composed by Alex Lasarenko. The Playhouse Disney block also revised its existing branding and introduced new interstitial series the same day. Starting on June 1, 2003, the channel began using a series of bumpers that are still used to this day, although with the updated logo, primarily featuring actors and animated characters from its original programs (and occasionally from Disney's theatrical releases) drawing the channel's logo using a wand (in actuality, a glowstick). Dubbed a "Wand ID" by fans, the celebrity introduces themselves and the show they appeared on, and says "...and you're watching Disney Channel", then draws the shape of the channel's logo. Around this time, Disney Channel's original series began airing as part of corporate sister ABC's Saturday morning children's program block; most of the shows that began airing on the block in 2006 would remain on the network until September 3, 2011, when it was replaced by the Litton Entertainment-produced block Weekend Adventure.

In 2003, Disney Channel premiered its first ever made-for-cable musical film, The Cheetah Girls, which received a worldwide audience of 84 million viewers. In 2005, That's So Raven (which premiered in January 2003) became the channel's highest-rated series since its transition to basic cable as well as becoming the first original series to run longer than 65 episodes, breaking a highly controversial rule that was implemented in 1998, aimed at limiting increases in production costs for its original programming (the 65-episode rule is no longer enforced, although most series are now usually discontinued after their fourth season at maximum), Raven eventually became the channel's longest-running original series at 100 episodes and the first to spawn a spin-off series (Cory in the House). The Suite Life of Zack & Cody premiered in March 2005, and also became a success for the channel, while American Dragon: Jake Long premiered earlier in January 2005.

== 2006–2014: Focus on original series and strong ratings ==
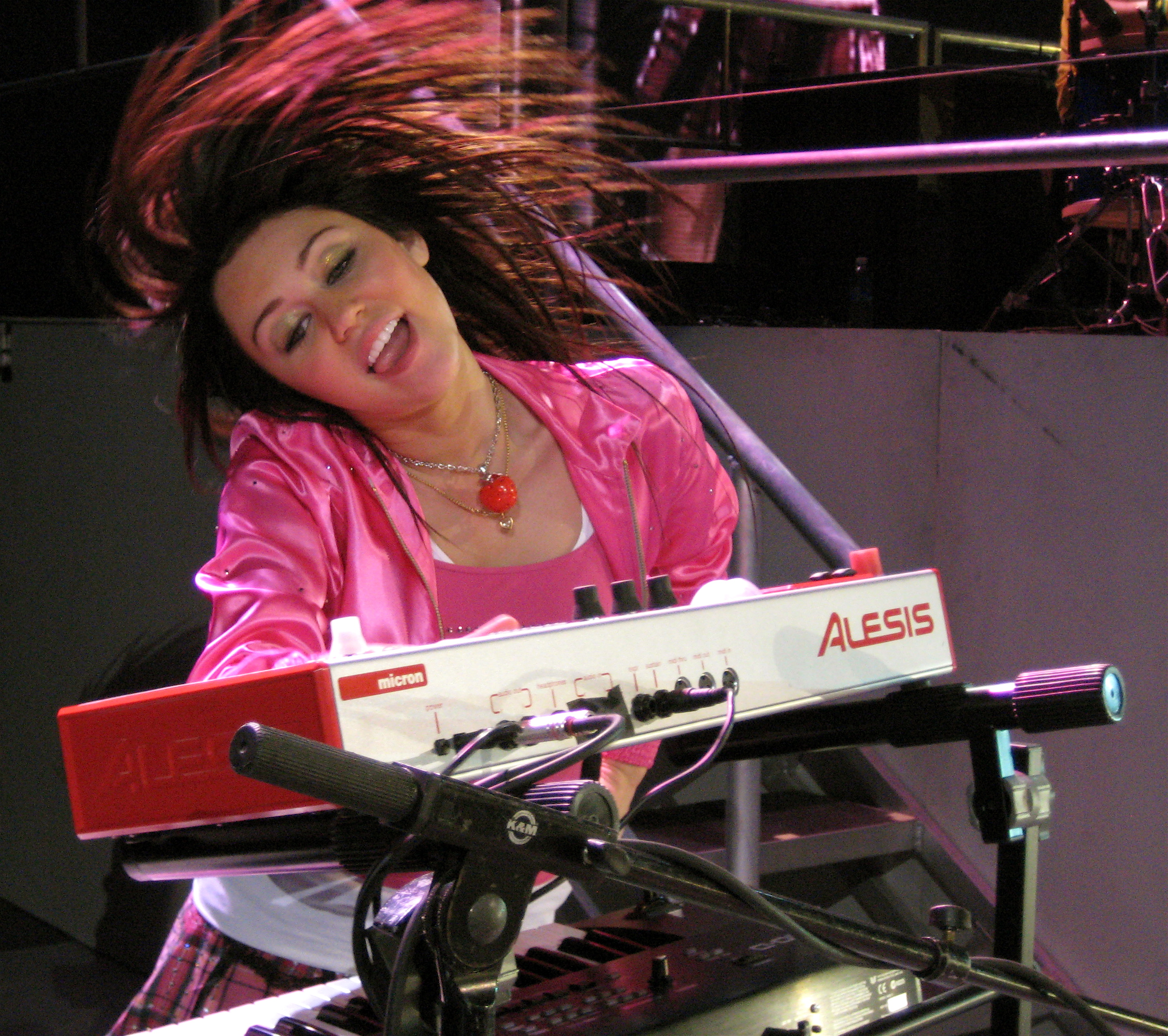
The channel began popularizing teen music stars, such as Miley Cyrus in the series Hannah Montana

The earlier success of The Cheetah Girls led to the creation of other music-themed original programming: In 2006, both the original movie High School Musical (on January 20) and the series Hannah Montana (on March 24) premiered, the latter of which launched the career of its star Miley Cyrus (who starred opposite her father, country singer Billy Ray Cyrus, in the series). On July 28 of that year, the channel saw the debut of its first multiple-series crossover, That's So Suite Life of Hannah Montana (which involved That's So Raven, The Suite Life of Zack & Cody and Hannah Montana). Anne Sweeney, president of Disney–ABC Television Group, ultimately helped to remake Disney Channel into "the major profit driver in the company" by the end of the decade as the channel made major inroads in increasing its overall viewership, while in turn using a strategy, which proved successful, to discover, nurture and aggressively cross-promote teen music stars whose style and image were carefully targeted to the pre-teen and teenage demographic (a strategy that has been de-emphasized in the 2010s). Around that time, as Disney Channel's intended target audience began ranging from preschoolers to young adolescents, the channel began to add viewers outside this target demographic, creating increased competition with Viacom-owned Nickelodeon.

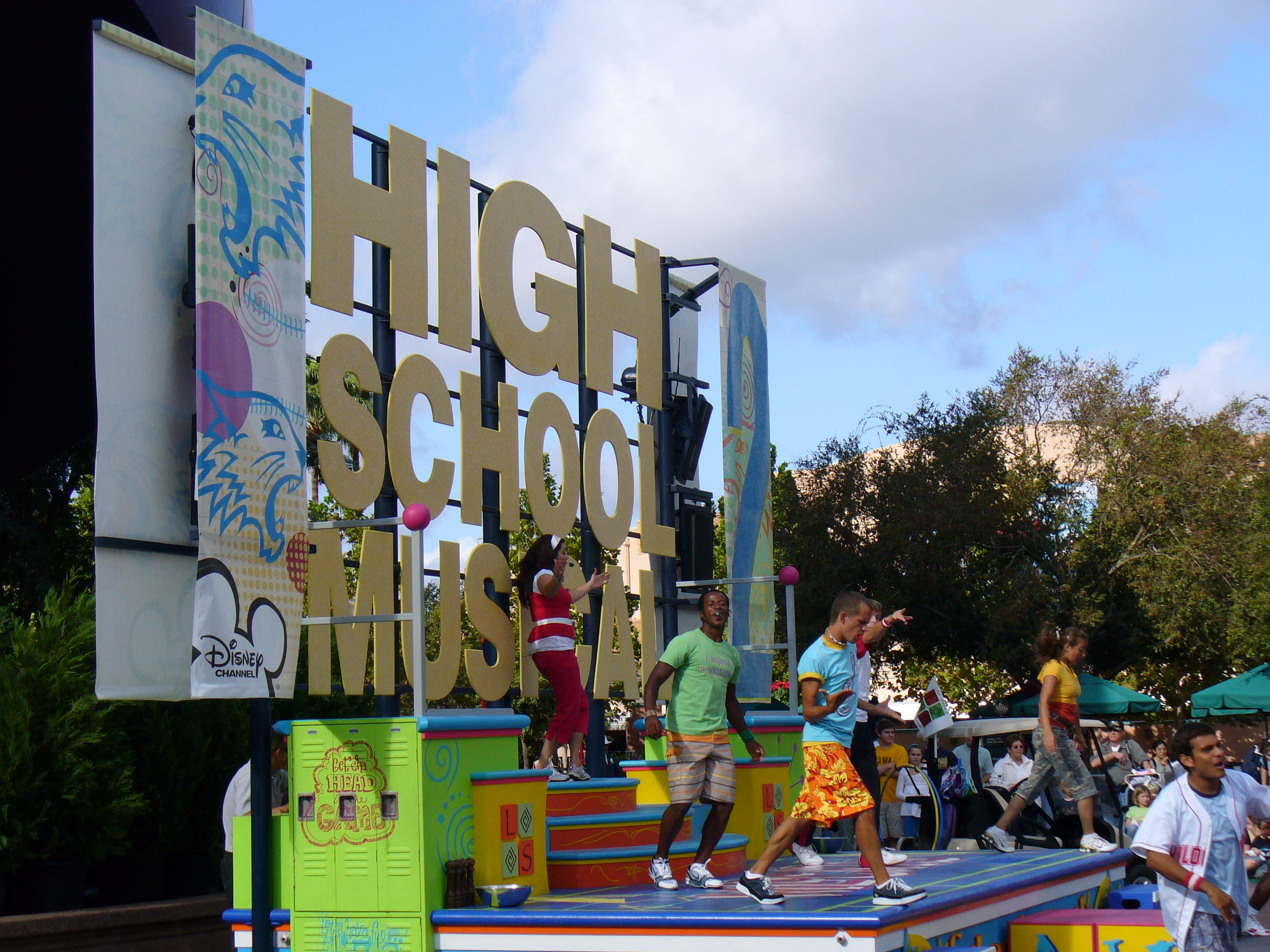
High School Musical 2 became the highest-rated non-sports program in the history of basic cable in 2007

Disney Channel logo from May 7, 2010 to May 23, 2014

In 2007, the channel began removing most of its acquired programs, and also began to incorporate rotating hour-long blocks of its original series and other programs during the daytime hours. It also moved first-run episodes of its original series on weekends from late afternoon/early evening into primetime. In addition, the channel began putting less emphasis on its animated series, moving some of them from primetime to graveyard slots, while substantially increasing its reliance on teen-oriented sitcoms. Despite this, Phineas and Ferb, the first long-form original series to be broadcast in HD, premiered to popularity that year. On April 2, 2008, Disney Channel launched a high-definition simulcast of the network.

Two other series premiered that year: the That's So Raven spin-off Cory in the House (which ended after two seasons) and the more successful Wizards of Waverly Place (which surpassed That's So Raven in October 2011 to become Disney Channel's longest-running original series, and ending its run in January 2012 at 106 episodes). High School Musical 2 premiered on August 17 of that year, becoming the highest-rated non-sports program in the history of basic cable and the highest-rated made-for-cable movie premiere on record (as well as the highest-rated television program, broadcast or cable, of summer 2007) with 17.2 million viewers.

In 2008, The Suite Life of Zack & Cody spin-off The Suite Life on Deck (which became the number 1 series among children between ages of 6- and 12-years-old in 2008) premiered, along with two more music-based original made-for-cable movies: Camp Rock and The Cheetah Girls: One World.

Capitalizing on the rising star status of the Jonas Brothers and Demi Lovato following Camp Rock, two series respectively starring both acts premiered in 2009: Jonas (which was renamed Jonas L.A. for its second season before being canceled) and Sonny with a Chance (Lovato also co-starred in the original movie Princess Protection Program, which premiered in June). The August debut of the original film Wizards of Waverly Place: The Movie became the highest-rated cable program of 2009 (excluding sporting events), premiering to 11.4 million viewers and ranking as the second highest-rated original movie premiere in Disney Channel's history, behind High School Musical 2. A one-hour Wizards reunion special, The Wizards Return: Alex vs. Alex would later premiere in March 2013, along with a sequel series in October 2024. The July 17 premiere of the Wizards/Suite Life on Deck/Hannah Montana crossover special Wizards on Deck with Hannah Montana also defeated its cable and broadcast competition that night with 9.1 million viewers (effectively making the Wizards and On Deck episodes featured in the special the highest-rated episodes of both series at that point). Disney Channel also began airing Have a Laugh! shorts as a way to introduce viewers to Disney's classic characters; the program was discontinued in 2013, in favor of the Mickey Mouse short series.

On May 7, 2010, Disney Channel updated its on-air look and began using a modified version of the 2002 logo, which originally was introduced a month earlier in bumpers and promos for weekend evening programming. The Mickey Mouse head silhouette is inside a box resembling a smartphone application icon. The year saw the debuts of Good Luck Charlie, Fish Hooks, and Shake It Up. On November 19, 2010, Disney Channel began offering an alternate Spanish-language audio feed (carried either as a separate second audio program track or sold by cable and satellite providers in the form of a separate channel that is part of a Spanish-language programming package).

Sonny with a Chance was retooled for its third season as So Random!, focusing on the show within the show, after Demi Lovato decided not to return to the series to focus on her music career. In 2011, Disney Channel experienced a transitional period for its live action sitcoms, as Hannah Montana and The Suite Life on Deck ended production, Wizards of Waverly Place commencing its final season, and A.N.T. Farm , Jessie, Austin & Ally and PrankStars premiered. On February 14, 2011, the Playhouse Disney block was rebranded as Disney Junior on Disney Channel.

In 2012, Gravity Falls and Dog with a Blog premiered, with the former being critically acclaimed, and the latter received mixed reviews. Disney Channel that year ended Nickelodeon's 17-year run as the highest-rated cable channel in the United States, placing its first ever win in total-day viewership among all cable networks as measured by ACNielsen. On July 14, 2012, Disney Channel announced its first television collaboration with Marvel Entertainment (which was acquired by The Walt Disney Company in 2009), in the form of the crossover special Phineas and Ferb: Mission Marvel featuring characters from Phineas and Ferb and the Marvel Universe. On March 22, 2012, a 24/7 Disney Junior channel was launched.

== 2014–2020: New logo era ==
In February 2014, Gravity Falls and Wander Over Yonder moved from Disney Channel to Disney XD but still aired episodes on Disney Channel as part of the "Disney XD on Disney Channel" block, (after early 2015, however, Wander Over Yonder was removed from the Disney Channel schedule, and fully became a Disney XD original series) while it was announced that Phineas and Ferb and Fish Hooks would end after completing its respective fourth and third seasons (the former would later be revived in June 2025).

Disney Channel logo from May 23, 2014 to March 24, 2017, used in tandem with the 2017 and 2019 logos from March 24, 2017 to February 1, 2025

On May 23, 2014, Disney Channel completely changed its logo for the first time in over eleven years, in which the new logo incorporates the ears moved on to the "i" of "Disney" and the Disney logo in the Walt Disney font. Also, the "smartphone application icon" was removed, while two circles were added to the left and right of the dot of the "i", and the stylized Mickey Mouse head shape was discontinued. The early normal lowercase "i" version without the Mickey ears on the dot of the "i" of this logo was first used earlier in Germany on January 17. Alongside the redesign of the logo, the network launched a new graphical design for its idents and promos which were also first used in Germany earlier in January.

In 2015, the Disney Channel original movie Descendants was viewed by 6.6 million people on its premiere night and eventually became the fifth most-watched original movie in cable history, which spawned a new franchise for the channel.

On February 14, 2016, after the channel's premiere of the 2013 animated film Frozen, Disney Channel aired a preview of the single-camera sitcom Stuck in the Middle, the first Disney Channel series which all of the main characters are Hispanic. On June 24, Disney Channel premiered its 100th DCOM, Adventures in Babysitting, followed by the premiere of new series, Bizaardvark. Prior to the premiere, Disney Channel aired the "100th DCOM Celebration" which began on May 27, 2016 with a four-day marathon of the 51 most popular DCOMs followed by encore presentations of these and every other DCOM ever made through June 2016. The movies would be seen on Disney Channel, the Disney Channel app and VOD through summer 2016.

On July 22, 2016, Disney premiered an animated series Elena of Avalor, a spin-off of the Disney Junior series Sofia the First and the first long-form original cartoon on the network since Wander Over Yonder in 2013. In August, Variety announced that a new single-camera series titled Andi Mack would start production in the fall for a 2017 premiere; the show would also be the first on the network to be aimed at Asian Americans.

Disney Channel logo from March 24, 2017 to January 25, 2019

Meanwhile, Tangled: The Series (later retitled Rapunzel's Tangled Adventure), a spin-off of the 2010 film Tangled, first premiered with a precursor television film on March 10, 2017 before regular episodes began airing on March 24. The premiere of Tangled: The Series also coincided with the debut of Disney Channel's graphic redesign with a flattened version of the previous logo. Alongside the introduction of its revised logo, it also introduced new graphic designs for its idents and promos, this time utilizing flat design tropes. The That's So Raven spin-off Raven's Home would debut immediately after the premiere of Descendants 2, on July 21.

In 2018, Disney Channel fully returned to animated programming; in February, the network ordered production on Amphibia and The Owl House while also reporting their intent to premiere first-run episodes from the fourth season of Star vs. the Forces of Evil. Additional press releases in the following months saw Disney XD originals DuckTales, Big Hero 6: The Series, Milo Murphy's Law, and the then-upcoming Big City Greens move over to Disney Channel for their premieres.

== 2020–present: Decline in the cord-cutting era ==
Disney Channel logo from January 25, 2019 to February 1, 2025

Starting on January 6, 2020, Disney Channel went completely commercial-free on weeknights and weekend mornings. This move saw the removal of most pre-show wand IDs, while promos for new episodes and movies avoided showing a given time for the premiere. Disney Channel largely returned to half-hour series timeslots with commercials throughout 2021.

Throughout 2020, Disney Channel lost 33% of cable viewers due to the success of Disney+, resulting in various channels shutting down worldwide outside the US.

On January 15, 2021, a Disney Channel Original Series reached a fifth season for the first time with the season five premiere of Bunk'd, followed by the premiere of Disney Channel's first horror series Secrets of Sulphur Springs.

On July 15, 2022, Zombies 3 was released on Disney+, the first Disney Channel Original Movie to do so, with its cable premiere following a month later on August 12.

On March 14, 2023, Disney Channel presented an alternate telecast of an NHL game produced by ESPN. This marked the first ever live sporting event for the network. The traditional telecast aired on ESPN. The simulcast returned in 2024, although the traditional telecast aired on ABC.

Disney Channel's average viewership had declined from two million viewers in 2014 to a mere 132,000 in 2023. In spite of the ratings decline, the American entertainment industry was continuing to benefit from Disney Channel's legacy, as the Generation Z stars Sabrina Carpenter, Olivia Rodrigo, and Jenna Ortega had all begun or greatly advanced their careers on Disney Channel sitcoms.

On September 30, 2024, Disney Channel introduced a brand new logo for the first time in ten years. The new logo solely incorporates Disney's corporate logo (and for the first time in its 40-year history did not incorporate the Mickey Mouse head shape directly on the logo) with the word "channel" in a more standardized font. The new rebranding officially debuted on February 1, 2025, alongside a new set of graphics.

== Bibliography ==
- Flower, Joe (1991). Prince of the Magic Kingdom: Michael Eisner and the Re-Making of Disney. John Wiley & Sons. ISBN 0-471-52465-4.
- Grover, Ron (1991). The Disney Touch: How a Daring Management Team Revived an Entertainment Empire. Business One Irwin. ISBN 1-55623-385-X.
