= 1972 in American television =

This is a list of American television-related events in 1972.

== Events ==
| Date | Event | Ref. |
|---|---|---|
| January 21 | The first convention of Star Trek fans is held at the Statler-Hilton Hotel in New York City. | |
| March 18 | After losing a 15-year court battle over the legality of its business relationship with The Herald-Traveler, CBS' Boston, Massachusetts affiliate WHDH-TV Channel 5 signs off the air after the movie Fixed Bayonets! finished at 1 am. At 3 a.m. on March 19, WCVB takes over the Channel 5 frequency, simultaneously switching affiliations to the ABC network following CBS' loss of interest in the channel during the long legal wrangle. The CBS affiliation returned to WNAC-TV until its 1982 shutdown. | |
| May | The Tonight Show Starring Johnny Carson relocates from New York City to the NBC Studios in Burbank, California. It would return to New York in 2014 when The Tonight Show Starring Jimmy Fallon is launched. | |
| August 26 | Effective with this issue, TV Guide discontinues the practice of using a "C" to indicate color programs, and instead starts using a "BW" for monochrome, saving a lot of printer's ink in the process. At the time about half of the TV households in the U.S. had color sets. | |
| September 4 | The Price Is Right premieres on CBS. As of 2026, it is the longest-running game show on American television. | |
| September 17 | M*A*S*H airs its first episode, on CBS. The series will run for 11 seasons, until the end of February 1983. | |
| October 1 | The famous Move Closer to Your World theme makes its debut on WPVI-TV in Philadelphia. | |
| November 8 | Home Box Office (HBO) launches at 7:30 p.m. Eastern Time, initially available to subscribers of Teleservice Cable (now Service Electric Cable TV and Communications) in Wilkes-Barre, Pennsylvania. HBO's inaugural program and event telecast, a National Hockey League (NHL) game between the New York Rangers and the Vancouver Canucks from Madison Square Garden, is transmitted that evening over channel 21—its original assigned channel on the Teleservice system—to its initial base of 365 subscribers in Wilkes-Barre. The first movie presentation shown on the service airs immediately after the hockey game concludes: the 1971 film Sometimes a Great Notion, starring Paul Newman and Henry Fonda. | |
| December 31 | The first installment of Dick Clark's New Year's Rockin' Eve airs on NBC, beginning a yearly tradition of Dick Clark-hosted New Year's specials. | |

== Programs ==
=== Debuts ===
| Date | Debut | Network |
|---|---|---|
| January 13 | Me and the Chimp | CBS |
| January 14 | Sanford and Son | NBC |
| January 15 | Emergency! | NBC |
| June 21 | The Super | ABC |
| September 4 | Gambit | CBS |
| September 4 | The Joker's Wild | CBS |
| September 4 | The New Price is Right | CBS |
| September 9 | Runaround | NBC |
| September 9 | The New Scooby-Doo Movies | CBS |
| September 9 | Fat Albert and the Cosby Kids | CBS |
| September 11 | The Rookies | ABC |
| September 12 | Maude | CBS |
| September 12 | Temperatures Rising | ABC |
| September 13 | The Julie Andrews Hour | ABC |
| September 14 | The Waltons | CBS |
| September 15 | Ghost Story | NBC |
| September 16 | Bridget Loves Bernie | CBS |
| September 16 | The Bob Newhart Show | CBS |
| September 16 | The Streets of San Francisco | ABC |
| September 17 | M*A*S*H | CBS |
| October 3 | 4 Country Reporter | KDFW |
| October 14 | Kung Fu | ABC |
| November 4 | Great Performances | PBS |
| December 10 | The Moonstone | PBS |

=== Ending this year ===
| Date | Show | Debut |
|---|---|---|
| January 1 | The Funky Phantom | 1971 |
| January 8 | Help!... It's the Hair Bear Bunch! | 1971 |
| March 1 | The Courtship of Eddie's Father | 1969 |
| March 10 | O'Hara, U.S. Treasury | 1971 |
| March 12 | The Jimmy Stewart Show | 1971 |
| March 25 | Bewitched | 1964 |
| March 31 | Bright Promise | 1969 |
| April 13 | My Three Sons | 1960 |
| April 27 | Me and the Chimp | 1972 |
| August 23 | The Super | 1972 |
| September 2 | The Road Runner Show | 1966 |
| December 23 | Josie and the Pussycats | 1970 |

=== TV movies and miniseries ===
- September 19: The Woman Hunter (CBS)

== Networks and services ==
=== Network launches ===
| Network | Type | Launch date | Notes | Source |
|---|---|---|---|---|
| Family Broadcasting Corporation | Cable | Unknown | | |
| Home Box Office | Cable | November 8 | First ever premium movie channel created by Time Life; oldest pay television service in the United States | |

== Television stations ==
=== Sign-ons ===
| Date | City of License/Market | Station | Channel | Affiliation | Notes/Ref. |
|---|---|---|---|---|---|
| January 1 | Aberdeen, South Dakota | KDSD-TV | 16 | PBS via SDPB | |
| January 4 | Chattanooga, Tennessee | WRIP-TV | 61 | Independent | |
| January 14 | Bude, Mississippi | WMAU-TV | 17 | PBS | Part of Mississippi ETV |
| January 14 | Meridian, Mississippi | WMAW-TV | 14 | PBS | Part of Mississippi ETV |
| February 14 | Fort Lauderdale-Miami, Florida | WSCV | 51 | Independent | Previously on-air as WSMS-TV (1969-1970) |
| March 8 | Dayton, Ohio | WPTD | 16 | PBS | |
| March 19 | Boston, Massachusetts | WCVB-TV | 5 | ABC | |
| May 7 | Greenville/Washington, North Carolina | WUNK-TV | 25 | PBS via UNC-TV | |
| May 19 | Oxford, Mississippi (Memphis, Tennessee) | WMAV-TV | 18 | NET | Part of Mississippi ETV |
| August 16 | Los Angeles, California | KBSA | 46 | Independent | |
| August 29 | Charlotte Amalie, U.S. Virgin Islands | WTJX-TV | 12 | PBS | |
| September 12 | Green Bay, Wisconsin | WPNE-TV | 38 | PBS | Part of Wisconsin Public Television |
| September 14 | Bethel, Alaska | KYUK-TV | | PBS | Part of AlaskaOne |
| September 15 | Greenwood, Mississippi | WMAO-TV | 23 | PBS | Part of Mississippi ETV |
| October 16 | Corpus Christi, Texas | KEDT | 16 | PBS | |
| October 20 | Farmington, New Mexico | KOBF | 12 | NBC | Satellite of KOB-TV/Albuquerque, New Mexico |
| October 23 | Camden, New Jersey (Philadelphia, Pennsylvania) | WNJS | 23 | PBS | Part of the New Jersey Network |
| October 29 | Greenville, South Carolina | WGGS | 16 | Religious independent | |
| November 20 | Huntington Beach, California/Los Angeles, California | KOCE-TV | 50 | PBS | |
| December 17 | Grand Rapids, Michigan | WGVC | 11 | PBS | |
| December 28 | Marquette, Michigan | WNMU-TV | | PBS | |
| Unknown date | Bethel, Alaska | KYUK-TV | 4 | PBS | Eventual AlaskaOne station |
| Unknown date | Hanford/Fresno, California | KFTV | 21 | SIN | |

=== Network affiliation changes ===
| Date | City of license/Market | Station | Channel | Old affiliation | New affiliation | Notes/Ref. |
|---|---|---|---|---|---|---|
| March 19 | Boston, Massachusetts | WNAC-TV | 7 | ABC | CBS | Now defunct |
| March 23 | Meridian, Mississippi | WHTV | 24 | Silent | NBC | Became a satellite of WTVA/Tupelo, Mississippi until becoming a CBS affiliate in 1980. |
| March 23 | Meridian, Mississippi | WTOK-TV | 11 | CBS (primary); NBC (secondary) | CBS (exclusive) | Now an ABC affiliate |

=== Station closures ===
| Date | City of license/Market | Station | Channel | Affiliation | Sign-on date | Notes |
|---|---|---|---|---|---|---|
| March 18 | Boston, Massachusetts | WHDH-TV | 5 | CBS | November 26, 1957 | |
| December 31 | Lubbock, Texas | KMXN-TV | 34 | Spanish independent | October 24, 1967 | |
| Unknown date | Baltimore, Maryland | WMET-TV | 24 | Independent | March 1, 1967 | |

== See also ==
- 1972 in television
- 1972 in film
- List of American films of 1972
