= History of HBO =

History of the American pay television network

HBO is an American premium television network that is the flagship property of Home Box Office, Inc., a subsidiary of Warner Bros. Discovery. The network primarily broadcasts theatrically released motion pictures and original television programs as well as made-for-cable movies, documentaries, occasional stand-up comedy and concert specials, and periodic interstitial programs (consisting of short films and making-of documentaries). HBO does not accept traditional advertising, although programming promotions are typically aired between shows; it also presents content without editing for profanity, violence, sexual depictions, nudity, drug use or other subjectively objectionable material, which—besides being able to depict mature subject matter usually not allowed to air on advertiser-supported television networks—has allowed the network to give program creators full creative autonomy over their projects.

The oldest and longest continuously operating subscription television service in the United States, Home Box Office pioneered modern pay television when it launched as a microwave-transmitted regional service (initially debuting in northeastern Pennsylvania, before gradually broadening its coverage area to encompass much of the northern Mid-Atlantic and southern New England regions) on November 8, 1972, and was a leader in the development and growth of the cable television industry as the first television service to be directly transmitted and distributed to individual cable systems; the first television channel in the world to begin transmitting its signal via communications satellite; the first pay television network to operate a standalone companion service (Take 2, now defunct; followed later by Cinemax and the now-defunct Festival); the first cable-originated network to win Emmy, Golden Globe and Peabody Awards; and one of the first two American pay television services (alongside Cinemax) to offer multiplexed channels complementary to the parent service.

HBO has since expanded to include seven multiplex channels in the United States; and, through its namesake parent subsidiary, twelve active and three defunct international services (either owned by Warner Bros. Discovery directly or through programming and brand licensing agreements with domestic media companies) across four continents, and various television, film and home entertainment ventures. This article details the history of HBO, tracing back to its founding by Sterling Communications (founded in 1950 as Sterling Movies U.S.A; then controlled by Time Inc.) in July 1971, and its operational history from the channel's November 1972 launch to its current ownership by Warner Bros. Discovery, Inc.

== Background, development and preparation to air (pre-1972) ==
HBO's origins trace to December 1, 1965, when Charles Dolan—a former marketer and distributor of sports and industrial films for television syndication, who had already done pioneering work in the commercial use of cables—was granted a franchise permit by the New York City Council to build a cable television system encompassing the Lower Manhattan section of New York City (traversing southward from 79th Street on the Upper East Side to 86th Street on the Upper West Side). Dolan was one of three applicants to be awarded cable franchise permits by the City of New York on that date, joined by TelePrompTer Corporation (which was assigned most of Upper Manhattan) and CATV Enterprises Inc. (which was assigned to a portion of the city's Upper West Side, extending north of the Harlem River, and The Bronx's Riverdale neighborhood). Dolan had been directly involved in telecasting since he launched his maiden television venture, Teleguide, in June 1962; transmitted via closed-circuit television, the Teleguide service distributed a schedule of tourist information, news, interview segments and feature interstitials to hotels, and by 1964, apartment buildings and office buildings in the New York metropolitan area.

Through Dolan's company, Sterling Information Services (operated by Teleguide parent Sterling Movies U.S.A., it renamed Sterling Communications in 1967), Manhattan Cable TV Services began limited cable service in September 1966. Manhattan Cable (renamed Sterling Manhattan Cable Television in January 1971) was the first urban underground cable television system to operate in the United States. Rather than string up cable on telephone poles or use microwave antennas to receive the signals, Sterling had laid new cable lines beneath the streets of and into buildings throughout Manhattan, and repurposed Teleguide's existing cable infrastructure for use by the new operation. Sterling's use of underground cables complied with a longstanding New York City Council ordinance—originally implemented to prevent broad-scale telephone and telegraph outages, after a severe blizzard affecting the Northeastern United States in March 1888 had caused widespread damage to above-ground utility lines in the area—requiring all electrical and telecommunication wiring to be laid underground to limit weather-related service disruptions, and was also necessitated because the multitude of tall buildings on Manhattan Island subjected television signals to reception impairments.

Dolan curried the financial backing of Time-Life, Inc. (then the book publishing unit of Time Inc.), resulting in Manhattan Cable becoming one of the company's first cable system properties. Despite the investments from Time-Life's share of Sterling (initially 20% at the beginning of operations), Sterling Manhattan consistently lost money throughout its first six years of operation; the company incurred much of its debt from underground wiring expenses (costing as much as $300,000 per mile), and its difficulties attracting new subscribers to generate income (Manhattan Cable managed to receive only around 400 customers by 1967). On August 27, 1969, in an ownership consolidation of the cable assets, Sterling Communications acquired the 49% share in Sterling Manhattan held by Time-Life, in exchange for stock and other assets worth $1.84 million. (Time-Life's interest in Sterling Communications concurrently increased from 25% to 44.5%.)

Desperate to keep the company afloat, Dolan began conceiving ideas to help make Sterling Manhattan profitable. In the summer of 1971, while on a family vacation en route to France aboard the Queen Elizabeth 2, he began developing a proposal for a cable-originated television channel. The concept, codenamed "The Green Channel", was for a subscription service that would offer unedited theatrical movies licensed from the major Hollywood film studios and live sporting events, all presented without interruptions by advertising and sold for a flat monthly fee to prospective subscribers. Dolan wanted to offset the service's start-up costs by having Sterling enter into carriage agreements with other cable television providers to transmit and sell the service to their customers, and draw revenue from fees charged to subscribers who added the channel onto their existing cable service (which then consisted exclusively of local and imported broadcast stations).

In the early 1970s, the cable television industry was not very profitable, and was under constant scrutiny from FCC regulators and the major broadcast television networks (CBS, NBC and ABC), who saw cable as a threat to their viability, even though it was originally conceived to provide improved reception of commercial and non-commercial television stations in communities and rural areas that tended to experience spotty to poor signal reception farther away from their city-grade contours. Attempts to launch pay television services had been done on an experimental basis in the United States dating to 1951 (among them, Phonevision in New York City, Chicago and Hartford; SubscriberVision in New York City; Telemeter in Palm Springs, California; and Telemovies in Bartlesville, Oklahoma) with little to no success, muzzled by campaigns backed by movie theater chains and commercial broadcasters to assuage television viewers to the supposed threat of pay television to the movie industry and free-to-air television access, limited user interest, and FCC restrictions on the types of programming that could be offered to subscription services. As Dolan presented his idea of to management at Time-Life, they were initially hesitant to consider the "Green Channel" proposal, but eventually agreed to assist him in backing the project.

After the Federal Communications Commission ruled that local governments could not restrict the operation of subscription television services in cable franchise terms, in July 1971, Sterling Communications—now consisting of Sterling Manhattan; its Long Island-based sister system, Sterling Nassau Cable Television; production firm Allegro Films; and direct-to-cable programming firm Television Presentations Inc.—informed the FCC that it planned to operate a cable-originated pay television service. Because Sterling's New York City Council franchise grant specifically required FCC approval for that purpose, Time/Sterling filed an FCC request to authorize pay television operations. Sterling indicated that a subscription television operation would also help Sterling Manhattan fund its fledgling local origination channel, which had incurred $1 million in start-up debt on top of annual company operating losses of $250,000. On September 10, 1971, the FCC gave preemptive authorization to Time-Life and Sterling Manhattan Cable to begin a pay television operation. On November 2, 1971, Time Inc.'s board of directors approved the "Green Channel" proposal, agreeing to give Dolan a $150,000 development grant for the project.

To gauge potential consumer interest, Time-Life sent out a direct mail research brochure to residents in six U.S. cities. An overwhelming majority of those surveyed (approximately 99%) opposed the idea of paying for a subscription television service, with only 1.2% favoring the concept and expressing interest in being a paying subscriber. In a second survey conducted by an independent consultant, 4% of respondents polled said they were "almost certain" to subscribe to such a service. A subsequent test conducted by Time-Life to respondents in Allentown, Pennsylvania had salesmen present the pay channel concept to residents by offering them free service for the first month and a refundable installation fee; half of all interviewed residents had expressed interest in purchasing the conceptual service with the offered incentives.

During the planning stages, film distributors initially expressed reluctance to license their movies to the Sterling project unless they were provided a count of its potential audience reach and subscription pricing estimates to establish a licensing payment structure similar to their compensation from films shown in theaters. Since the channel would air films without edits for objectionable content, cable operators also wanted to know what movies would be shown on the service to avoid potential advertiser objections and FCC fines for indecency. Sterling executives ultimately agreed to pay a flat licensing fee to the movie studios to acquire film rights. Sterling also allowed cable operators the ability to market the service directly to their customers.

Time-Life and Sterling Communications soon proposed for the "Sterling Cable Network" to be the name of the new service. Discussions to change the service's name took place during a later meeting of Dolan and the executive staff he hired for the project, who ultimately settled on calling it "Home Box Office", which was meant to convey to potential customers that the service would be their "ticket" to movies and events that they could see without having to leave their own home. The moniker was intended as a placeholder name in order to meet deadlines to publish a memorandum and research brochures about the new service; management intended to come up with a permanent name as development continued; however, the "Home Box Office" name stuck.

Multiple obstacles had to be overcome to get the service on the air. A New York City Council provision applying to the company's franchise agreement prohibited the telecast of theatrical feature films over pay television franchises. To circumvent this, rather than launch Home Box Office over Sterling Manhattan, Dolan chose to scout another city with two competing cable franchises to serve as its inaugural distribution system. Originally, he settled on the Teleservice Cable (now Service Electric) system in Allentown. However, management found out that Allentown and surrounding areas fell within the Philadelphia 76ers's 75-mile (121 km) television blackout radius, which the team enforced to protect revenues generated from ticket sales for their home games (then held at the Spectrum). Since HBO was planning to carry regular-season and playoff games from the National Basketball Association (NBA), any 76ers games that the service aired would have been prohibited from being shown within Allentown. Time-Life subsequently agreed to an offer by Teleservice president John Walson to launch HBO on the company's Wilkes-Barre system (located outside of the 76ers' blackout radius), fed from an AT&T microwave link at the Pan Am Building in New York. (HBO, which elected to forego pursuing telecast rights to 76ers basketball games, would sign on to Teleservice's Allentown system as its second cable affiliate in February 1973.)

In August 1972, the National Association of Theatre Owners (NATO) attempted unsuccessfully to block Sterling's application to build three community antenna relay (CARS) facilities it planned to use to transmit HBO, over concerns that pay cable service would compete unfairly with movie theaters by using revenue from cable systems to "siphon" content and, by association, audiences from theatres.

== Launch and expansion as a regional service (1972–1975) ==
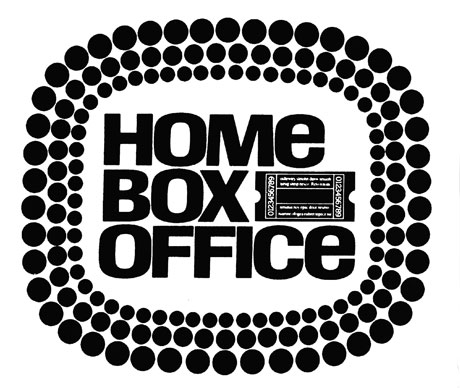
Original HBO logo, used from November 8, 1972 to April 30, 1975.

HBO's launch came with very little fanfare in the press; other than print advertisements promoting the launch in the Wilkes-Barre Times Leader, the service's debut lacked coverage from local or national media outlets. The city administrator of Wilkes-Barre declined an offer to attend the launch ceremony, while Time Inc. vice president J. Richard Munro became stranded in traffic on the George Washington Bridge en route from Manhattan, and was not able to arrive in Wilkes-Barre for the ceremony. Further complicating preparations for the inaugural telecast, in Midtown Manhattan, strong winds—produced by a storm system that brought areas of freezing rain over portions of the New York City area that evening—toppled the Pan Am Building reception dish being used to relay the Home Box Office signal to microwave towers linked to Teleservice's Wilkes-Barre headend. Time-Life representatives sent a technician to repair the antenna in time for the service's launch, completing maintenance about 25 minutes before the inaugural telecast.

Home Box Office launched at 7:30 p.m. Eastern Time on November 8, 1972. The service's inaugural program and event telecast, a National Hockey League (NHL) game between the New York Rangers and the Vancouver Canucks from Madison Square Garden, was transmitted that evening over channel 21—its original assigned channel on the Teleservice system—to its initial base of 365 subscribers in Wilkes-Barre. (A plaque commemorating the launch event is located at Public Square in downtown Wilkes-Barre, established in honor of Service Electric's April 1984 addition of HBO sister channel Cinemax to its lineup. Wilkes-Barre resident Marion Sabestinas, who was the first Teleservice customer to sign up to pay the $6 fee to receive Home Box Office's programming at launch, was honored with a lifetime subscription to Cinemax as part of the plaque ceremony.) The first movie presentation shown on the service aired immediately after the sports event: the 1971 film Sometimes a Great Notion, starring Paul Newman and Henry Fonda.

Initially airing nightly on an open-ended schedule dependent on the length of the evening's programs (usually from 7:00 p.m. to 12:00 a.m. ET), Home Box Office's programming initially consisted solely of theatrical films—including four or five recent titles per month—and event programming. Each evening's schedule was arranged to present either a double feature (which, under FCC anti-siphoning rules then maintained to protect programming supply for broadcast stations until they were struck down by the U.S. Court of Appeals for the District of Columbia Circuit in March 1977, tended to be of releases dating no more than two years from their initial theatrical exhibition), or a combination of either a sports or special event and a theatrical movie, often bridged by a short film or other interstitial content. Home Box Office licensed theatrical motion pictures from various film studios (such as Warner Bros. Pictures, 20th Century Fox, Universal Studios, Columbia Pictures and Paramount Pictures) on a per-title basis; each film received as many as five showings during their scheduled calendar month, depending on the quantity of titles available each month. HBO typically prohibited showings of X-rated, pornographic and foreign art films. (The network's prohibitions on X-rated films would eventually be carried over to films assigned an NC-17 rating, albeit with rare exceptions, after the MPAA created it as a replacement for the X rating in 1990.)

Home Box Office's extensive and exclusive sports coverage differentiated it from many other subscription television services that launched in the succeeding decades, laying the groundwork—to an extent—for the development of ESPN and other national and regional cable-originated sports networks (including MSG Network, Prime Sports Networks, SportsChannel, and the various descendants of the latter two regional network groups), and was replicated during the 1970s and early 1980s by several local broadcast- and microwave-transmitted subscription services. Through a contractual amendment signed on November 1, 1972, eight days before the service launched, HBO inherited broadcast rights to Madison Square Garden-originated events that had been contracted to Sterling Manhattan for one of its local origination channels (which served as the progenitor of the MSG Network) since May 1969. Throughout its first eight years, HBO's sports lineup included New York Yankees Major League Baseball games; NCAA Division I college basketball games originating from Madison Square Garden; World Football League (WFL) games; American Basketball Association (ABA) games; North American Soccer League games; select LPGA golf tournaments; Canadian Football League games; World Hockey Association regular season and playoff games; Eastern College Athletic Conference (ECAC) tournaments (including the Men's Ice Hockey Tournament and the ECAC Holiday Festival basketball tournament); World TeamTennis; the World Wide Wrestling Federation from Madison Square Garden, the National Horse Show; the Westminster Kennel Club Dog Show; and Professional Bowlers Association (PBA) tournament events. Out of its sports broadcasts, boxing would be the most enduring part of HBO's programming lineup, beginning with its January 22, 1973, telecast of "The Sunshine Showdown", a world heavyweight championship bout from Kingston, Jamaica—in which George Foreman defeated Joe Frazier in two rounds—that effectively began what became the network's flagship sports program, HBO World Championship Boxing.

As part of their subscription, subscribers received Home Box Office: Your Monthly Entertainment Guide (later retitled HBO On Air in September 1975, and then [The] HBO Guide in February 1977). The digest size program guide—which would also be distributed to guest rooms of HBO's hotel clients starting in 1978—provided programming highlights and complete daily listings for the month; until the May 1980 issue, it also featured "HBO Soundtrack" (originally "Up Front"), an occasional column outlining HBO's upcoming programming and answering common programming questions. The HBO Guide ceased print publication in December 2008; a PDF-formatted online program guide, borrowing from the print version's format, began publishing in January 2002, and was made available for download through the websites of HBO and Cinemax (for which the PDF guide was marketed jointly until it ceased publication after the February 2020 issue), and the Home Box Office Inc. lodging website (until full-time site maintenance ceased in August 2014 to focus on a new, separate microsite for HBO Bulk Markets, a broader-encompassing bulk distribution unit for hospitality properties).

By the end of 1972, the service was received by 1,395 subscribers, all from Teleservice customers in Wilkes-Barre; this number increased to around 4,000 subscribers by February 1973, across Teleservice's Wilkes-Barre, Allentown and Bethlehem, Pennsylvania, systems. A third Time-commissioned pay television study by Lieberman Research Inc. released that month, surveying 450 Telecable Wilkes-Barre subscribers (split evenly between 150 current, former or non-subscribers of HBO), found 79% of all respondents (including 76% of former subscribers and 59% of non-subscribers) preferred at-home viewing of movies; male respondents expressed strong interest in viewing sports events on pay television, while a mostly female share of respondents had a strong interest in seeing pay television broadcasts of live Broadway musicals and plays. Time Inc. president James R. Shepley, who was a driving force behind the development of HBO at the corporate level, said: "Time Inc. has long been intrigued with this method of communication. Initial marketing results indicate a bright role for subscription television. It seems clear that people are willing to pay fair prices to see television programs of their choice which are free of commercials."

On February 28, 1973, Sterling Communications announced it would spin-out HBO and associated assets into a new subsidiary, Home Box Office, Inc. Time Inc. received 9% of Sterling's HBO equity (expanding the former's controlling HBO shares to around 75% of its equity) and committed a $3-million direct investment in the subsidiary. Sterling also raised Time's equity in the company to 66.4% in exchange for the added HBO stake, through the purchase of additional stock and a converted $6.4-million note obligation. Charles Dolan—who reportedly had major disagreements with Time-Life management on policy issues, claims which the company denied—subsequently resigned as chief executive officer of Sterling Communications and HBO, accepting a $675,000 buyout of a portion of his stock while remaining on the board of directors at both companies in the interim; Dolan used portions of the sale's proceeds to repurchase Time's share of the Sterling Nassau systems and to start the Long Island Cable Community Development Co. (the forerunner to Cablevision Systems Corporation, which would be combined with the Sterling/Cablevision systems on Long Island) as the system's parent company. Gerald M. Levin—an entertainment industry attorney previously with New York City-based law firm Simpson Thacher & Bartlett, who had been with Home Box Office since it began operations as its director of finance, and later as its vice president and director of programming—replaced Dolan as the company's president and CEO. Expanding beyond movies and sports, 1973 saw HBO innovate the concept of original programming for cable television, developing entertainment programming produced by and, at least initially, intended for exclusive broadcast on the channel. On March 23, 1973, HBO broadcast its first non-sports entertainment special, the Pennsylvania Polka Festival, a three-hour-long music event broadcast from the Allentown Fairgrounds in Allentown.

On May 9, 1973, Time began to sell its controlling share of Sterling to Warner Communications (predecessor entity to Warner Bros. Discovery) for $20 million; high start-up and operating costs for HBO and other Sterling cable assets were reported to be the cause of the sale. Time intended to convert the 260,000 convertible notes it held in Warner's cable television unit, Warner Cable Communications, into common stock shares totaling up to 20% in interest. Sterling would then maintain oversight of Home Box Office under Warner's purview. The Time-Warner cable deal was terminated on June 27, after both companies failed to reach a definitive sale agreement for HBO and the other Sterling subsidiaries; financial arrangements made between Sterling and the New York City Council as part of their 20-year noncompete franchise agreement were alleged to have curtailed the sale.

On July 19, 1973, Time Inc. reached an agreement to purchase and assume financial liabilities of Sterling Communications for $6.2 million (including $3.1‐million in redeemed public debentures). Time completed its acquisition of Sterling on September 18, 1973, formally dissolving the Sterling holding company and transferring Home Box Office and Sterling Manhattan Cable to its Time-Life Broadcast division. (The "Sterling" name was subsequently removed from the Manhattan system, which was renamed "Manhattan Cable Television".) As the acquisition was being completed, HBO was struggling to grow: by October, the service had around 8,000 subscribers across 13 cable systems in Pennsylvania and southern New York State that cumulatively served 110,095 subscribers, and it was suffering from a significant churn rate as subscribers who found the channel's program scheduling repetitive, because of the limited allotment of movies outside of special events, decided to cancel their service.

In January 1974, HBO expanded its programming to an average of eight hours per day (from 5:30 p.m. to 1:30 a.m. ET/PT) on weekdays and twelve hours (from 1:30 p.m. to 1:30 a.m. ET) on weekends, depending on that day's programming lineup. Along with movies and sports, programming at this time had expanded to include concert specials and other music programs, daytime children's programs and various instructional series. With its programming expansion to late afternoons, the service began maintaining a longstanding watershed policy prohibiting R-rated feature films from airing before 8:00 p.m. ET/PT. The policy may be traced to HBO's availability at the time on analog cable tiers, and was maintained long after competing premium services began offering daytime showings of R-rated films as early as 1980 because of subscriber objections to the practice. The policy also would be applied to original series, movies and documentaries containing mature material consistent with the present-day TV-MA rating (later applying to original and acquired programs that were actually assigned that rating after the TV Parental Guidelines system was implemented across the television industry on January 1, 1997). (As of 2020, enforcement of the watershed policy on the main HBO feed has been greatly diminished: it currently permits afternoon airings of R-rated films and TV-MA-rated programs on a modest basis; however, it does not allow such programming to be scheduled earlier than 2:00 p.m. ET/PT, with the timeslots of initial airings of R-rated films varying each day. The watershed policy was never extended to most of HBO's multiplex channels, although HBO Family, since its December 1996 launch, has prohibited R-/TV-MA-rated programs from airing on its schedule.)

Over the two years following its launch, Home Box Office steadily expanded its regional reach: it became available in New York State for the first time in October 1973, when TelePrompTer's Mount Vernon and Ceracche TV Corp.'s Ithaca systems began offering the service. by January 1974, HBO was available on 14 cable systems in New York State and Pennsylvania; The service's addition to UA-Columbia's Wayne system expanded its regional coverage expanded into New Jersey in June 1974. In order to stem its financial losses, on November 13, 1973, Manhattan Cable—which had announced its intent to offer HBO as an extra-fee subscription offering in July of that year, as a move to stem net losses exceeding $10 million—filed a request to the City of New York to allow operation of a pay channel.

On June 21, 1974, the New York City Board of Estimate passed a resolution that opened access for programmers to lease channel space for subscription television services on Manhattan Cable and TelePrompTer Cable, and cleared Manhattan Cable to offer HBO on a two-year experimental leased basis, in exchange for a 5% fee paid to the city from the system's subscription revenue share. Although the resolution permitted it to offer HBO to its subscribers in Midtown and Lower Manhattan immediately, in order to market the service to potential subscribers, Manhattan Cable Television waited until October 18, 1974, to begin offering HBO on its lineup. (Manhattan Cable turned its first quarterly profits in the first half of 1976, generated in part from, among other factors, revenue from HBO subscriptions.) Terrestrial transmission of HBO via multipoint distribution service (MDS) began by the Fall of 1974, available to residents in Philadelphia and Wilmington, Delaware (via Micro-TV Inc.) and to select apartment buildings in Queens. (MDS transmission would supplement HBO's coverage into the late 1980s, to both distribute its programming in areas with limited to no cable penetration and as an alternative means to receive the network in areas with cable service.)

As Home Box Office's distribution expanded throughout the northern Mid-Atlantic and southern New England, Time/Sterling established a network of microwave receivers and connecting cables on utility landlines to feed HBO's programming from the New York relay antenna to the service's participating cable systems. Although its base had grown from what it had when HBO was being conceived, Sterling Manhattan Cable continued to lose money because the company had only a small subscriber base of 20,000 customers within Manhattan; HBO also faced financial issues, losing nearly $9,000 per month in part due to fees it paid to AT&T (averaging $11,000) to maintain its New York-based microwave link that was not made up for through the monthly fees it collected from subscribers. Initially, HBO received only a $3.50 cut from the $6.50 monthly fee paid by subscribers (equivalent to $50.03 in 2025 adjusted for inflation), the remainder of which went to cable systems that offered the service. In November 1974, as it was observing its second anniversary, HBO—then available to cable television and MDS systems in Pennsylvania, New York State, New Jersey and Delaware—had passed the 40,000-subscriber mark. By April 1975, the service had around 100,000 subscribers within its four-state service area.

HBO's sports coverage expanded in July 1975, as it inaugurated regional coverage of the Wimbledon tennis tournament. (That year saw Arthur Ashe defeat defending champion Jimmy Connors, 6–1, 6–1, 5–7, 6–4, in the Gentlemen's Singles final, becoming the first Black male to win a Wimbledon singles title.) Initially, the HBO telecasts of the tournament mainly consisted of replays culled from other video sources (including the BBC); HBO Sports began to employ an in-house team of commentators starting with the 1978 tournament. Throughout its tenure on the channel, Wimbledon coverage on HBO—which was the first television network to offer weekday tennis coverage on network television—consisted of singles and doubles events from the early rounds of the tournament. (NBC—which had the over-the-air broadcast rights to Wimbledon since 1969—maintained rights to the quarterfinal, semifinal and final rounds as well as weekend early-round matches.)

== National expansion, innovation and rise to prominence (1975–1989) ==
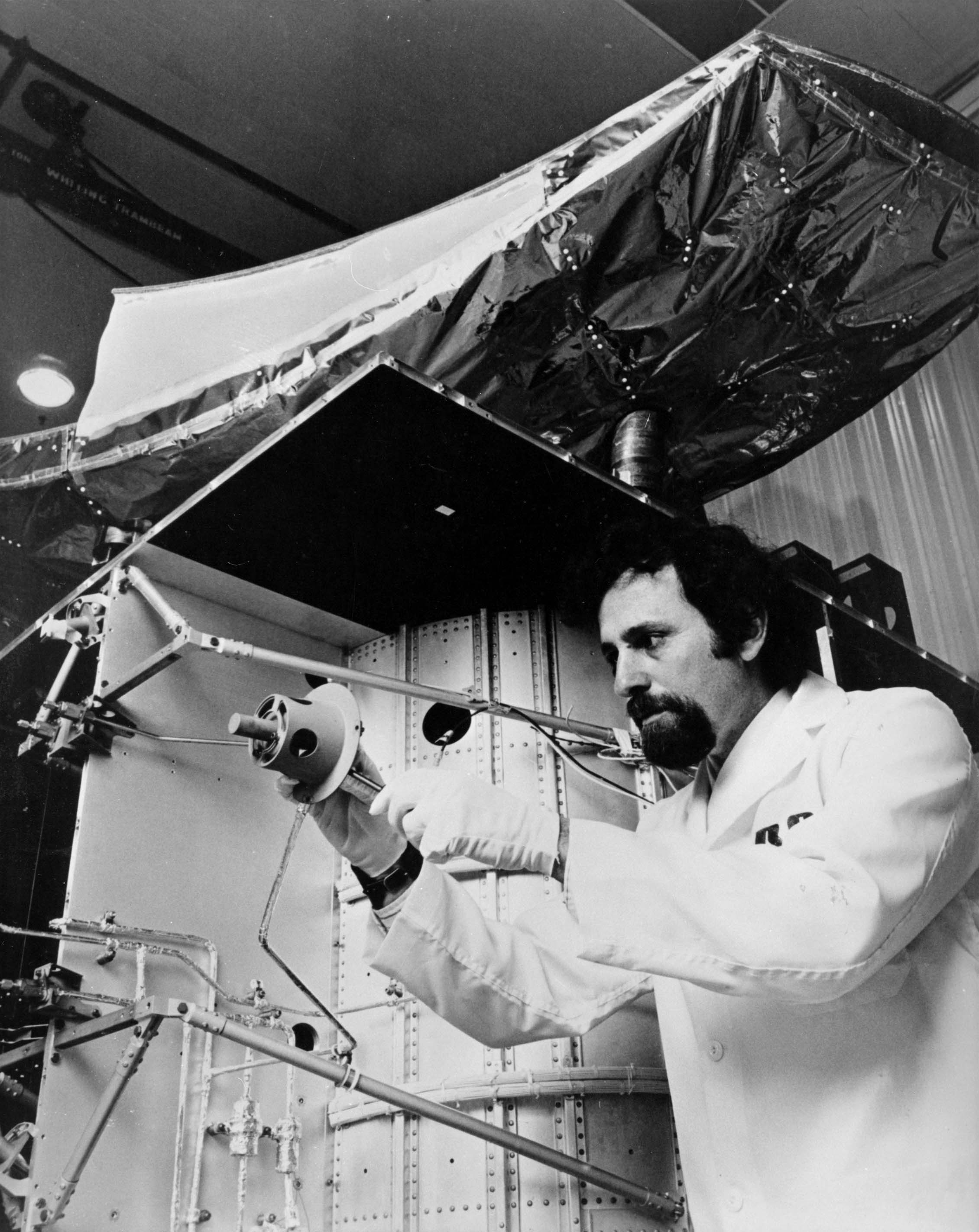
The RCA Satcom domestic communication satellite launched on December 13, 1975, spurred the cable television industry to unprecedented heights – with the assistance of HBO.

In the Fall of 1974, executives from Time Inc. and the Home Box Office unit began conceptualizing ideas to expand HBO into a national pay television service. Developing a vast infrastructure of microwave and coaxial telephone relay towers in all 50 states and U.S. territories would have been cost-prohibitive for Time/HBO due to the time and expense involved. HBO's existing microwave network was also expensive and difficult to maintain—especially in winter, when snow and ice storms periodically disrupted service—along with being geographically limiting, as the signal could only be fed to an affiliated cable system if it was along the microwave signal's path.

Seeing it as the only efficient and cost-effective option to expand distribution of Home Box Office to the entire nation, Time settled on using a geostationary communications satellite to transmit HBO directly to cable providers throughout the United States within and outside of its existing microwave relay network. Other television broadcasters at the time were hesitant about uplinking their feeds to satellite because they feared that the satellites may inadvertently shut down or jettison out of their orbit, as well as holding reservations about the cost of purchasing downlink receiver dishes, which in 1974, were sold for as much as $75,000 (equivalent to $489,625.51 in 2025 adjusted for inflation). Sid Topol, president of cable television equipment manufacturer Scientific Atlanta, met with RCA Americom Communications (which was granted FCC permission to operate and launch a telecommunications satellite), Home Box Office and a group of multiple system cable operators (MSOs) to propose having the RCA satellite transmit the HBO signal; Scientific Atlanta (through a client arrangement with Transcommunications Corp.) would agree to build earth-based satellite relay stations to be set up outside of HBO's Manhattan headquarters and to the service's client cable systems. RCA and HBO agreed to Topol's proposal, and the Time-Life board subsequently approved the satellite transmission plan.

On April 11, 1975, Levin and Time-Life unveiled plans to distribute the HBO signal via satellite to cable systems elsewhere throughout the United States, announcing a $7.5-million agreement (including $6.5 million allocated by Levin) with RCA Americom to lease a transponder on the then-under construction Satcom I—which was expected to be launched at the end of 1975—for a five-year term. HBO also signed an agreement to distribute the satellite feed on eight UA-Columbia Cablevision systems in California, Texas, Florida, Arizona, Arkansas and Washington State, and have earth station receivers built at their headends to intercept and relay the signal. Now that a more superior transmission method than Home Box Office's existing land-based distribution network was being developed, Time/HBO lined up agreements with various cable system operators—including MSOs like American Television and Communications Corporation, Comcast, Cox Cable, Jones Intercable, Heritage Communications and TelePrompTer Cable—to redistribute the satellite feed for system-determined fees of between $6 and $9 per month. HBO also entered into preliminary discussions with Kansas City-based regional cable service Target Network Television, from which a deal did not materialize, to share a transponder, either by dividing their respective airtime to allow HBO broad coverage in the Midwestern United States or dividing transmission by geographic region. Through the Scientific Atlanta contract, UA-Columbia and other cable providers also commissioned earth station dishes through Scientific Atlanta to receive the HBO satellite feed at their headend sites.

On September 30, 1975 at 9:00 p.m. Eastern Time, Home Box Office became the first television network to continuously deliver its signal via satellite when it transmitted the "Thrilla in Manila", televised from the Araneta Coliseum in Cubao, Philippines. Subscribers of UA-Columbia's Fort Pierce and Vero Beach, Florida systems and American Television and Communications's Jackson, Mississippi system joined HBO's existing cable and MDS affiliates in the Mid-Atlantic U.S.—some of which were beginning to transition from microwave to satellite delivery of the network—in receiving the heavyweight championship boxing match that saw Muhammad Ali defeat Joe Frazier by technical knockout. HBO temporarily fed its domestic Eastern and Pacific feeds to Westar 1 for the first four months of satellite transmissions; the network's transmissions shifted to Satcom 1 when full-time commercial service began on February 28, 1976. The network's programming expanded with the switch to satellite transmission, operating daily from 1:30 p.m. to 1:30 a.m. ET/PT in an extension of its weekend schedule to weekdays. (A lack of G- and PG-rated films in its inventory and low afternoon viewership were cited for a 20-hour rollback of HBO's weekly schedule on October 11, 1976—reverting to the 5:30 p.m. ET/PT weekday start time it had prior to the start of its satellite feeds and, with adjustments for sports events, reducing its weekend schedule to begin at 3:00 p.m. ET/PT.)

First version of HBO's current logo, used from May 1, 1975 to January 31, 1981; after the revised logo (as shown in the article's introduction) was introduced on April 1, 1980, HBO continued to include some promotions and on-air identifications using the original 1975 incarnation for ten months as it transitioned to the newer design.

Through the use of satellite, the network began transmitting separate programming feeds for the Eastern and Pacific Time Zones, allowing the same programs that are first broadcast in the eastern half of the United States to air at accordant times in the western part of the country. One month after the satellite launch, preliminary estimates—taken toward the end of an extended free preview of HBO on all three systems—showed that around 8,250 of approximately 25,630 subscribers between the three charter systems had signed up for the service, and within three months of the satellite uplink, 58,000 customers (or approximately 32% of their combined penetration) among six of the eleven cable systems that added HBO—in Jackson, Mississippi; Fort Pierce and Vero Beach, Florida; Tulsa, Oklahoma; Fort Smith, Arkansas; and Laredo, Texas—had signed up for the service, joining 230,000 subscribers in the Northeastern U.S. HBO estimated that eleven cable systems received its signal via satellite by the end of 1975. HBO achieved coast-to-coast distribution in December 1975, when TelePrompTer added the network to its Seattle–Tacoma, Washington, systems, extending its reach to the West Coast.

The growth of HBO would spur the development of the pay television industry during the late 1970s and into the 1980s. Although Warner Communications was the first to launch an HBO competitor with the April 1, 1973, launch of videotape-transmitted pay movie service Star Channel (renamed The Movie Channel in November 1979), the expansion of HBO via satellite prompted other companies to launch rival pay television services; cable-originated pay services that sprouted over the next decade included Showtime, a similar general entertainment service initially focusing on movies and non-sports event programming that was launched by Viacom on July 1, 1976; Home Theater Network, a family-oriented movie service launched by Group W Satellite Communications on September 1, 1978; Bravo, a film and arts service (now a commercial entertainment service primarily focusing on reality series) launched by Rainbow Media and Warner-Amex Satellite Entertainment on December 8, 1980, as a two-night-per-week timeshare service shared with now-defunct R-rated film service Escapade; and Spotlight, a movie channel co-founded in consortium by Times Mirror Satellite Programming Company, Storer Communications, Cox Cable and Tele-Communications Inc. (TCI) that launched on May 28, 1981. Broadcast- and microwave-transmitted pay (or “subscription television”) services modeled upon HBO's flat-fee, general entertainment concept—including PRISM (a Philadelphia-based microwave service launched on September 1, 1976, and operating via various transmission methods until October 1997), ONTV (launched in Los Angeles on April 1, 1977, and later operating as a national over-the-air pay franchise until June 1985), SelecTV (launched in Los Angeles on July 23, 1978; later operating as a national over-the-air pay franchise until 1985, then solely available via C-band satellite until January 1991) and Wometco Home Theater (a New York City-based broadcast service operating from March 1, 1977 to March 1, 1986)—were launched in several major and mid-sized U.S. cities to mainly act as cable alternatives in unwired areas.

The network's move to transmit its signal via satellite uplink also culminated in the conception of modern basic cable service, as distributors began developing entertainment channels marketed to cable system operators to be packaged with local and adjacent-market imported broadcast stations. By 1977, two fledgling cable networks had joined HBO in pioneering satellite delivery for the cable television industry, becoming the first of many to adopt satellite transmission over the coming years: Atlanta-based independent station WTCG-TV (soon to become WTBS; now sister network TBS and operating wholly cable-originated), which, through then-owner Ted Turner, became the first independent station to become a national superstation on December 17, 1976; following suit was the upstart CBN Satellite Service (later to become the present-day Freeform), started by Pat Robertson as the first satellite-delivered religious network on April 1, 1977.

On December 31, 1975, HBO premiered its first comedy special, An Evening with Robert Klein, the first of nine HBO stand-up specials that the comic headlined over 35 years. Positive viewer response to the special led to the creation of On Location, a monthly anthology series that presented a stand-up comedian's nightclub performance in its entirety and uncut; it premiered on March 20, 1976, with a performance by David Steinberg. The network would gradually cultivate a reputation in the comedy world for its stand-up specials, which have helped raise the profile of established comedians (including George Carlin, Alan King, Rodney Dangerfield, Billy Crystal and Robin Williams) and served as the launchpad for emerging comic stars (such as Dennis Miller, Whoopi Goldberg, Chris Rock, Roseanne Barr, Patton Oswalt, Margaret Cho and Dave Chappelle), many of whom have gone on to television and film careers.

By April 1976, Home Box Office reached 386,000 subscribers (306,000 through its terrestrial microwave-landline network, 75,000 through satellite distribution, and 5,000 through MDS-served apartment complexes.) It passed 500,000 subscribers by August 1976, including 180,000 brought into HBO's base through the July 27 closure of its purchase of pay-television programming services company Telemation Program Services, which Time/HBO acquired to provide content mediation with program distributors and, with initial intent, to use Telemation to develop "customized" programing schedules for HBO's cable affiliates. (Through a contest searching for its 500,000th subscriber, HBO rewarded married elementary school teachers Lester and Carole Diehl, who subscribed through United Cable Television's San Leandro, California system, with an expense-paid vacation to Hawaii and a $200 cash prize presented at a San Francisco press conference featuring comedian John Byner that was shown during the October premiere of his first On Location special.)

Concert-based music specials became a part of the network's content with the June 19, 1976, premiere of The Fabulous Bette Midler Show, (Note: While The Bette Midler Show is the program's official title, the June 1976 edition of the HBO Guide also refers to the special as The Fabulous Bette Midler Show, using both titles interchangeably.) a stage special featuring Midler performing music and comedy routines. It served as the linchpin for the creation of Standing Room Only, a monthly series featuring concerts and various stage "spectaculars" (including among others, burlesque shows, Vaudeville routines, ventriloquism and magic performances) taped live in front of an audience, which premiered on April 17, 1977 with Ann Corio's 'This Was Burlesque' as inaugural broadcast. By the end of 1977, the network had around one million subscribers across 435 cable and MDS systems serving 45 states. Time's third-quarter fiscal report that year disclosed that HBO had turned its first profit in nearly five years of operation.

The network achieved full nationwide distribution in December 1978, having garnered 750 cable affiliates in all 50 U.S. states with around two million subscribers. Programming gradually expanded over time; by January 1979, HBO's programming day lasted between nine and eleven hours per day (usually from 5:00 p.m. to 2:00 a.m. ET/PT) on weekdays and around 12½ hours (usually from 2:30 p.m. to 3:00 a.m. ET/PT) on weekends. By April 1980, when the current version of its 1975 logo was first introduced, the full "Home Box Office" name had been de-emphasized in most on-air and other promotional parlance, in favor of identifying under the "HBO" initialism. (The full name is still used as the legal corporate name of its parent subsidiary under Warner Bros. Discovery, and is used on-air in copyright legalese during the end credits of its original programs and network IDs shown twice per day—in the morning and late afternoon—at the close of promotional breaks; presenting credits shown at the start of its original specials; and a proprietary vanity card—based on the "static noise" card that has preceded HBO's original series, specials and documentaries since 1993—shown at the close of the network's original programs.) Subscribership mostly doubled each year into the early 1980s, increasing from around four million subscribers (across 1,755 systems) in December 1979 to around 10.4 million subscribers (across 3,600+ systems) by November 1982.

On June 5, 1981, HBO announced it would transition to a 24-hour, seven-day-a-week programming schedule at the start of 1982. Then-HBO President James Heyworth said the decision was effectively forced by rival Showtime's announcement of its pending switch to a 24-hour daily schedule effective July 4 (both announcements were made at that year's National Cable Television Association [NCTA] Convention), as well as the prior switches of The Movie Channel (on December 1, 1979) and Cinemax (on January 1, 1981) to 24-hour programming. (Along with the four larger pay services, Spotlight offered 24-hour programming from September 1, 1981 until it ended operations on February 28, 1984. Home Theater Network, in contrast, maintained a 12-hour-a-day schedule from January 1, 1982—when its programming day expanded by approximately three hours—until it ended operations on January 31, 1987.) The first phase of the switchover commenced on September 4, 1981, when HBO adopted a "24-hour" weekend schedule (typically running about 58 consecutive hours, from 5:00 p.m. ET/PT Friday until 3:00 a.m. ET/PT Sunday/early Monday). To facilitate the extra weekend programming, HBO and Modern Talking Pictures, then-owner of the Modern Satellite Network (MSN; now defunct), agreed to trade their respective leased timeslots on Satcom I transponder 22 (then assigned to HBO's Pacific Time feed). MSN—which had earlier subleased the bulk of its afternoon hours to Hearst/ABC Video Services for its planned women's channel Daytime—subleased its weekend transponder hours (from 8:00 a.m. to 1:00 p.m. ET/PT) to HBO, in exchange for the latter's unused weekday 10:00 a.m. to noon ET/PT transponder time. Three months later on December 28, 1981, it began offering a full 168-hour weekly schedule (except for occasional interruptions for scheduled early-morning technical maintenance), adding programming full-time from 3:00 a.m. to 5:00 p.m. ET/PT Monday through Friday.

After having only produced a limited amount of unscripted programming since the debut of its first weekly series, Inside the NFL, in September 1977, 1983 saw HBO venture into original scripted programming. On January 3, 1983, the network premiered Not Necessarily the News, a news satire lampooning the week in politics that originally aired as a comedy special in September 1982. The series was cited as having laid the groundwork for satirical news programs that came in later years (such as The Daily Show, The Colbert Report and a later HBO series, Last Week Tonight with John Oliver), and featured Conan O’Brien and Greg Daniels, among other notable comics and comedy writers, among its writing staff over its eight-season run. On January 10, 1983, HBO premiered its first regularly scheduled children's program, Fraggle Rock. Created by Jim Henson (who produced the 1978 ACE Award-winning special Emmet Otter's Jug-Band Christmas for HBO) and co-produced with Television South, the Canadian Broadcasting Corporation and Henson Associates, the series (which ran for five seasons, ending in March 1987) centered on a group of various interconnected Muppet species.

Later that year, on May 22, 1983, HBO premiered The Terry Fox Story, the first television movie ever produced for the network and the first to be produced for a pay television channel. The biographical film profiled the Canadian amputee runner (Eric Fryer) who embarked on a cross-country run across Canada to raise money and awareness for cancer research before Fox's deteriorating health from advanced cancer (from which he succumbed) ended the trek after 143 days. Besides its venture into original programming that year, in early 1983, HBO jumped ahead of its competitors to become the first pay television service to broadcast Star Wars. As was common with film rights at the time in the pay-TV industry, 20th Century Fox sold off the premium television rights to the science fiction classic on a non-exclusive basis: HBO, Showtime, The Movie Channel, Home Theater Network and Spotlight were contractually bound to premiere it no earlier than 6:00 a.m. Eastern Time on February 1. However, HBO had managed to air the movie at midnight ET that same day, from a planned debut at 7:30 p.m. ET on February 1, after paying Fox for permission to broadcast the film six hours ahead of the competition without promoting their coup to attract an audience other than night owls.

In August 1984, Home Box Office Inc. announced plans to scramble the HBO and Cinemax satellite feeds using the Videocipher II encryption system, becoming the first satellite-delivered television networks to encrypt their signals from unauthorized reception by approximately 1.5 million C-band dish owners as well as by various businesses (including hotels, motels and bars) that used rooftop satellite antennas to freely receive HBO, rather than paying for the network through its affiliated cable systems. Periodic testing of Videocipher II signal scrambling began to be carried out during promotional breaks between programs on HBO's Pacific Time Zone feed on April 15, 1985, and on its Eastern Time Zone feed on April 29. (Testing initially commenced on the Pacific feed of Cinemax on March 15, and extended to that service's Eastern feed on April 22.) By August 1985, encryption extended to the entirety of the daytime schedule (from 6:00 a.m. to 6:00 p.m. ET/PT) on HBO and Cinemax's respective Eastern and Pacific feeds.

HBO and Cinemax began scrambling their signals full-time on January 15, 1986, requiring customers to pay an extra fee to get one or both networks as their subscribers through cable systems had long done. Widespread complaints were fielded to Home Box Office Inc. and satellite dish retailers from television receive-only (TVRO) dish users who previously could view HBO and Cinemax's programming for at no extra cost on their corresponding transponder signals, particularly because of the cost of Videocipher II set-top descramblers needed to unencrypt the signal (retailing up to $395, plus $12.95 each for a monthly subscription [or $19.95 for a bundling of both HBO and Cinemax], equal to or slightly higher than the networks' cable subscription rates, and rental fees for the Videocipher receivers). The Satellite Television Industry Association (SPACE) and independent satellite dealers worried about the negative impact on the satellite business from the loss of unencrypted access to HBO and Cinemax and the expansion of full-time signal scrambling to other basic and premium cable networks, as dish sales sharply plummeted and several satellite retailers across the U.S. closed as a result; this spurred SPACE, in March 1986, to lobby for Congressional legislation to protect access to satellite transmissions.

The fallout from the full-time scrambling came to a head four months later on April 27, when John R. MacDougall, an Ocala, Florida satellite dish retailer calling himself "Captain Midnight", staged his own protest of the changes by redirecting a receiver dish towards HBO's Galaxy 1 transponder and intercepting the network's signal during a late-night presentation of the 1985 spy drama film The Falcon and the Snowman. In this act of broadcast signal intrusion, the film's telecast was overridden with a text-based message written by MacDougall, placed over SMPTE color bars and composed using a Quanta Microgen MG-100 character generator, in protest of the channel's decision to scramble its signal for home satellite subscribers and warning other premium services of possible backlash if they followed suit ("$12.95/MONTH ? NO WAY ! [SHOWTIME/MOVIE CHANNEL BEWARE!]"). The Federal Communications Commission subsequently charged MacDougall for "illegally operating a satellite uplink transmitter" in violation of the Communications Act of 1934, for which he pleaded guilty after deciding to cooperate with the FCC's investigation into the incident; under a plea bargain deal, MacDougall was fined $5,000, was put on unsupervised probation for one year, and had his amateur radio license suspended for one year.

By May 1987, HBO's programming was received by approximately 15 million subscribers across about 6,700 cable systems nationwide. As the 1980s wound down, HBO saw its subscriber base expand greatly as a byproduct of the 1988 Writers Guild of America strike; throughout the strike (which lasted from March 7 to August 7 of that year), HBO had an inventory of first-run programming whereas the broadcast networks were only able to air reruns of their shows because of the abrupt halt to their production schedules and the delayed start of the fall television season. Leaning into its growing prominence in pay television, in 1989, HBO unveiled the promotional campaign "Simply the Best"—which used the Tina Turner single "The Best" as its imaging theme in some on-air advertisements—basing its programming in comparison to rival Showtime.

On January 2, 1989, Selecciones en Español de HBO y Cinemax ("Spanish Selections from HBO and Cinemax"), a Spanish-language audio feed transmitted through, depending on the cable system affiliate, either an auxiliary second audio program channel (accessible through built-in and external multichannel audio decoders) or audio simulcasts via FM radio, launched. The service—which initially launched on 20 cable systems in markets with significant Hispanic and Latino populations, and aimed specifically at Spanish-dominant and first-language Spanish speakers— originally provided Spanish-dubbed versions of recent feature film releases from HBO and Cinemax's movie suppliers. By that Spring, Selecciones's offerings expanded to include Spanish audio simulcasts of HBO's live boxing matches (except for certain events broadcast exclusively in Spanish on networks such as Galavisión). Selecciones en Español de HBO y Cinemax—replaced by two dedicated channel feeds, HBO en Español and Cinemax en Español, on September 27, 1993, effectively acting as part-time simulcast feeds with added first-run Spanish-language movies (mostly from Mexico, Argentina and Spain), and Spanish dubs of HBO's non-sports-event original programming—quickly gained interest from providers, expanding to an additional 35 cable systems in various U.S. markets in the weeks following its debut.

== Time Warner ownership; rising prominence of original programming (1989–2016) ==
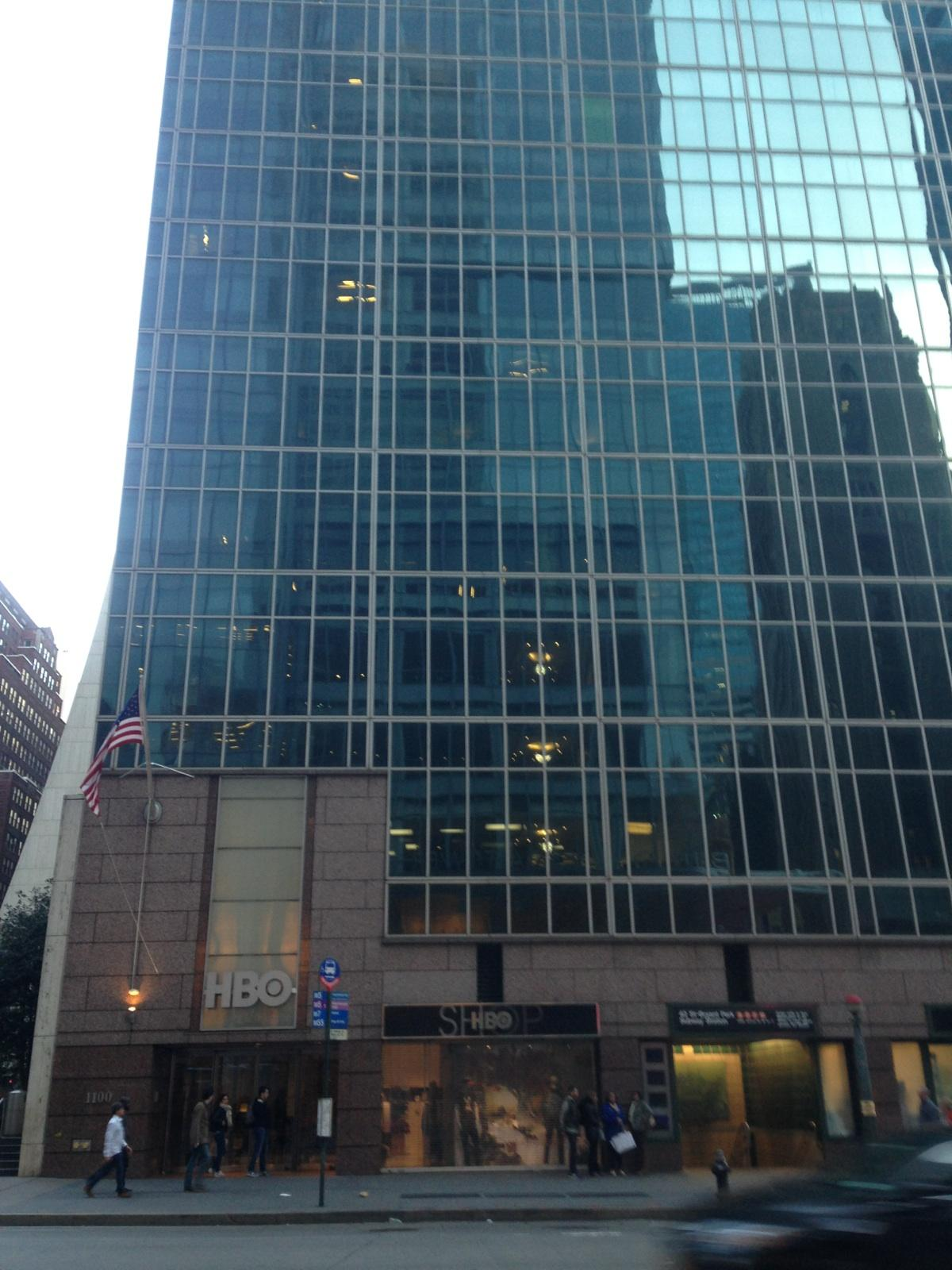
Former HBO headquarters in New York City, United States, April 2017. The network moved its operations to WarnerMedia's corporate headquarters at 30 Hudson Yards in the city's West Side district in 2018.

On March 4, 1989, Warner Communications—which, through joint venture group Warner-Amex Satellite Entertainment, sold its interest in The Movie Channel parent Showtime/The Movie Channel, Inc. (now Showtime Networks) to Showtime founder and majority partner Viacom in 1986—announced its intent to merge with HBO parent Time Inc. for $14.9 billion in cash and stock. Following two failed attempts by Paramount Communications to legally block the merger, as Paramount was seeking to acquire Time in a hostile takeover bid, the merger was completed on January 10, 1990, resulting in the consolidated entity creating Time Warner, which was the parent company of the network until the merger of the company (as WarnerMedia) with Discovery, Inc. to form Warner Bros. Discovery in 2022. (Manhattan Cable Television would be integrated into Time Warner Cable—formed through a consolidation of the cable system assets of American Television and Communications [ATC], which Time acquired for $140 million in January 1978 and subsequently integrated with Manhattan Cable, and Warner Cable Communications—and would adopt its parent unit's identity in January 1993. Time Warner Cable would be spun-off from its namesake parent as an independent company in 2009, and later merged into Spectrum in May 2016.) By the start of 1990, HBO served 17.3 million subscribers out of a cumulative 23.7 million subscribers covered between it and sister network Cinemax.

On August 1, 1991, HBO and Cinemax became the first subscription television services to launch "multiplexed" companion channels—a term coined by then-CEO Michael Fuchs to equate the channel tier to a multi-screen movie theater—offering, at no extra charge to HBO subscribers, distinct schedules with programs culled from HBO's programming libraries separate from offerings shown concurrently on their respective parent primary channels. TeleCable customers in Overland Park, Kansas, Racine, Wisconsin and suburban Dallas (Richardson and Plano, Texas) that subscribed to either service began receiving two additional HBO channels, HBO2 and HBO3, as part of a test launch. (A secondary Cinemax channel, Cinemax 2 [now MoreMax], was also test launched on the three systems.) The HBO multiplex would eventually expand to include four additional channels: HBO Family (on December 1, 1996), HBO Comedy (on May 6, 1999), HBO Zone (on May 6, 1999), and HBO Latino (on November 1, 2000).

On January 1, 1993, HBO and Cinemax—accompanied by Showtime and The Movie Channel—became the first television services in the world to transmit their signals using digital compression technology. The compressed satellite feeds, fed through Galaxy 1, were fixed at compression ratios intended to maintain "state-of-the-art" signal quality at provider headends. (The DigiCipher system, developed in 1992 by General Instrument to replace the Videocipher II system that was standard among satellite-delivered cable channels, was designed with an advanced encryption algorithm co-developed by AT&T that was structured to prevent the signal piracy issues that were apparent with the Videocipher II.) The adoption of the DigiCipher allowed Home Box Office, Inc. to transmit three HBO feeds and the primary Cinemax channel through the compression standard to participating systems that adopted the technology, and served as the benchmark for the launch of additional multiplex channels of both HBO and Cinemax utilizing compression—commencing with the December 1996 launch of HBO Family and concluding with the 2001 launches of four Cinemax channels: WMax (now MovieMax), @Max (now Cinemáx), OuterMax and 5StarMax.

On March 1, 1994, HBO, Cinemax and rivals Showtime and The Movie Channel implemented a cooperative content advisory system to provide to parents specific information about pay-cable programming content that may be unsuitable for their children; the development of the system—inspired by the advisory ratings featured in the HBO Guide and other program guides distributed by the major premium cable services, and labeled at each co-owned service's discretion—was in response to concerns from parents and advocacy groups about violent content on television, allowing HBO and other services to assign individual ratings corresponding to the objectionable content depicted in specific programs (and categorized based on violence, profanity, sexuality or miscellaneous mature material). A revised system—centered around ten content codes of two to three letters in length—was implemented across HBO and the other participating pay services on June 10, 1994.

During the 1990s, HBO began developing a reputation for high-quality and irreverent original programming; it was throughout this decade that the network experienced increasing success among audiences and acclaim from television critics for original series such as Tales from the Crypt (a horror anthology series based on the 1950s EC Comics series of the same name), Dream On (from eventual Friends creators Marta Kauffman and David Crane, and which utilized clips from black-and-white television series to illustrate the thoughts of divorced New York City book editor Martin Tupper [Brian Benben]), Tracey Takes On... (a topical sketch comedy show, in which comedienne Tracey Ullman, tackles a specific subject through sketches and monologues), Mr. Show with Bob and David (a sketch comedy series hosted by Bob Odenkirk and David Cross, featuring on-stage sketches and pre-taped pieces) and Arliss (a Robert Wuhl-led comedy about the exploits of a sports agent). HBO's original programming of this period up until the 2020s was consciously about and aimed at men, rather than women; as HBO executive Michael Fuchs said in a 2010 interview: "I've figured out through research, and in my own mind, that the man of the house decided whether to have HBO or not. (...) If commercial television had a female slant, HBO had a male slant."

One of the scripted comedy programs that premiered early in the decade, Garry Shandling vehicle The Larry Sanders Show, arguably became HBO's flagship series of the 1990s; although it was not commercially as successful as programs airing on the Big Three networks (ABC, NBC and CBS) and Fox, the show—which followed the production of a fictional late night talk show—enjoyed a cult status and critical acclaim, and received multiple nominations and wins for many major television awards (including four CableACE Awards, three Primetime Emmy Awards, three Golden Globe Awards and two Peabody Awards). Along with influencing HBO's later scripted programming efforts, Larry Sanders—which ran for six seasons from August 1992 to May 1998—served as an influence for other show business-based satire series (such as 30 Rock, My Life on the D-List and Studio 60 on the Sunset Strip), the use of celebrity guest stars portraying themselves, the absence of laugh tracks now synonymous with single-camera sitcoms and its use of embarrassment-structured comedy (as later popularized by The Office, Arrested Development and the HBO original comedy Curb Your Enthusiasm). The series ranked #38 on TV Guide's list of the "50 Greatest TV Shows of All Time" in 2002 (becoming the only HBO comedy series to make the list) and was also included in Time's list of the "100 Best TV Shows of All Time" in 2007. The Larry Sanders Show was also ranked by various critics and fans as one of the best TV comedies of the 1990s.

The original programs that HBO has developed since the early 1990s have earned the channel numerous Emmy and Golden Globe Award nominations and wins. HBO has been nominated in at least one category at the Emmys and Golden Globes since 1988 (when the network earned its first Emmy nomination for Danny Glover's performance as Nelson Mandela in the 1987 original movie Mandela), and set a record for the most Primetime Emmy nominations for a television network in a single year (137) in 2019. Two reasons for what is perceived as the higher quality of these shows are the quality of the writing on the programs and the fact that as a subscription-only service, HBO does not carry "normal" commercials; instead the network runs promotions for upcoming HBO programs and behind-the-scenes featurettes between programs. This relieves HBO from some pressures to tone down controversial aspects of its programs, and allows for more explicit content to be incorporated into its shows that would not be allowed to air on broadcast television or basic cable, such as profanity, strong/graphic violence, nudity and graphic sex scenes.

In July 1997, HBO premiered its first one-hour dramatic narrative series Oz, centering on the inmates of the Oswald State Correctional Facility, a fictional level 4 maximum-security state prison. The program helped start the trend of narrative dramas incorporating gritty realism and storytelling that became standard among premium cable services to the present day. While Oz was critically acclaimed throughout its six-season run, it was not until The Sopranos premiered in January 1999, that the network achieved widespread critical success with an hour-long drama series. The Sopranos—centering on mob patriarch Tony Soprano (James Gandolfini) and his family—received 111 Emmy nominations and 21 wins over the course of its six-season run, including two honors for Outstanding Drama Series. The mob drama's first wins for Outstanding Drama and Outstanding Supporting Actress in a Drama Series (for Drea de Matteo) in 2004, two of the four Emmys it won that year, marked the first time that a cable program won in either category over a program on one of the major broadcast networks.

1998 saw the debut of From the Earth to the Moon, a 12-part miniseries that was produced by Tom Hanks, Ron Howard and Brian Grazer and based on the Andrew Chaikin book A Man on the Moon. Costing $68 million to produce, it traced the U.S. space program from the space race between the United States and the Soviet Union through the final Moon landing, Apollo 17. From the Earth to the Moon—which won three Emmy Awards, including for Outstanding Miniseries, and a Golden Globe for Best Miniseries or Television Film—helped lay the groundwork for other high-profile historical films and miniseries produced by the network in subsequent years including 61* (a Billy Crystal-directed 2001 biopic chronicling New York Yankees legends Roger Maris and Mickey Mantle's New York Yankees race to break Babe Ruth's 1927 single-season record of 60 home runs), Band of Brothers (a ten-part 2001 miniseries produced by Hanks and Steven Spielberg, about the E Company soldiers of the 506th Parachute Infantry Regiment during the European Theater combat of World War II), John Adams and The Pacific (a ten-part 2010 companion miniseries to Band of Brothers from Spielberg and Hanks, based on the 1992 Stephen E. Ambrose book focusing on the United States Marine Corps's Pacific Theater battles during World War II).

In June 1998, Sex and the City, based on the book series of the same name by Candace Bushnell, made its debut on the network. Over the course of its six-season run, the comedy series—centering on the friendship and romances of four New York City women—received 54 Emmy nominations and won seven, including one win for Outstanding Comedy Series, and in 2004, the first wins for Outstanding Lead Actress in a Comedy Series (for Sarah Jessica Parker) and Outstanding Supporting Actress in a Comedy Series (for Cynthia Nixon) for HBO since the network first gained Emmy eligibility. On June 25, 1999, HBO Sports announced it would discontinue coverage of Wimbledon after a 25-year run following that year's tournament, citing a need to "refresh" HBO's programming slate; this left HBO's boxing franchises (which expanded in February 1996 to include a secondary program for rising boxing talent, HBO Boxing After Dark, and soon expanded to include a short-lived, hip-hop-infused boxing program, KO Nation, in May 2000) as the lone remaining competitive sports offering in its programming portfolio. As part of a joint contract between HBO sister company Turner Broadcasting System, NBC and the All England Lawn Tennis and Croquet Club, the tournament rights shifted over the succeeding three years between Turner-owned TNT (in 2000), CNN/SI (in 2001) and CNNfn (in 2002), before the cable rights moved over to ESPN (which assumed full American television exclusivity over the championship in 2012) beginning with the 2003 tournament.

On March 6, 1999, HBO began transmitting a high definition simulcast feed of its primary channel, becoming the first American cable-originated television network to begin simulcasting their programming in the format. Until January 2001, HBO HD only transmitted some theatrical films from the network's programming suppliers and HBO's in-house original movies in the format, as existing widescreen prints of those films were already scalable in the 16:9 widescreen aspect ratio and could readily be upconverted to HD resolution. Original programming began to be made available in HD on January 14, 2001, as part of a 13-week Sunday "encore" presentation of the second season of The Sopranos that was remastered in 1080i HD. (HBO had been requiring the producers of its original series to film their episodes in widescreen—subsequently downconverted for the standard definition feed—to fit 4:3 television screens since 1996, in order to future-proof them for remastering in HD.) Sports telecasts were upgraded to HD on September 25, 2004, with an HBO World Championship Boxing fight card headlined by Roy Jones Jr. and Glen Johnson.

The 2000s opened with two series that, although they did not surpass The Sopranos in viewership success, maintained similar or matched its critical acclaim, further cementing HBO's reputation as a leading producer of quality television programming. Six Feet Under, premiering in August 2001, was an ensemble drama centering on the lives of a family managing a Los Angeles funeral home. Winning, among others, nine Emmys, three Screen Actors Guild Awards, three Golden Globe Awards and a Peabody Award, it has since been regarded as one of television's best all-time series including under rankings by Time, The Guardian, and Empire. The Wire, premiering in June 2002 and created by author and former police reporter David Simon, was an anthology-style crime drama focusing on different Baltimore institutions and their relationship to law enforcement in each season, tying subsequent storylines through existing characters and prior storylines. While it never won any major television awards, it earned wide critical acclaim for its writing and depictions of criminal and law enforcement issues, also becoming regarded as one of the best series of all time by media organizations such as TV Guide, Entertainment Weekly, Rolling Stone, and the BBC.

The 2003 miniseries Angels in America (based on the Pulitzer-winning play by Tony Kushner, centering around the intersecting lives of six people in 1985 New York), became the first (and to date, only) program to sweep all seven major categories at the Primetime Emmys in the ceremony's history as well as the second program (after Caesar's Hour in 1957) to win all four main acting categories during the 2004 ceremony. In 2005, HBO entered into an agreement with Cingular Wireless (since integrated into the AT&T Mobility unit of HBO's present-day governing parent company AT&T) to establish HBO Mobile, a pre-smartphone era mobile subscription web service that provided information on HBO's original programming (including episode guides), mobile wallpapers and ringtones voiced by cast members of the channel's series. (HBO Mobile also operated a similar service, HBO Family Mobile, which offered full-length episodes of the channel's children's programming.) HBO experienced additional viewer success with the 2008 debut of True Blood, a vampire-themed fantasy horror drama based on The Southern Vampire Mysteries gothic novel series by Charlaine Harris. While earning few major television awards throughout its run, True Blood's average viewership often rivaled that of The Sopranos, peaking at an average of 12.4 million per week (counting repeat and on-demand viewership) during its second season.

The network saw three more hit series premiere in the 2010s: Game of Thrones—based on George R. R. Martin's fantasy novel series A Song of Ice and Fire—which earned both critical and viewer praise, and set a single-year record for Emmy wins by an individual program in 2015 with 12 awards; Girls, a comedy series created by series star Lena Dunham; and True Detective, an anthology-style series—structured to feature a different cast and setting within each season's storyline—which initially saw established film actors Woody Harrelson and Matthew McConaughey in its lead roles.

On August 13, 2015, HBO announced its re-entry into children's programming, when it reached a five-year programming and development deal with Sesame Workshop. Through the agreement, HBO obtained first-run television rights to Sesame Street, beginning with the January 2016 debut of its 46th season (with episodes being distributed to the program's longtime broadcaster, PBS, following a nine-month exclusivity window at no charge to its member stations); Sesame Workshop will also produce original children's programming content for the channel, which also gained exclusive streaming rights to the company's programming library for HBO Go and HBO Now (assuming those rights from Amazon Video, Netflix and Sesame Workshop's in-house subscription streaming service, Sesame Go, the latter of which will cease to operate as a standalone offering). Although struck with the intent to having the show remain on PBS in some fashion, the nonprofit production company reached the deal due to cutbacks resulting from declines in public and private donations, distribution fees paid by PBS member stations and licensing for merchandise sales. With the debut of HBO Max in May 2020, all Sesame Workshop content previously carried on the linear HBO service shifted to the OTT platform upon Max's launch.

After 2016, under the leadership of programming head Casey Bloys, HBO began to increasingly produce shows about and aimed at women, such as Girls, Veep, Westworld, Euphoria, and House of the Dragon. This broke with the network's tradition of catering primarily to the tastes of a core audience of young men, which it had sought to attract with shows about "male antiheroes and outlaws", as well as copious female nudity.

== AT&T ownership (2016–2021) ==
On October 22, 2016, AT&T announced an offer to acquire Time Warner for $108.7 billion, including debt it would assume from the latter; the merger would bring Time Warner's various media properties, including HBO and Cinemax, under the same corporate umbrella as AT&T's telecommunications holdings, including satellite provider DirecTV and IPTV/broadband provider AT&T U-verse. Time Warner shareholders approved the merger on February 15, 2017. On November 20, 2017, the U.S. Department of Justice filed a lawsuit against AT&T and Time Warner in an attempt to block the merger, citing antitrust concerns surrounding the transaction. U.S. clearance of the proposed merger—which had already received approval from European, Mexican, Chilean and Brazilian regulatory authorities—was affirmed by court ruling on June 12, 2018, after District of Columbia U.S. District Court Judge Richard J. Leon ruled in favor of AT&T, and dismissed antitrust claims asserted in the DOJ's lawsuit. The merger closed two days later on June 14, 2018, with Time Warner becoming a wholly owned subsidiary of AT&T, which renamed the unit WarnerMedia; the Home Box Office, Inc. unit and its assets were assigned to the newly formed WarnerMedia Entertainment division, although it continues to operate as an autonomous subsidiary. The U.S. Court of Appeals in Washington unanimously upheld the lower court's ruling in favor of AT&T on February 26, 2019.

In July 2018, The New York Times obtained audio from a corporate town hall meeting featuring AT&T executive John Stankey—CEO of WarnerMedia from the merger's completion until May 2020, when Stankey shifted to chief operating officer during his transition to replacing Randall Stephenson as AT&T's CEO—who argued that HBO's current content model was not profitable enough, and that the network had to produce more content (similar to that offered by streaming services such as Netflix) in order to achieve more engagement with subscribers (including short-form content oriented towards mobile devices), and that HBO needed to "move beyond 35 to 40 percent penetration to have this become a much more common product." Stankey's statement contradicted the fact that HBO had been consistently profitable over the last three years, totaling nearly $6 billion, while allocating more than $2 billion per year for programming. Building on this idea, on October 10, 2018, Stankey stated that the company was developing a new over-the-top (OTT) streaming service that would feature content from various WarnerMedia properties including HBO, Turner and Warner Bros. WarnerMedia would later announce on July 9, 2019, that the service would be co-branded with HBO, under the name HBO Max. The service—which was developed under a separate infrastructure from HBO's existing streaming platforms, HBO Go and HBO Now, and will not immediately replace those services—launched on May 27, 2020.

On September 27, 2018, HBO announced it would cease airing its boxing telecasts after 45 years—marking the end of competitive sports event broadcasts on the network—following the October 27 edition of HBO World Championship Boxing. (Two additional World Championship Boxing/Boxing After Dark cards would follow that originally scheduled final broadcast, on November 24 and December 8, respectively.) The decision cited factors including the influx of sports-based streaming services (such as DAZN and ESPN+) and issues with promoters that hampered its ability to acquire high-profile fight cards, and resulting declining ratings and loss of interest in the sport among HBO's subscribers, as well as WarnerMedia's efforts to have scripted programming become the primary focus of the network's original content. (Since the discontinuance of live sports telecasts, the HBO Sports production unit now exclusively serves to produce sports magazine shows and documentaries for the network.)

On November 1, 2018, HBO and Cinemax were pulled from Dish Network and Sling TV in a carriage dispute with Dish Network Corporation over distribution fees, marking only the second known instance that the network had ever been removed from a pay television provider (following a four-month displacement from 17 Times Mirror Cable systems to free up channel space for Spotlight, a rival pay service then owned through a consortium led by Times Mirror, from May to September 1981) and the first to result from a carriage dispute in its then 46-year history. The dispute did not affect Dish/Sling's carriage of WarnerMedia's other cable networks, which were distributed to the satellite and virtual MVPD providers under a separate carriage agreement. The stalemate lasted for 33 months, ending on July 29, 2021, when Dish and Home Box Office, Inc. reached an agreement to resume distribution of HBO and Cinemax's linear channels and on-demand content on the satellite provider, as well as offer access to HBO Max to Dish subscribers who receive the linear HBO channel tier.

On February 28, 2019, Richard Plepler stepped down from his position as CEO of Home Box Office, Inc., after a collective 27-year tenure at HBO and twelve years as head of the network and its parent unit. Plepler reportedly "found he had less autonomy after the merger," as Stankey felt Plepler was "attached to a fading distribution model" in which HBO programming was sold with other linear channels and to channel platforms operated by streaming distributors that AT&T would be competing with in content development; Stankey, meanwhile, wanted to leverage HBO and the broader WarnerMedia content library to develop a viable streaming competitor to Netflix. Plepler, meanwhile, had sought a plan he estimated would drive $7.5 billion in annual revenue for HBO/WarnerMedia by giving HBO and Cinemax substantial increases in content investment (including incorporating "family-friendly original, library, and licensed children's programming" onto Cinemax's schedule), negotiating a deal with Comcast to sell its TV Everywhere service HBO Go directly to the cable provider's broadband-only customers, and offering the HBO/Cinemax linear channel bundle to pay television customers at a slightly higher price point than the standalone HBO package's average monthly fee of $14.99, all ideas which Stankey felt would not drive enough additional revenue for the company in comparison to expanding its streaming offerings.

On March 4, 2019, AT&T announced a major reorganization of WarnerMedia's assets, dividing WarnerMedia's television properties among three corporate divisions. Home Box Office, Inc. (encompassing HBO, Cinemax, and their respective wholly owned international channels and streaming services) was reassigned to WarnerMedia Entertainment, placing it under the same umbrella as sister basic cable networks TBS, TNT and TruTV (which were formerly part of the dissolved Turner Broadcasting System subsidiary), and under the leadership of former NBC and Showtime executive Bob Greenblatt. (Other former Turner assets were split between two other new subsidiaries: WarnerMedia News & Sports, which oversees CNN and its sister networks, Turner Sports and management operations for NBA TV, and WarnerMedia Global Kids, Young Adults and Classics, a unit of Warner Bros. that oversees such networks as Cartoon Network and Turner Classic Movies.)

On August 10, 2020, WarnerMedia restructured several of its units in a major corporate revamp that resulted in Home Box Office, Inc. and all other WarnerMedia Entertainment assets being consolidated with Warner Bros. Entertainment to form WarnerMedia Studios & Networks Group. HBO/Cinemax President of Programming Casey Bloys—who has been with Home Box Office, Inc. since 2004 (as director of development at HBO Independent Productions), and was eventually elevated to programming president in May 2016—added oversight of HBO Max and WarnerMedia's basic cable networks to his purview. (The restructuring also resulted in the three former Turner networks reassigned to WarnerMedia Entertainment being brought back under the same umbrella as sister networks Cartoon Network/Adult Swim, Boomerang and Turner Classic Movies.) Among the around 800 employees whose positions were eliminated as part of the changes, the restructuring resulted in the layoffs of around 150 Home Box Office, Inc. employees.

== Warner Bros. Discovery ownership (2021–2026) ==
On May 17, 2021, AT&T and Discovery, Inc. reached a definitive Reverse Morris Trust agreement, in which AT&T would spin out WarnerMedia into an independent company (unwinding the prior 2017 acquisition of the former Time Warner) that would concurrently acquire Discovery's assets, for $43 billion in cash, securities and stock plus WarnerMedia's retention of certain debt. Under the transaction, which is expected to be finalized by the second quarter of 2022, Home Box Office Inc. and all other assets of WarnerMedia would be combined with the assets of Discovery, Inc. AT&T shareholders will own 71% of the company's stock and Discovery shareholders will own the remaining 29% share, with each shareholder group appointing representative board members; David Zaslav, President and CEO of Discovery, will head the new company, replacing WarnerMedia CEO Jason Kilar.

HBO subsequently faced a reorganization on August 15 to dismantle most of HBO Max's autonomous units, with HBO Max's head of comedy Suzanna Makkos now reporting to HBO's head of comedy Amy Gravitt, and layoffs within HBO Max's non-scripted, live-action family entertainment, international originals, and casting units, as well as HBO's acquisitions unit.

On July 18, 2024, it was reported by the Financial Times that Zaslav and WBD executives had been discussing the possibility of breaking up the company, so that WBD's unprofitable linear television networks could be separated from the more profitable Warner Bros. studio business and Max. On December 12, 2024, WBD announced plans to reorganize its studios, networks and direct-to-consumer/streaming divisions in mid-2025. These businesses will be reorganized into two units: "Streaming & Studios"—which will include Warner Bros., HBO, and Max, and "Global Linear Networks". Zaslav stated that the new structure would enable greater flexibility and "potential future strategic opportunities". It will also insulate WBD's declining cable networks from its more profitable studio and direct-to-consumer businesses. On December 28, 2024, Charles Dolan, the founder of HBO, died at the age of 98.

On May 8, 2025, CNBC's David Faber reported that WBD was "moving towards" the possibility of divesting its Global Linear Networks division as an independent company, following the lead of NBCUniversal's planned Versant spin-off. WBD confirmed the plans on June 9, 2025, announcing an intent to split into separate, publicly traded "Streaming & Studios" and "Global Networks" companies by mid-2026, which will be led by Zaslav and Gunnar Wiedenfels respectively; the "Global Networks" company would largely consist of WBD's legacy linear television and broadcast operations, including cable networks such as CNN and Discovery, the U.S. TNT Sports operations, its free-to-air networks in Europe, and Discovery+. Zaslav stated that "by operating as two distinct and optimized companies in the future, we are empowering these iconic brands with the sharper focus and strategic flexibility they need to compete most effectively in today’s evolving media landscape."

On December 5, 2025, Netflix announced that it would acquire the streaming and studio assets of Warner Bros. Discovery for $72 billion. The deal would contain HBO and HBO Max, alongside the Warner Bros. film, video game and television studios, and DC Entertainment/DC Comics. The company's linear networks and Discovery+, will be excluded from the deal, and would be spun off into a separate publicly traded company. Paramount Skydance would later launch a (now rejected) hostile takeover bid for the entirety of WBD three days later for an enterprise value of $108.4 billion.

On February 26, 2026, Paramount Skydance emerged as the winner of Warner Bros Discovery, following Netflix's exit of the deal, which was announced by David Zaslav. Unlike the Netflix deal, the Paramount Skydance deal would include the rest of the company's linear networks.
