= Travel Channel =

American pay television channel

- Country: United States
- Broadcast area: Nationwide
- Headquarters: New York City, U.S.

Programming
- Language: English
- Picture format: 1080i HDTV

Ownership
- Parent: Skydance Corporation
- Sister channels: see list of assets owned by Skydance Corporation

History
- Launched: February 8, 1987; 39 years ago
- Replaced: Home Theater Network
- Former names: The Travel Channel (1987–1997)

Links
- Website: www.travelchannel.com

Travel Channel (stylized as Trvl Channel since 2018, except Portugal) is an American pay television channel owned by Skydance Corporation. It was previously owned by Discovery from 1997 to 2007 and again from 2018 to 2022, and by Warner Bros. Discovery from 2022 until 2026 when they merged with Paramount Skydance. The channel is headquartered in Manhattan, with some related staff in Silver Spring, Maryland, and Knoxville, Tennessee.

Since 2018, Travel Channel features programming about ghosts, the paranormal in notable buildings, mysteries, and unexplained phenomena, among others. Prior to this, the network originally aired documentaries, reality, and how-to shows related to travel and leisure around the United States and throughout the world, including shows on African animal safaris, tours of grand hotels and resorts, visits to significant cities and towns around the world, as well as programming about various foods around the world.

As of November 2023, Travel Channel is available to approximately 67,000,000 pay television households in the United States-down from its 2011 peak of 96,000,000 households.

== History ==
Travel Channel logo used from February 26, 2011, to October 1, 2018, the previous logo used in international markets until August 31, 2021

=== Original format ===
The Travel Channel was launched on February 1, 1987; it was founded by TWA Marketing Services (a subsidiary of Trans World Airlines). The channel's name was derived from the travel-related filler programming that aired between programs on the Home Theater Network. TWA purchased the name rights from Group W Satellite Communications in 1986, and took over HTN's transponder spot following the shutdown of the premium cable channel in January 1987. In 1992, the network was sold to Landmark Communications, then-owner of The Weather Channel; five years later, Landmark sold it to Paxson Communications.

Discovery Communications acquired a 70% ownership stake in the channel in 1997, and subsequently acquired the remaining 30% interest from Paxson in 1999. In May 2007, Discovery Communications sold Travel Channel to Cox Enterprises subsidiary Cox Communications as part of a larger multibillion-dollar transaction.

On November 5, 2009, Scripps Networks Interactive acquired a 65% ownership interest in the network for $1.1 billion; the deal closed in January 2010. Following the purchase, Travel Channel began to add programming from sister networks such as Food Network. In 2015, Scripps relocated the channel's headquarters from Chevy Chase, Maryland to Knoxville, Tennessee.

On February 25, 2016, SNI acquired the remaining 35% stake in Travel Channel from Cox Communications, giving it full control over the network. Discovery regained ownership of the network on March 6, 2018, after acquiring SNI.

Viewership peaked in Spring 2008 at 27.78 million views per 7 days, and has been in decline ever since. As of Spring 2017, the channel got 17.25 million views.

=== Rebrand ===
On October 1, 2018, Travel Channel revealed a new logo stylized as Trvl Channel, and shifted its programming to focus on "the paranormal, the unsolved, the creepy and terrifying". From 2015 to 2017, Destination America had undergone a similar shift to paranormal programming themselves. Certain Travel Channel shows (such as Bizarre Foods, its spinoff series Bizarre Foods Delicious Destinations, Man v. Food, Food Paradise, Hotel Impossible, and Xtreme Waterparks) would move to either Destination America or Cooking Channel.

On January 12, 2021, it was reported that there were plans for selected Travel Channel programs to premiere exclusively on Discovery+ as timed exclusives.

== Outside the United States ==
On March 22, 2012, Scripps Networks Interactive announced that it had agreed to pay £65 million (equivalent to US$102.7 million) to acquire Travel Channel International Limited, the UK-based broadcaster which operates across the Europe, Middle East, Africa and Asia Pacific markets, but had no direct relation to the American television channel until then. The deal was completed on May 1, 2012, following regulatory approval.

In Canada, Travel Channel's programming has aired on T+E, and later, DTour.
