= WGVU =

Michigan TV and radio stations

WGVU Public Media is a group of radio and television stations licensed to and operated by Grand Valley State University, serving the Greater Grand Rapids, Michigan / Western Michigan area of the United States.

The stations in the group are:

- WGVU-FM, broadcasting on 88.5 MHz on the FM band. Simulcast on WGVS-FM/95.3 MHz in Muskegon.
- WGVU-TV and WGVK, broadcasting on channel 11 (Grand Rapids, mapped to channel 35)/5 (Kalamazoo, mapped to channel 52).
