= Spotlight (TV channel) =

American premium movie channel

- Country: United States
- Broadcast area: Nationwide (primarily on Dimension Cable Television, Cox Cable, Storer Cable and TCI systems)

Programming
- Language: English
- Picture format: 480i (SDTV)

Ownership
- Owner: Times Mirror Satellite Programming Company (Times Mirror Company); Storer Communications; Cox Cable; Tele-Communications Inc.

History
- Launched: May 28, 1981; 45 years ago
- Closed: February 1, 1984; 42 years ago
- Replaced by: Showtime; The Movie Channel (assumed Spotlight's subscriber base on systems that carried the channel)

Spotlight was an American premium cable television network that was founded by the Times Mirror Satellite Programming Company unit of the Times Mirror Company, and owned as a joint venture with Storer Communications, Cox Cable and Tele-Communications Inc. (TCI). The channel's programming focused mainly on theatrically released motion pictures, with the only scheduling deviation being of monthly specials previewing films set to air on the channel.

== History ==
=== Development and early history ===
Times Mirror announced the formation of Spotlight on March 12, 1981. Although it was intended to act as a direct competitor to existing movie-focused premium channels The Movie Channel and Home Theater Network, Spotlight was primarily developed to compete with dominant pay cable services HBO and Cinemax, which – like Spotlight – was owned by a media company with cable system interests, as parent company Time Inc. had owned the American Television & Communications Corp. (eventually integrated into Time Warner Cable and later Charter), the second-largest American cable television provider at the time (format-wise, HBO's programming contrasted from Spotlight, with a general interest format that mixed movies with specials and some limited original series within its lineup). Times-Mirror operated the channel as part of its cable programming unit, the Times Mirror Satellite Programming Company.

Originally scheduled to launch on May 1, Spotlight officially launched just over four weeks later on May 28, 1981. It was initially available primarily on cable systems operated by Times-Mirror's Dimension Cable Television unit; Dimension originally planned to replace HBO with Spotlight on most of the provider's 51 systems nationwide, although it would instead replace competing general interest service Showtime throughout most of its service areas.

In December 1981, Times-Mirror sold minority interests in the channel to Tele-Communications, Inc. (TCI), Cox Cable and Storer Communications; the three companies, then also among the nation's largest cable providers, mainly served as investors in Spotlight and added the channel to their respective systems; Times-Mirror remained managing partner, handling business and programming operations.

For its first year of operation, Spotlight transmitted its programming for twelve hours each day, from 12:00 p.m. to 12:00 a.m. Eastern Time. The channel began to maintain a 24-hour-a-day schedule in 1982 (in contrast, Cinemax had maintained a 24-hour schedule from its August 1980 launch, while The Movie Channel switched to 24-hour schedules in January 1980; Showtime and HBO followed suit in July and September 1981 respectively, the latter airing a 24-hour lineup on weekends only, before expanding its weekday programming to a round-the-clock schedule in December of that year). At its peak, Spotlight had 784,000 subscribers throughout the United States, comparatively less than HBO, Cinemax (which both had around 13 million subscribers), Showtime and The Movie Channel (which both had around seven million subscribers).

=== Shutdown and acquisition by Showtime-The Movie Channel ===
On December 12, 1983, Times-Mirror announced that Spotlight would cease operations after 2½ years, and would sell the channel's subscriber base and rights to its transponder to Showtime-The Movie Channel, Inc. for an undisclosed price. Each of the providers would offer their subscribers the option of purchasing either Showtime or The Movie Channel as a replacement for Spotlight, with those dissatisfied with Showtime's program offerings following a two-month sampling period during February and March permitted to exchange it for another premium channel at no charge.

In announcing its reasoning for closing the channel, Spotlight President John F. Cook cited that it was unlikely that the channel could sustain "acceptable profitability" long-term and the four partner companies had internal disagreements over the channel's operation. In addition, Spotlight had suffered from relatively limited national carriage throughout its existence as it was available exclusively to cable systems owned by Dimension, Storer, TCI and Cox, limiting the number of potential subscribers to the service. Cook noted that reaching distribution and marketing agreements with other providers would have been too cost-prohibitive to execute; and that the venture would not have been able to make justifiable expenditures to make licensing fee bids to major film studios that were competitive with those submitted by established pay services for the rights to certain films, commit to pre-production financing and finance the production of original made-for-cable films for the channel without a bigger financial commitment by the partners.

Spotlight shut down at 12:00 a.m. Eastern Time on February 1, 1984, at which time, all subscribers of the participating systems that carried Spotlight who received the channel began to automatically receive either Showtime or The Movie Channel, the service which replaced Spotlight depended on the provider's existing carriage of one or neither of the two pay services offered as replacements. Although they were both largely unavailable on Dimension's systems beforehand, Showtime-The Movie Channel President Michael Weinblatt estimated that approximately 100,000 subscribers of the four partner systems already received either Showtime or TMC, and that the absorption of Spotlight would increase the total number of paid subscribers to both channels by at least 650,000 to about eight million subscribers nationwide.

== Programming ==
As with most premium cable services at the time, Spotlight did not maintain exclusive first-run film licensing agreements major film studios, instead licensing films on an individual basis with studios such as Warner Bros. Entertainment, 20th Century Fox, Universal Studios, Columbia Pictures and Paramount Pictures; because of this lack of exclusivity over its content, the channel experienced a sizeable amount of duplication with its film inventory with Cinemax, Showtime, The Movie Channel and HBO, airing many of the same movies as any one of its competitors during the same calendar month.

The channel's prime time movie schedule initially maintained a "flip-flop" format, in which one film would be broadcast at 7:00 p.m. and another around 9:00 p.m. on one evening and with the two films being shown in reverse order the next night, with the late movie from the previous night being shown first. Singer Robert Goulet served as Spotlight's initial on-air spokesperson, appearing in some of its early promotional imaging campaigns, and also hosted the channel's launch. Spotlight's network identifications and feature presentation bumpers throughout its existence utilized a big band-type theme, with a sequence featuring an animation that zoomed into the "O" of the Spotlight logo, accompanied by a whooshing sound.

== See also ==
- Home Theater Network – A competing family-oriented premium channel owned by Group W Cable, which operated from 1979 to 1985.
- PRISM – A regional premium channel that served the Philadelphia, Pennsylvania metropolitan area, which operated from 1976 to 1997.
- ONTV – An over-the-air subscription television service, which operated from 1978 to 1985.
- SelecTV – An over-the-air subscription television service, which operated from 1979 to 1985.
