= Home Theater Network =

Former American cable TV network

- Country: United States
- Broadcast area: Nationwide
- Headquarters: Portland, Maine, U.S.

Programming
- Language(s): English

Ownership
- Owner: Group W Satellite Communications

History
- Launched: September 1, 1978 (46 years ago)
- Closed: January 31, 1987 (38 years ago) (8 years, 4 months and 30 days)
- Replaced by: Travel Channel

Home Theater Network (HTN) was an American premium cable television network that was owned by Group W Satellite Communications. Targeted at a family audience, the channel focused primarily on theatrically released motion pictures, along with travel interstitials that aired between select films.

== History ==
Home Theater Network launched on September 1, 1978. Originally owned by Diversified Communications, the service was later sold off a majority share to Westinghouse Broadcasting in 1980. The service operated initially for four hours a day, and later expanded its schedule to 12 hours a day; HTN was notable for airing non-exclusive G and PG-rated films (prior to 1984, when the PG-13 rating was first introduced by the Motion Picture Association of America). The channel boasted a policy of not running R-rated feature films (predating the launch of family-oriented multiplex services by HBO and Showtime that also omitted R-rated films from their schedules), and marketed itself as a lower-priced alternative to HBO, Cinemax, Showtime (which Group W later owned in part, making HTN a de facto sister network to Showtime from 1982, when it acquired TelePrompTer Corporation, to 1983) and The Movie Channel.

Prior to The Disney Channel's April 1983 launch, Walt Disney Pictures licensed select live-action films to many premium cable networks (including HBO, Showtime and Spotlight); as a result, HTN featured Disney fare such as Freaky Friday, Snowball Express, Pete's Dragon, Bedknobs and Broomsticks and The North Avenue Irregulars. Other films that HTN featured included Xanadu and The Private Eyes. In addition, the channel showcased travel-related programming as filler between films, billing these segments as "The Travel Channel".

In 1981, the service was expanded with the launch of HTN Plus, which was due to air four feature films daily in order to make up for the 12-hour expansion of the service.

From 1984 to 1985, Home Theater Network aired a live 90-minute call-in trivia program called Movie Talk America, in a Thursday primetime timeslot that was typically used to broadcast feature films. Hosted by Earle Ziff, the popular program would feature live calls from viewers as they competed for various prizes, as well as celebrity interviews and promotions for upcoming programs to be seen on HTN.

In October 1986, Group W Satellite Communications announced that it would shut down the network, citing a lack of subscriber growth despite a positive cash flow. Home Theater Network shut down on January 31, 1987, and Group W sold the transponder slot on Satcom 3-R and the "Travel Channel" name to Trans World Airlines to launch the present-day basic cable channel, now known as the Travel Channel.

== See also ==
- HBO
- Cinemax
- Showtime
- The Movie Channel
- Spotlight
