= List of International Emmy Awards ceremonies =

This is a list of International Emmy Awards ceremonies, the years which they were honoring, their hosts, and their ceremony dates.

== Ceremonies ==
#	Date	Host(s)	Network	Site
1st	November 21, 1973	Richard Attenborough	—N/a	Plaza Hotel
2nd	November 25, 1974	Julie Andrews		Plaza Hotel
3rd	November 24, 1975	Brock Peters	—N/a	Plaza Hotel
4th	November 22, 1976	Scatman Crothers	—N/a	Plaza Hotel
5th	November 21, 1977	Carl Reiner	—N/a	Plaza Hotel
7th	November 19, 1979	Dick Van Dyke	—N/a	Sheraton New York Times Square Hotel
8th	November 24, 1980	Peter Ustinov	—N/a	Sheraton New York Times Square Hotel
9th	November 23, 1981	Betty White	—N/a	Sheraton New York Times Square Hotel
10th	November 22, 1982	Edward Asner	—N/a	—N/a
11th	November 21, 1983	Mary Tyler Moore	—N/a	Sheraton New York Times Square Hotel
12th	November 19, 1984	Regis Philbin	—N/a	Sheraton New York Times Square Hotel
13th	November 25, 1985	Chris Sarandon	—N/a	—N/a
14th	November 24, 1986	Jennifer Jason Leigh	—N/a	—N/a
15th	November 23, 1987	Peter Ustinov	—N/a	—N/a
16th	November 21, 1988	Phil Collins; Florence Joyner	—N/a	New York Hilton Midtown
17th	November 20, 1989	Smothers Brothers	—N/a	Sheraton New York Times Square Hotel
18th	November 19, 1990	Peter Ustinov	—N/a	Sheraton New York Times Square Hotel
19th	November 25, 1991	Roger Moore	Arts & Entertainment Network; RAI	New York Hilton Midtown
20th	November 23, 1992	Louis Gossett Jr. María Conchita Alonso	PBS	Sheraton New York Times Square Hotel
21st	November 22, 1993	Peter Ustinov	—N/a	New York Hilton Midtown
22nd	November 21, 1994	Peter Ustinov	—N/a	New York Hilton Midtown
23rd	November 20, 1995	Peter Ustinov	NBC Super Channel; NBC Asia	New York Hilton Midtown
24th	November 25, 1996	Jamie Luner; Dick Cavett; Kenny Rogers	—N/a	New York Hilton Midtown
25th	November 24, 1997	Peter Ustinov	—N/a	New York Hilton Midtown
26th	November 23, 1998	Hans Liberg [nl]	—N/a	New York Hilton Midtown
27th	November 22, 1999	Clive Anderson	—N/a	New York Hilton Midtown
28th	November 20, 2000	Tom Bergeron	Internet	Sheraton New York Times Square Hotel
29th	November 19, 2001	Tom Bergeron	—N/a	Sheraton New York Times Square Hotel
30th	November 25, 2002	Donna Hanover	—N/a	Sheraton New York Times Square Hotel
31st	November 24, 2003	Bob Costas	—N/a	New York Hilton Midtown
32nd	November 22, 2004	Graham Norton	—N/a	New York Hilton Midtown
33rd	November 21, 2005	Graham Norton	—N/a	New York Hilton Midtown
34th	November 20, 2006	Graham Norton	—N/a	New York Hilton Midtown
35th	November 19, 2007	Roger Bart	—N/a	New York Hilton Midtown
36th	November 24, 2008	Roger Bart	—N/a	New York Hilton Midtown
37th	November 23, 2009	Graham Norton	MGM Latino (Brazil)	New York Hilton Midtown
38th	November 22, 2010	Jason Priestley	—N/a	New York Hilton Midtown
39th	November 21, 2011	Jason Priestley	—N/a	New York Hilton Midtown
40th	November 19, 2012	Regis Philbin	MGM (Portugal)	New York Hilton Midtown
41st	November 25, 2013	John Oliver	—N/a	New York Hilton Midtown
42nd	November 24, 2014	Matt Lucas	—N/a	New York Hilton Midtown
43rd	November 23, 2015	Bassem Youssef	—N/a	New York Hilton Midtown
44th	November 21, 2016	Alan Cumming	—N/a	New York Hilton Midtown
45th	November 20, 2017	Maz Jobrani	—N/a	New York Hilton Midtown
46th	November 19, 2018	Hari Kondabolu	E! Online	New York Hilton Midtown
47th	November 25, 2019	Ronny Chieng	[data missing]	New York Hilton Midtown
48th	November 23, 2020	Richard Kind	Online _{(International Emmy Awards official website)}	Hammerstein Ballroom
49th	November 22, 2021	Yvonne Orji	Online _{(International Emmy Awards official website) (Lionsgate Play)}	Great Hall of Casa Cipriani
50th	November 21, 2022	Penn Jillette	Online _{(International Emmy Awards official website)}	New York Hilton Midtown
51st	November 20, 2023	Rhys Darby	—N/a	New York Hilton Midtown
52nd	November 25, 2024	Vir Das	—N/a	New York Hilton Midtown

== See also ==
- List of International Emmy Award winners
