= United States pay television content advisory system =

Content-based television ratings system in the United States

The United States pay television content advisory system is a television content rating system developed cooperatively by the American pay television industry; it first went into effect on March 1, 1994, on cable-originated premium channels owned by the system's principal developers, Home Box Office, Inc. and Showtime Networks. The voluntary-participation system—developed to address public concerns about explicit sexual content, graphic violence and strong profanity that tend to be featured in pay-cable and pay-per-view programming—provides guidance to subscribers on the suitability of a program for certain audiences based on its content.

Used with standard age-based ratings issued per the Motion Picture Association film rating system and the TV Parental Guidelines, the system incorporates ten "content descriptors" (up to six of which can be used for an individual program) providing detailed information about the types of objectionable content contained in a motion picture or television program being aired on a particular service, including categories covering sexual content; different levels of violence, profanity and nudity; and a general-purpose category covering crude and mature humor, innuendo and/or the use of alcoholic beverages, tobacco products or drugs.

Like the TV Parental Guidelines, content ratings are determined by the individually participating pay television services. Ratings are applied to most original and acquired television series, theatrically released and made-for-cable films, documentaries and specials rated PG/TV-PG and above; until regularly televised sports events on premium cable ended with the December 2023 closure of Showtime's sports division, (Note: HBO discontinued boxing coverage in 2018, after having aired sports events in some capacity since its launch as a regional service in November 1972.) they were also often applied to certain sporting events on general-entertainment-formatted pay services, primarily to account for fleeting expletives or other mild objectionable material that could occur during the broadcast. The ratings themselves have no legal force, and are not used during promotional advertisements. While bearing similarities to the content sub-ratings added to the TV Parental Guidelines in July 1997, the advisories in this system are relatively more succinct in ascribing the mature material incorporated into a program.

Similar content guidelines have since been introduced by regional pay television industries or individual pay services outside of the U.S. (including Canada, Asia and Latin America). Within the United States, Comedy Central—which operates as a basic cable channel—has assigned "Graphic Language" advisory indicators for content bumpers on select TV-MA-rated original series (including South Park and Workaholics).

== Development and implementation ==
Prior to the system's creation and implementation, premium television services did not provide on-air content advisories at the start of a film, television series or special to notify viewers of mature subject matter included in the accordant telecast; vague illustrations of the suitability of a program for minors under age 18, depending on the program content and rating, were made using the program rating (e.g., "The following movie has been rated PG-13 by the Motion Picture Association of America. Some material may be inappropriate for young children; parents may wish to consider whether it should be viewed by those under 13" or descriptions indicating the service would air a specific program during network-designated watersheds, such as "HBO/Cinemax will show this feature only at night", for R-rated movies and unrated programs containing equivalent material (Note: Quote referenced is an example of the aforementioned descriptions that HBO and Cinemax used in rating bumpers immediately preceding film presentations from 1984 to 1986; in 1989, HBO and Cinemax simplified the audio-visual formatting of their ratings bumpers to "The following movie is rated [rating]," which became the standard format for the American premium cable industry.)). Instead of showing on-air advisories, premium services chose to put content labels of relative detail (e.g., "violence, profanity") in the synopses of program highlights and end-of-issue program summaries within the monthly program guides supplied to their subscribers and to lodging sites.

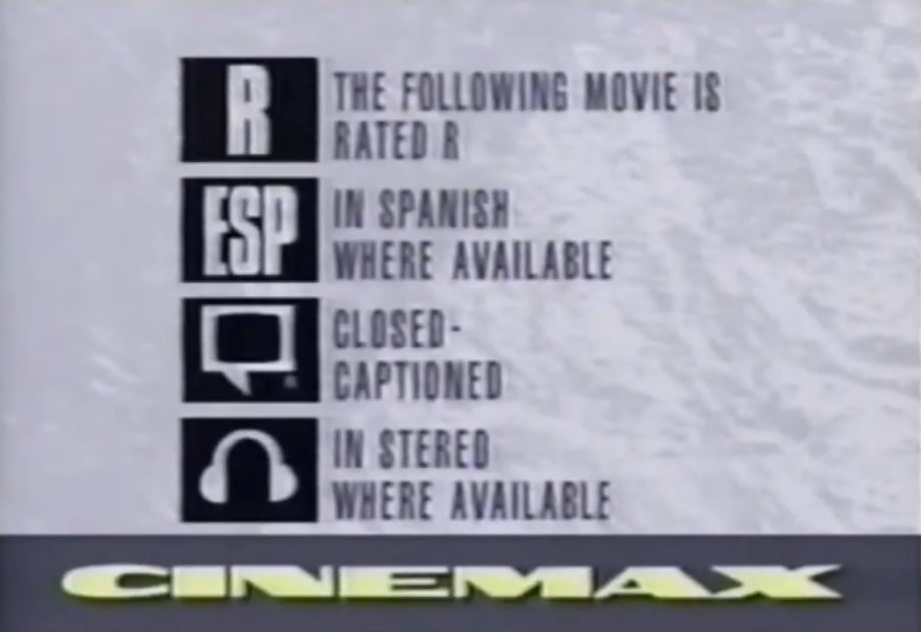
Example of a pre-system ratings bumper; the above format was used by Cinemax from March to June 1994; HBO and Cinemax had begun indicating accessibility features (closed captioning, stereo sound and alternate Spanish audio feeds) using custom icons in 1989, but this was the first prototype of the ratings-combined-with-ratings-reason-bumpers that Cinemax and Showtime were experimenting with.

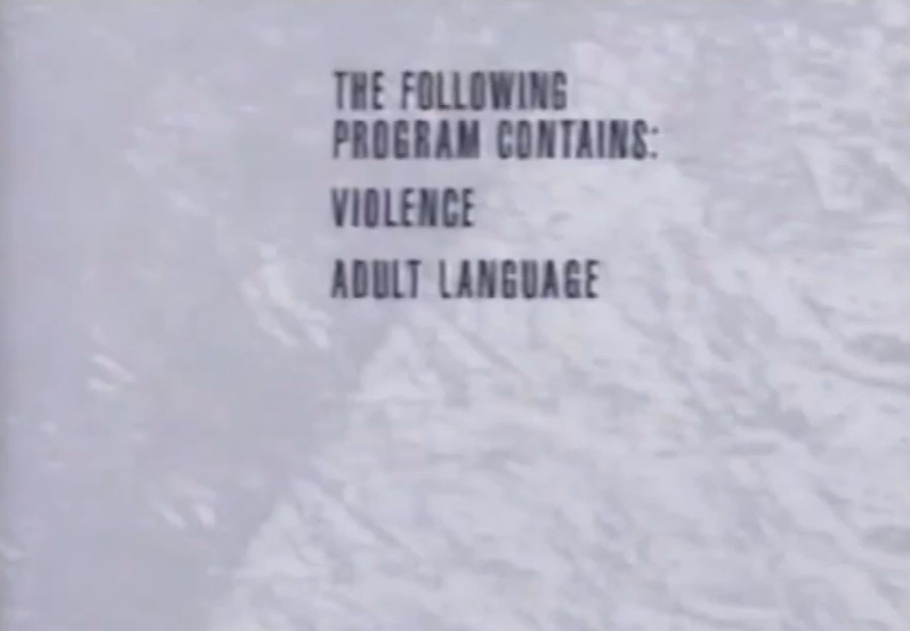
Example of a pre-system content advisory bumper; the above format was used by Cinemax from February to June 1994; for the R-rated movie being presented, Cinemax assigned advisories for the film's depictions of intense violence (which would be assigned the "V" code upon the current system's implementation) and adult language (which would be assigned the code "AL").

In January 1994, amid parental concerns regarding the amount of violent content featured in premium cable and other television programming, representatives from the pay-cable television industry voluntarily pledged to establish a content advisory system to provide information to parents about program content that may be unsuitable for their children. This became structured as a system derived from the advisories published in their proprietary program guides, assigning individual ratings corresponding to the types of objectionable content depicted in a given program (categorized based on violence, profanity, sexuality or miscellaneous forms of mature material inapplicable to the other categories). The initial system adopted by the pay services of Home Box Office, Inc. (HBO and Cinemax) and Showtime Networks (Showtime, The Movie Channel and Flix) on March 1, 1994, consisted strictly of descriptive text outlining the mature material included the following telecast; the cooperative members featured the indicators—which initially differed slightly between the two parent companies—in the rating bumpers immediately preceding each program.

On June 10, 1994, the Home Box Office and Showtime Networks services introduced a revised, uniform system: a set of block icons incorporating one of ten content codes—each two-to-three letters in length, and displayed in bold Fixedsys type—was added to supplement the applicable descriptive text, which was uniformly featured in a separate "page" of the rating bumper. (Since Home Box Office, Inc. adopted the practice in 2015, most premium services—except the Showtime Networks, which previously used the style from June 1994 to March 1995—have used a bumper format displaying the age-based rating, content advisories and audio/visual accessibility features on a single page.) Under the new system, each advisory label was placed into one of four categories: violence ("MV" for "mild violence", "V" for "violence", "GV" for "graphic violence" and "RP" for "rape"), suggestive or explicit sexual material ("BN" for "brief nudity", "N" for "nudity" and "SSC" for "strong sexual content"), profane language ("AL" for "adult language" and "GL" for "graphic language") and a generalized descriptor for mature material that does not fit into the other categories ("AC" for "adult content"). Of the participating pay services, Showtime Networks was the only member in the cooperative to have its continuity announcers (including Bill St. James for Showtime and John Beach for The Movie Channel) read the advisory ratings, in addition to the then-commonplace announcement of the program ratings, utilizing such announcements during ratings bumpers until the Fall of 1997.

Example of a content advisory bumper using the system's formerly standard Fixedsys block icons. (Note: Most of the content advisory system's participants—HBO (2006), Cinemax (2004), Showtime (2011), Starz (2002), Starz Encore (2005) and Movieplex (2005)—retired the original 1994 icon set during the 2000s and early 2010s, in favor of their own modernized icon styles; MGM+ and Screenpix, meanwhile, have used custom advisory icons since their respective launches in 2009 (as Epix) and 2018. Showtime Networks fully retired the original 1994 set (which, since 2011, had been limited to select Showtime multiplex channels, The Movie Channel and Flix) in December 2023, becoming the last of the system's participants to cease using that icon style.) The above image was from a 1995 HBO telecast of Ace Ventura: Pet Detective (1994; MPAA rating: PG-13); HBO assigned advisories for the film's depictions of violence (V), brief nudity (BN), adult content (AC) and adult language (AL).

Liberty Media-owned pay services Starz (which launched on April 1 that year) and Encore soon followed in implementing the system by September 1994, and by early 1997, it was in use across several of the major pay-per-view services, including Viewer's Choice (later In Demand) and Request TV. Since then, the system has also been implemented by Sundance Channel (until its conversion to a basic cable channel in 2008), MoviePlex, and Epix (now MGM+). HBO, Cinemax, Showtime and Starz also include content advisories at the start of on-demand program selections over their respective video-on-demand and OTT services; present exceptions are streaming services HBO Max (owned by HBO parent Warner Bros. Discovery) and Paramount+ (owned by Showtime parent Paramount Skydance), which respectively carry HBO and Showtime's individual content libraries (and use a wider array of descriptors that specify material normally covered by the system's broad-based "Adult Content" indicator), (Note: Showtime's former licensed subscription channels for Apple TV, The Roku Channel and Prime Video Channels instead applied the generic descriptors created for the TV Parental Guidelines (which are used by the streaming marketplaces as a default advisory system), including for MPA-rated theatrical films.) and MGM+/Screenpix's VOD and streaming services (which do not use content advisory descriptors for on-demand titles, with the channel restricting their use to its live feeds).

Programs are labeled at the discretion of each pay television service's parent unit; because of this, as an example, a film labeled by HBO and Cinemax with a "GV" (graphic violence) advisory rating could conceivably be labeled with a "V" rating (usually indicating a moderate amount of violent content) if it were to air on Showtime, The Movie Channel and Flix. McAdory Lipscomb, former executive vice president of Showtime, described how the advisories are applied: "It is possible that [Showtime] would rank something different than HBO, but we both recognize our dual responsibility to provide information to our subscribers about what is graphic or perhaps unsuitable for children, and we think the common language we've developed will provide an acceptable parameter." A November 1996 survey conducted by the University of Wisconsin–Madison and sponsored by the National PTA and the Institute for Mental Health Initiatives showed that 80% of parents who participated in the survey preferred the pay television industry's content advisory system, assessing that it provided clearer detail of potentially objectionable content included in an individual program compared to age-based ratings systems like the MPAA's system for theatrical films.

== Usage of advisory system ==
Cable-originated premium services can assign as many as five (among the ten overall) content indicators for an individual program to advise viewers of whether its content is appropriate for minors, depending on age group, or adults with particular sensitivities to certain kinds of mature content. (Note: As an example, HBO/Cinemax assigned the unrated version of the 2010 comedy Get Him to the Greek—assigned a "TV-MA-L,S,V" rating by the services, but originally rated "R" for its theatrical release—indicators for adult content (for pervasive sexual dialogue, drug references, moderate alcohol and drug use, and crude humor); strong sexual content (for two separate scenes in which secondary lead character Aaron Green (Jonah Hill) had non-nude intercourse with different women, and had a dildo forcibly inserted orally and rubbed on his face); graphic language (for the film’s use of ~150 expletives); and nudity (for two scenes involving topless women and one that featured partially exposed male buttocks).)

Softcore pornographic films have usually been assigned advisory labels for strong sexual content (SC) and nudity (N), in addition to adult content (AC) and adult language (AL), although some, have been tagged for violent content. Because they rarely include even mildly objectionable content fitting advisory criteria, premium services usually do not assign content labels for G-/TV-G-rated programs.

=== Advisory labels ===
Content rating	Meaning	Minimum rating used	Depicted content
	Adult Content	PG/TV-PG (sometimes used for G/TV-G-rated programs)	Used for objectionable material that does not fit the other content categories, it suggests that the program contains some combination of suggestive dialogue, crude humor, drug references, depiction of substance use (e.g., underage alcohol consumption, use of recreational or hard drugs) or intense miscellaneous subject matter that may not be suitable for children. For films and television programs that are rated PG-13/TV-14 or R/TV-MA (or of the hard R/18 [in the UK] variety), this can also be applicable to sex scenes that are not quite explicit, realistic or strong. (HBO and Cinemax originally labeled content indicative of this descriptor as "Adult Situations" from February to June 1994.)
	Adult Language	PG/TV-PG (sometimes used for G/TV-G, PG-13/TV-14 and R/TV-MA-rated programs)	The program contains relatively mild to moderate amounts of profane language—ranging from milder profanities (e.g., "damn", "prick", "ass") to expletives (e.g., "shit", "fuck", "asshole"), regardless of the meaning or intent of the words being used.
	Graphic Language	R/TV-MA	The program contains explicit use of profanity—particularly involving more than four uses of at least two explicit expletives (e.g., "fuck/motherfucker", "dick"/"cock", "cunt"/“pussy”), regardless of pejorative or sexual intent of usage, including racial slurs.
	Mild Violence	PG/TV-PG (seldom used for R/TV-MA and PG-13/TV-14-rated content)	The program contains limited depictions of violent content, regardless of intent for comedic or dramatic effect; violence depicted may include bloodshed of an inexplicit nature.
	Violence	PG/TV-PG (seldom used for G/TV-G, PG-13/TV-14 and R/TV-MA-rated content)	The program contains moderate to severe depictions of violence (such as a physical altercation, shooting or stabbing); intense violence depicted may include mild to moderate amounts of bloodshed, but may not necessarily account for depictions of gore or dismemberment. It can also be applied, for music videos and stand-up comedy specials with outright references to violence, even if not accompanied by depictions. (Note: Examples include Steve Harvey: One Man (1997)).
	Graphic Violence	R/TV-MA (rarely used for PG-13/TV-14-rated content)	The program incorporates depictions of intense and gruesome violence—containing gore and grisly imagery, including depictions of impalement, decapitation and/or dismemberment, and applied based on the length and/or number of scenes it is shown—that is unsuited for younger audiences or persons sensitive to exposure of the described stimuli. It can also be used for music videos and stand-up comedy specials that include more gruesome references to violence. (Note: Examples include Martin Lawrence: You So Crazy (1994) and Steve Harvey: Don't Trip... He Ain't Through with Me Yet (2006); although the latter film was rated PG, incorporated, like movies rated or series containing content equivalent to the current TV-PG rating during the 1980s, incorporated very objectionable material that would be considered for a PG-13 rating today.)
	Brief Nudity	PG-13/TV-14 (sometimes used for PG/TV-PG and R/TV-MA-rated programs)	The program includes scenes containing nudity of limited duration, depicted in a non-sexual or implied sexual nature (such as a brief glimpse of a man's buttocks), which may not necessarily be shown full-frontally.
	Nudity	PG-13/TV-14 (sometimes used for R/TV-MA-rated programs)	The program includes scenes containing nudity of frequent and/or extended duration—either partial or full-frontal, and regardless of artistic or sexual depiction—as limited as depictions of female toplessness or exposed male buttocks, up to apparent visible genitalia. Because scenes with frank sexual depictions—simulated or graphic—often include partial or full-frontal nudity, softcore pornographic and mainstream programs incorporating scenes of sexual intercourse (such as those in the latter category have been/are shown on Cinemax, Showtime and The Movie Channel) typically utilize this label in conjunction with the "strong sexual content" advisory.
	Strong Sexual Content	R/TV-MA	The program contains scenes depicting sexual intercourse—whether simulated or realistic, whether accompanied by nudity, and which may include inferences of a person in the scene receiving oral sex—in a frank and graphic nature not suitable for persons under age 18; the applicable scenes may be of either a pornographic nature or, if a mainstream or art work, depicted in a realistic and artistic manner. Because scenes with frank sexual depictions—simulated or graphic—often include partial (e.g., a female with exposed breasts wearing clothing covering only the top half of her body in the scene) or full-frontal nudity, softcore pornographic and mainstream programs incorporating scenes of sexual intercourse (such as those in the latter category that have been/are shown on HBO, Cinemax, Showtime, The Movie Channel, Flix, Starz and Starz Encore) typically utilize this label in conjunction with the "nudity" advisory. MGM+ (formerly Epix) uses an expanded definition of this descriptor, merely labeled "Sexual Content (SC)", which encompasses depictions of less explicit sexual situations applicable to content below R/TV-MA criteria.
	Rape	R/TV-MA	The program depicts violent, realistic scenes of rape and/or other forms of sexual assault—in a fictional context—unsuited for younger audiences or persons particularly sensitive to depictions of sexual abuse. References to sexual assault or rape that do not graphically depict such acts typically fit the intense subject matter criteria under Adult Content (AC) as intense subject matter where discretion for the aforementioned groups and usage in content below R/TV-MA criteria may vary. (Note: An example in which applying this label can be complicated is Lean on Me (1989), which features an intense scene involving implied (borderline) rape that could have resulted in the film being given an R rating (likely deeming it a "hard" R in respect to this scene), but was only assigned a PG-13 rating because of its educational nature; had an unrated version (which would be rated TV-MA-DLV if aired on a pay service) been released, the "rape" indicator could be assigned due to the aforementioned scene.)

Discontinued content ratings (used by HBO and Cinemax from February to June 1994):

Content rating	Minimum rating used	Depicted content
Adult Humor	PG (or for equivalent content on TV series; sometimes used for G-rated movies, or equivalent TV series that included mild objectionable humor)	The program contained mild to moderate amounts of adult and crude humor, including moderate scatalogical/urination (R-rated), mucus (PG-rated), flatulence (PG-13-rated) or any related humor, or moderate blue humor (such as jokes related to or depictions of slapping butts or innuendo-laced phrases like "ding dong"). (Note: Examples of films that would have qualified for this descriptor include Home Alone 2 (during a Cinemax airing in May 1994); rap and rock music videos were also assigned this label (including a Cinemax airing of the video for Danger Danger's "Monkey Business" and an HBO airing of the video for Ugly Kid Joe's "Neighbor").)
Graphic Humor	R (or for equivalent content on TV series)	The program contained graphic scatalogical/urination humor and/or sexually explicit or graphic blue humor (such as genitalia-related jokes). (Note: Examples of films that would have qualified for this descriptor include the Cinemax airings of GoodFellas (exclusive premiere) and Dice Rules.)

=== Ratings-based usage ===
Note: Content advisories are not applied to TV-Y-rated programming, as the subject material for programs assigned with the rating is oriented mainly to young children up to seven years of age.

Movie/TV rating	AC (Adult content)	AL (Adult language)	GL (Graphic language)	MV (Mild violence)	V (Violence)	GV (Graphic violence)	BN (Brief nudity)	N (Nudity)	SC (Strong sexual content)	RP (Rape)
TV-Y7	✗	✗	✗	✓ (occasional; fantasy-based)	✓ (occasional; fantasy-based)	✗	✗	✗	✗	✗
G/TV-G	✓ (very rare)	✓ (very rare)	✗	✓ (rare)	✓ (very rare)	✗	✗	✗	✗	✗
PG/TV-PG	✓	✓	✗	✓	✓	✗	✓ (rare)	✓ (very rare)	✗	✗
PG-13/TV-14	✓	✓	✗	✓	✓	✓ (rare)	✓ (occasional)	✓ (occasional)	✗	✗
R/NC-17/TV-MA	✓	✓	✓	✓ (rare)	✓	✓	✓	✓	✓	✓

== See also ==
- Motion Picture Association film rating system
- TV Parental Guidelines
