= 1974 Emmy Awards =

1974 Emmy Awards may refer to:

- 26th Primetime Emmy Awards, the 1974 Emmy Awards ceremony honoring primetime programming
- 1st Daytime Emmy Awards, the 1974 Emmy Awards ceremony honoring daytime programming
- 2nd International Emmy Awards, the 1974 Emmy Awards ceremony honoring international programming

Preceded by 1973	Emmy Awards; 1974	Succeeded by 1975
