= The Movie Channel =

American movie-oriented pay television network

- Type: Pay television network
- Country: United States
- Broadcast area: Nationwide
- Headquarters: New York City

Programming
- Languages: English; Spanish (as SAP option; some films may be broadcast in their native language and subtitled in English)
- Picture format: 1080i (HDTV) (downscaled to letterboxed 480i for the SDTV feed
- Timeshift service: The Movie Channel East; The Movie Channel West; The Movie Channel Xtra East; The Movie Channel Xtra West

Ownership
- Owner: Skydance Global Cable Media (Skydance)
- Parent: Showtime Networks
- Key people: Chris McCarthy (chairman/CEO, Showtime Networks); Michael Crotty (EVP/CFO, Showtime Networks); Tom Christie (COO, Showtime Networks)
- Sister channels: Cinemax; HBO; Showtime; Flix

History
- Launched: February 8, 1973; 53 years ago; (original launch, as Star Channel); December 3, 1979; 46 years ago; (relaunch, as The Movie Channel)
- Former names: TMC: Star Channel (1973–1979); TMC Xtra: The Movie Channel 2 (1997–2001)

Links
- Website: www.sho.com/the-movie-channel

Availability

Streaming media
- Affiliated Streaming Service: Paramount+

The Movie Channel (often abbreviated as TMC) is an American premium television network owned by Showtime Networks, a division of Skydance operated through its Global Cable Media division. Not including CBS, it is the oldest network owned by Skydance. The Movie Channel's programming mainly features first-run theatrically released and independently produced motion pictures, and during promotional breaks between films, special behind-the-scenes features and movie trivia. Originally operated and sold as a standalone service (launching as Star Channel in February 1973), at present, The Movie Channel is receivable to pay television subscribers primarily as part of the multiplex tier of parent network Showtime. The channel, along with its parent network Showtime and sister network Flix, is headquartered at Paramount Plaza on the northern end of New York City's Broadway district.

== History ==
=== Early history (1973–1979) ===
The Movie Channel traces its history to the development of Gridtronics, a pay television service which delivered videotaped feature films to cable systems throughout the United States. The concept was originally developed in the late 1960s by Alfred Stern and Gordon Fuqua, both executives at multiple system operator Television Communications Corporation (TVC) at the time, as part of a multi-channel service that was designed to include channels focusing on the arts, instructional programming and medical programs. The video-to-cable movie delivery concept was presented by Fuqua and Stern at the 1969 National Cable Television Association Convention. Over the course of the next several years, the two men subsequently discussed carriage agreements with other cable providers to distribute Gridtronics and engaged in discussions with various film studios to provide film content for the service. At the time of restructuring, TVC was purchased by Kinney National Company, the parent company of Warner Bros., in 1971, and gave the service the financial funding and content that it needed to launch.

Kinney National Company's successor, Warner Communications, launched the Star Channel service to ten cable systems operated by Warner Cable Communications on February 8, 1973, with showings of The Candidate and Escape from the Planet of the Apes interspersed with film trailers and travelogues. Star Channel was developed as a vehicle to promote the Warner Bros. film library (notably excluding the pre-1950 film library that was owned by United Artists at the time). It would eventually be made available on Warner-Amex's experimental QUBE interactive service when the company launched it in 1977. Cable providers sometimes experienced technical problems trying to transmit the delivered tapes to viewers, especially when the tapes jammed during playback.

=== National expansion as The Movie Channel (1979–1983) ===
On January 1, 1979, Star Channel became a nationally distributed service after it was uplinked to satellite, becoming the third premium service to be distributed nationally through such a transmission method (after HBO, which was uplinked to satellite in September 1975, and Showtime, which was uplinked in March 1978). In April of that year, it began to share channel and transponder space with Warner Cable's newly launched children's network, Nickelodeon (an outgrowth of the company's former QUBE channel C-3 programming service, which had Pinwheel as its flagship program); this resulted in the latter service switching to an encrypted signal during the regularly scheduled network transition at 10:00 p.m. Eastern and Pacific Time on weekdays and 8:00 p.m. on weekends; Star Channel originally signed off at 4:00 am. Eastern and Pacific, three hours before the transponder space reverted to use by Nickelodeon. The channels were originally uplinked from a facility located next to WIVB-TV in Buffalo, New York; both later moved downstate to Hauppauge by 1981 (after a planned expansion to the Buffalo facility was scrapped following an inability to reach a long-term lease deal with WIVB's ownership).

On September 14 of that year, American Express reached an agreement with Warner Communications to buy 50% of Warner Cable Corporation for $175 million in cash and short-term notes. Through the formation of the joint venture, which was incorporated in December 1979, Star Channel and Nickelodeon were folded into Warner-Amex Satellite Entertainment (later Warner-Amex Cable Communications), a company which handled the operations of the group's cable channels (Warner Cable was folded into a separate jointly owned unit, the Warner Cable Corporation). Warner-Amex executive John A. Schneider served as the company's president; other Warner-Amex staff that composed Star/The Movie Channel's initial management team included executive vice president John Lack, programming chief Robert Pittman, and Fred Seibert, who was in charge of developing on-air promotions.

On December 3, 1979, the network was relaunched as The Movie Channel; the first feature film to be broadcast on the relaunched service was the 1953 comedy Roman Holiday. On January 1, 1980, TMC discontinued its time-lease arrangement with Nickelodeon (then a sister network under the Warner, and later Viacom umbrellas) and became a 24-hour standalone service. At that point, TMC became the first premium channel to air R-rated films during the daytime hours (HBO continues to not air any R-rated films on its primary channel before 8:00 pm. Eastern and Pacific Time as of 2017, except occasionally for films aired as part of its Sunday late-afternoon rebroadcast of the preceding Saturday's prime time movie premiere; TMC sister network Showtime, Cinemax, and now-defunct rival Spotlight did not run R-rated films during the daytime hours at the time, the former two surviving services would not schedule them before prime time until the late 1980s/early 1990s while another now-defunct rival Home Theater Network never ran any R-rated films by mode of that service's family-oriented format).

In 1981, The Movie Channel became one of the first television channels to broadcast movies in stereophonic audio; from that point until 1988, films presented in stereo were verbally and visually denoted in prime time lineup bumpers shown during promotional breaks within its daytime schedule – with titles for films available in stereo accompanied by the now-standard headphone symbol – and, until 1985, in a custom version of its feature presentation opening sequence (thereafter, films transmitted in the format were denoted along with the film rating during the latter open). As the standard for television broadcasts in stereo was a few years away, cable operators had to simulcast the multichannel audio feed through cable radio decoders using FM receivers. Interstitial segments that aired during breaks between films for much of the 1980s included Behind the Scenes (featuring biographies and interviews with actors appearing in films set to air on the network or being released theatrically), The Heart of Hollywood (borrowing its name from the slogan that TMC used concurrently during the segment's run from September 1985 to May 1988, and featuring more in-depth interviews with film stars), Reel Shorts (a showcase of live action and animated short films, which continued to air during extended breaks until 1991, by then under the "Film Shorts" moniker) and Reel Hits (featuring music videos for songs featured in films of that period and their accompanying soundtracks).

=== Operational merger with Showtime (1983–1985) ===
For much of its early years, The Movie Channel struggled in a race for subscribers in a pay television industry that pitted it against as many as seven cable-originated competitors, and even some over-the-air subscription services transmitted over independent stations in many U.S. cities such as ONTV and SelecTV. In addition to the launch of Cinemax as then-HBO parent Time Inc.'s movie-focused competitor to TMC in August 1980, the competition grew when Warner-Amex and Rainbow Media jointly launched the film and arts-focused Bravo (now a general entertainment basic cable channel, with a reality television focus) in September 1980; Walt Disney Productions threw itself into the fray when it announced plans in early 1982 to launch family-oriented Disney Channel, a service which made its debut in April 1983 (it is now a basic cable channel, focusing mainly on children's programming).

In August 1982, MCA Inc. (then-owner of Universal Pictures), Gulf and Western Industries (then-owner of Paramount Pictures) and Warner Communications reached an agreement to jointly acquire TMC, under which the three companies would acquire a combined controlling 75% interest in the service (with each holding a 25% ownership stake) from Warner-Amex Satellite Entertainment. The proposal was guided by the motive of the studios wanting to increase their revenue share for licensing movie rights to premium television services; there were also concerns by the major studios that HBO's dominance of that market and its pre-buying of pay cable rights to films prior to their theatrical release would result in an undue balance of negotiating power over them by HBO, resulting in a lower than suitable licensing fee rate that would be paid to the distributors for individual titles. The three companies officially announced their agreement in principle to acquire interests in The Movie Channel on November 11, 1982. Subsequently, in late December of that year, the U.S. Department of Justice (which had blocked a similar attempt by MCA, Gulf+Western, 20th Century Fox and Columbia Pictures to create a competing pay service, Premiere, in an antitrust case ruling less than two years earlier in January 1981) launched a routine preliminary inquiry into the proposed partnership.

On January 7, 1983, Viacom International added itself as a partner and drafted an amendment to the proposal to consolidate The Movie Channel with the company's own competing premium service, Showtime (which Viacom had wholly acquired in August 1982, after buying out Group W Cable's 50% interest in Showtime for $75 million). Under the revised proposal, the four studios would each own a 22.58% stake in the two networks, with American Express owning a 9.68% minority interest. In addition, the consortium would appoint a management team separate from those employed by the two channels – which would continue to operate as separate services – to operate the joint venture. However, the deal ran into regulatory hurdles since Warner, Universal and Paramount received 50% of their respective total revenue from film releases and licensing fees from premium services; furthermore, Showtime and TMC combined would control about 30% of the pay cable marketplace, creating an oligopoly with HBO (which, in conjunction with Cinemax, controlled 60% of the market).

After a four-month investigation resulted in the Department of Justice filing a civil antitrust lawsuit against the five parties to block the Showtime-TMC merger on June 10, 1983, the Department asked Warner and American Express to restructure the deal during hearings for the case. The Department's decision – citing concerns, including some expressed by HBO management, that combining the assets of Showtime and TMC would stifle competition in the sale of their programming and that of other pay cable services to cable providers – was despite the fact that, under the original proposal, MCA, Gulf+Western, and Warner had each agreed to continue licensing films released by their respective movie studios to competing pay television networks. The partners involved in the merger would also set standard prices for films that were acquired for broadcast on The Movie Channel and Showtime, either those produced by the studio partners or by unassociated film studios. To address the Justice Department's concerns over the deal, the four partners submitted another revised proposal for consideration on July 19, that included guarantees of conduct agreeing that Paramount, Universal and Warner Bros. would not receive higher residual licensing payments for films acquired by Showtime and TMC than that paid by other studios, and that all four partners would not permit the two channels in the venture to pay lower fees for films produced by the three studio partners than that paid by smaller pay television services for the same films.

After the revised proposal was rejected on July 28, Warner Communications and American Express restructured the purchase to include only Viacom as a partner, bowing Gulf+Western and MCA out of the proposed partnership. The changes – which Justice Department officials acknowledged would "prevent any anti-competitive effect from arising" following the merger, by allowing other premium services to enter the market should the venture significantly raise licensing fee prices for films – led the Justice Department to drop its challenge to the merger agreement on August 12; the department formally approved the deal the following day on August 13. When the deal was completed on September 6, 1983, the operations of The Movie Channel and Showtime were folded into a new holding company, Showtime/The Movie Channel, Inc., which was majority owned by Viacom (controlling 50% of the venture's common stock as well as investing $40 million in cash), with Warner Communications (which owned 31%) and Warner-Amex (which owned the remaining 19% interest) as minority partners (the operational arrangement between The Movie Channel and Showtime is of a similar relationship to that between rival pay service Starz and its progenitor Starz Encore; as with Starz Encore to Starz, TMC operates as a secondary service to Showtime even though its launch, under the Star Channel brand, predates that of its parent network – Showtime launched on July 1, 1976 – by three years).

The Showtime-TMC joint venture also benefited The Movie Channel by allowing for the group to expand the channel's distribution. On December 12, 1983, the Times-Mirror Company announced that it would sell the subscriber base and transponder rights assigned to competing premium service Spotlight to Showtime-The Movie Channel, Inc. for an undisclosed price. Under the agreement, the four cable providers that backed the Spotlight venture – Times Mirror Cable, Storer Cable, Cox Cable and Tele-Communications Inc. (TCI) – would offer Spotlight subscribers who subscribe to any of the systems an option to subscribe to either Showtime or The Movie Channel as a replacement, with those dissatisfied with Showtime/TMC's program offerings following a two-month sampling period during February and March permitted to exchange it for another premium channel at no charge. After Spotlight ceased operations on February 1, 1984, Spotlight subscribers who subscribed to any of the participating systems began to automatically receive The Movie Channel in markets where a provider was already carrying Showtime. (In select Spotlight markets, Showtime was added to the provider as a replacement instead if neither service had been carried prior.) Showtime-The Movie Channel President Michael Weinblatt estimated that approximately 100,000 subscribers of the four partner systems already received either Showtime or TMC, and that the absorption of Spotlight would increase the total number of paid subscribers to both channels by at least 650,000 to about eight million subscribers nationwide.

=== Transfer to Viacom (1985–2005) ===
On August 10, 1985, after Time Inc. and cable provider Tele-Communications Inc. (TCI) jointly submitted a bid to buy the company for $900 million and the assumption of $500 million in debt as well as an earlier offer by American Express the previous month to buy out Warner's share of the company (under a clause in the agreement that allowed either company the option of buying out their partner's stake in Warner-Amex), Warner Communications exercised an option to acquire American Express' 50% share of Warner-Amex Cable Communications for $450 million. Among the options, barring that it chose to sell Viacom a 50% interest in the company for $450 million, the deal originally excluded Warner-Amex's 19% interest in Showtime-The Movie Channel, Inc.; that interest would have reverted to Warner, which intended to operate Warner-Amex as a wholly owned subsidiary.

Two weeks later on August 26, Viacom acquired Warner Communications and Warner-Amex's combined 50% ownership interest in Showtime/The Movie Channel, Inc. as well as full ownership of Warner-Amex and the public shareholder interests in MTV Networks for $671.7 million. This gave Viacom exclusive ownership of both premium channels through its $500 million cash payment and acquisition of 1.625 million shares for Warner's 31% stake in Showtime/The Movie Channel, and Warner-Amex's 19% interest in the unit and its 60% interest in MTV Networks (Viacom had owned Showtime alone or jointly with other companies – previously in ventures with TelePrompTer Corporation, and later briefly, its successor Group W Cable – from the time it launched in July 1976). The buyout, part of an option given by Warner in its purchase of American Express' interest in MTV, was exercised in part to finance much of the buyout of Showtime/The Movie Channel without borrowing any money. The subsidiary would eventually be renamed Showtime Networks, Inc. in 1988. Ironically, four years after the company sold its interests in Showtime and The Movie Channel, Warner Communications would acquire competitors HBO and Cinemax, when the company merged with Time Inc. in 1989 to form Time Warner.

In May 1986, TMC began incorporating regular on-air hosts to present the channel's afternoon and evening film presentations, and provide backstory on the production of those scheduled to be shown; the channel began using hosts on a regular basis after employing celebrity guest presenters to host special showcase stunts in the fall of 1985 (The Movie Channel would continue to feature guest hosts, such as Ron Howard, Daphne Zuniga, Shirley Jones and Frank Zappa, for programming stunts through much of the late 1980s after it hired full-time presenters). Hosts appearing on the channel between the late 1980s and the mid-1990s included Robert Osborne (then also working as a columnist for The Hollywood Reporter, and who also hosted the channel's Heart of Hollywood behind-the-scenes and interview interstitials), Michelle Russell, Lauren Graham and Joe Bob Briggs (the pseudonym of actor and film critic John Irving Bloom, and host of the popular Saturday evening B-movie showcase Joe Bob's Drive-In Theater).

==== Format evolution and carriage issues ====
Former logo used from May 1, 1988, to August 1, 1997; several variants of the "eye and profile" design, using different facial expressions, were used during this period. The logo was designed by Noel Frankel, with creative directors Alan Goodman and Fred Seibert of Fred/Alan, Inc.

The Movie Channel underwent a significant rebranding on May 1, 1988, which in addition to introducing a new "eye and profile" logo designed by Noel Frankel of Fred/Alan, Inc., also saw the introduction of a revamped programming schedule designed to cater to movie fans, maintaining a block scheduling structure for its entire film lineup that was organized by genre or film selection; among the blocks included were the "TMC Classic", a weekday morning and Sunday overnight block of films from the 1930s to the 1960s; "Dramarama", a weekday late-morning block of drama films; "The Laffternoon Movie", a weekday late-afternoon block of comedy films; and two action film-focused blocks (the "Action Attraction", which aired Monday through Fridays in the mid-afternoon, and the weekly prime time showcase "Friday Night Action").

The most distinct block was the "Weekend Multiplex", featuring a set lineup of different movies aired in a scheduling format inspired by movie theaters, comprising a main daytime block on Saturdays and Sundays, seven individual prime time blocks on Friday through Sunday evenings (encompassing three per night between 7:00 p.m. and 1:00 am. Eastern and Pacific Time) and themed editions of the existing "VCR Overnight" block (including the "All Night Drive-In" – a spin-off of "Joe Bob's Drive-In Theater" – on Fridays, film marathons on Saturdays and the Sunday edition of "TMC Classics"). The centerpiece of the "Weekend Multiplex" was the "TMC Top Attraction", a film making its premiere on the channel that was scheduled at different, progressively earlier time slots each evening throughout the weekend. With the exception of "Joe Bob's Drive-In Theater" (which remained on Saturday nights until it was discontinued in February 1996) and the "VCR Overnight" block (which was reduced to Wednesday overnights only in 1997), most of these blocks were discontinued in May 1991.

With the scheduling revamp, TMC greatly increased the number of films it aired on a monthly basis, from about 40 to more than 100 titles per month, with the addition of older films to the slate (which were presented without colorization, in direct contrast to Cinemax, which at the time had aired remastered color versions of some classic films on its schedule). In addition, TMC began incorporating trailers for current and upcoming feature films released initially for theatrical exhibition, which aired during promotional breaks between films until 1997. It also began airing a 15-second daily entertainment news interstitial focusing on the film industry, The Movie Channel News, featuring stories read by a continuity announcer – which varied depending on the segment – over a segment title graphic; the segment would be discontinued in May 1991.

Although extended promotional breaks were shown in a somewhat limited form beforehand, partially as a result of the changes that occurred in 1988, breaks between individual feature presentations on the channel sometimes ran as long as 20 minutes, and even up to 25 minutes in rare cases, depending on the scheduled airtime of the next film (which was denoted on a minute-based countdown ticker graphic that persisted within breaks from May 1988 to August 1997; Showtime would implement a similar countdown graphic for the next scheduled program as part of a branding update in January 1990, which that network would discontinue following its August 1997 rebrand). The Movie Channel temporarily truncated the length of its promotional breaks to five minutes or less in an on-air strategical test during February and March 1993, dispensing of fixed start times at the top and bottom of the hour – at which most of TMC's weekday daytime film telecasts had been scheduled, along with some films aired in other dayparts, since the 1988 format revamp – in favor of airtimes set at top-of-the-hour, bottom-of-the-hour and random five-minute intervals regardless of daypart. After results from the test measured an increase in audience retention for other films with the strategy, the channel instituted the limited break lengths on a regular basis in August of that year; TMC abandoned the break limits in 1997. The break limits imposed by the channel resulted in TMC reducing the number of internally produced interstitial segments that it aired during promotional breaks, with interstitials airing over the next four years consisting mainly of trailers and shorter-length behind-the-scenes segments for upcoming and current films produced by their originating studios.

On March 1, 1994, The Movie Channel and Showtime in conjunction with rivals HBO and Cinemax implemented a cooperative content advisory system to provide to parents specific information about pay-cable programming content that may be unsuitable for their children; the development of the system—inspired by the advisory ratings featured in program guides distributed by the major premium cable services—was in response to concerns from parents and advocacy groups about violent content on television, allowing Showtime Networks and other premium services discretionary authority to assign individual ratings corresponding to the objectionable content depicted in specific programs (and categorized based on violence, profanity, sexuality or miscellaneous mature material). A revised system—centered around ten content codes of two to three letters in length—was implemented by TMC and the other participating premium services on June 10, 1994.

Although TMC was carried by most subscription television providers, there were some that did not have agreements to carry the channel, even if they already carried Showtime. As an example, now-defunct satellite provider PrimeStar never carried The Movie Channel; weeks after it announced a new carriage agreement with Viacom in January 1999 that would have resulted in the channel joining the provider's lineup, PrimeStar sold its assets to Hughes Communications (then-owners of competitor DirecTV, which would neither carry Viacom's premium and basic-tier services nor Time Warner's premium channels until its 1999 acquisition of United States Satellite Broadcasting). In May 1994, TCI dropped The Movie Channel from more than 30 of the cable provider's service markets. At the time, Viacom was in the midst of an antitrust lawsuit against TCI on accusations that the provider engaged in a "conspiracy to eliminate" Showtime and its sister channels (including TMC) and pressuring Viacom to settle its lawsuit through the negotiation of a carriage contract with the media company that expired in January 1993; Viacom reportedly stated that TCI threatened to hurt both Showtime and TMC unless Viacom agreed to purchase an ownership stake in Encore (now Starz Encore), a network which Viacom claimed to have first conceptually conceived four years earlier during negotiations between the two companies that, if they had been successful, would have resulted in TCI purchasing 50% of Showtime Networks. Representatives for the affected TCI systems said that the decision to remove The Movie Channel from their lineups was made at the local level and was not a directive by company management. Viacom and TCI settled the Showtime Networks distribution dispute in January 1995, preceding the former's $2.3-billion sale of its Viacom Cablevision systems to TCI affiliate company Intermedia Partners.

In August 1997, TMC underwent an extensive rebranding effort that resulted in the channel briefly premiering its own original movies (which were produced through Showtime's original programming division), along with increasing reliance on action and comedy films that Showtime had started to deemphasize as part of its shift toward more "high-minded" original made-for-cable films and series. The channel also added daily movie marathons, aired without a set schedule and with the number of titles varying day-to-day, that were set around a specific theme; a companion weekend-long programming stunt scheduled once a month, the Double Vision Weekend, built on the daily marathon format, comprising multiple themed mini-marathons scheduled over all three days of the event. Building on the slogan it adopted with the rebrand ("100% Pure Movies, 100% Pure Fun"), the 1994 Crystal Waters single "100% Pure Love" was sampled for use in network IDs and prime time schedule previews as well as a nightclub-themed "dream sequence" image promo (which quoted an April 1997 Wall Street Journal television review referring to its then-recent programming changes as having "transform[ed it] into the party girl of the Viacom family.") In addition, TMC also started running movie and celebrity trivia segments during promotional breaks (originally known as TMC Fun Facts and later TMC Reel Stuff), along with incorporating trivia during promos for movies that were scheduled to air on the channel (the channel had previously aired trivia segments between 1988 and 1991). In October of that year, The Movie Channel launched a secondary service, The Movie Channel 2 (renamed The Movie Channel Xtra in March 2001), which is the only multiplex channel to be launched by the service.

In March 2001, The Movie Channel began premiering movies that did not previously receive a theatrical, home video or DVD release, under the umbrella brand "TMC First-Run Movies". It also began airing softcore pornographic films during late night time periods. The channel also debuted a series of two-minute sketches called The Pitch, starring character actor Sean Smith as a movie executive who listens as prospective playwrights pitch him ideas for films (the segment was tongue-in-cheek in nature as the pitches were for well-known existing feature films such as Cliffhanger and The Terminator).

=== Under CBS Corporation ownership (2005–2019) ===
On June 14, 2005, only five years after the company completed its $2.4-billion acquisition of the original CBS Corporation, Viacom announced that it would split its holdings into two separate media companies, citing concerns by management over stagnation of the principal company's stock price; both companies would be controlled by National Amusements, the Sumner Redstone-owned media and real estate holding company that had owned Viacom since 1976. When the split was completed on December 31, 2005, the original Viacom was restructured as the second CBS Corporation, which retained ownership of Showtime Networks; CBS' broadcast television and radio assets (including the CBS television network, UPN (which was replaced by The CW in September 2006) and the company's broadcast group, which became CBS Television Stations); Paramount Television (now the separate arms CBS Studios for network and pay-TV production, and CBS Media Ventures for production of first-run syndicated programs and off-network series distribution); advertising firm Viacom Outdoor (renamed CBS Outdoor); publishing firm Simon & Schuster; and amusement park operator Paramount Parks (which was later sold to Cedar Fair, L.P. on June 30, 2006). The newly incorporated spin-off company, which assumed the Viacom name, attained ownership of Paramount Pictures, the MTV Networks and BET Networks pay-TV divisions, and Famous Music (the latter of which was sold to Sony-ATV Music Publishing in May 2007).

On May 3, 2006, The Movie Channel adopted an overhauled on-air look including a new logo and slogan (Movies For Movie Lovers). Bumpers that introduced films were discontinued entirely (instead starting the film with the customary intermediate bumper providing rating and content information). The channel's website – which only featured a programming schedule with up to one month of data in advance – was also revamped with the addition of special features including an online store, a streaming video player and previews of films set to air on the channel (TMC still features movie trivia interstitials between films on the linear channels and on its video-on-demand service, though it directs viewers to the channel's website for answers to the trivia questions).

=== Re-merger with Viacom, Paramount Global, Paramount Skydance and Skydance (from 2019) ===
On August 13, 2019, it was officially announced that CBS and Viacom would merge into a new entity known as ViacomCBS. Viacom CEO Bob Bakish would serve as president and CEO of the new company, while Ianniello would become chairman and CEO of CBS and oversee CBS-branded assets. Shari Redstone will also serve as chairwoman of ViacomCBS. On October 29, 2019, National Amusements approved the re-merger deal. It closed on December 4, 2019. As part of the new structure, Showtime, The Movie Channel and Flix became part of the Premium Content Group division of ViacomCBS Domestic Media Networks, along with BET and Pop TV, to be overseen by SNI CEO David Nevins.

On February 16, 2022, ViacomCBS renamed itself to Paramount Global; the company's American cable networks unit became Paramount Media Networks on the same day.

In 2023, National Amusements, the controlling shareholder of Paramount Global, began exploring potential transactions involving the media conglomerate amid financial difficulties and increasing competition in the entertainment industry. Several companies expressed interest in acquiring or partnering with Paramount, including Skydance Media, Sony Pictures, Apollo Global Management and Warner Bros. Discovery.

Negotiations between Paramount and Skydance initially collapsed in June 2024, but resumed the following month. On July 7, 2024, the companies announced a definitive agreement for a transaction involving the acquisition of National Amusements and the combination of Paramount Global and Skydance Media. The agreement included an investment of more than $8 billion from the Ellison family and RedBird Capital Partners. David Ellison, founder and chief executive of Skydance Media, was designated to lead the combined company, with Jeff Shell as president.

The transaction underwent regulatory review throughout 2025. The Federal Communications Commission approved the merger on July 24, 2025, clearing a major remaining regulatory hurdle. The combination was completed on August 7, 2025, establishing Paramount Skydance Corporation, with Paramount Global and Skydance Media becoming its subsidiaries.

Soon after formation of Paramount Skydance, this company continued pursuing an acquisition of Warner Bros Discovery, submitting revised offers for the entire company. On February 26, 2026, Warner Bros Discovery board determined that Paramount's latest proposal of $31 per share in cash constituted a superior proposal to its existing Netflix agreement. Netflix declined to increase its offer and withdrew from the bidding process. On February 27, Paramount Skydance and Warner Bros Discovery announced a definitive agreement under which Paramount would acquire Warner Bros Discovery for approximately $81 billion in equity value and $110 billion in enterprise value.

Warner Bros Discovery shareholders approved the transaction on April 23, 2026. The proposed acquisition subsequently faced antitrust litigation from a coalition of twelve U.S. states and the Writers Guild of America. In September, Paramount and Warner Bros Discovery reached settlements resolving these challenges. The states' settlement included commitments concerning theatrical film output, increased domestic production investment, television distribution practices and editorial independence safeguards for CBS News and CNN. A federal court approved the states' consent decree on September 30, allowing the transaction to proceed.

This aquisition also reunited several networks—such as The Movie Channel, MTV, Nickelodeon, VH1, and Comedy Central—with other Warner companies after more than 40 years.

== Channels ==
=== List of channels ===
Depending on the service provider, The Movie Channel provides up to four multiplex channels – two 24-hour multiplex channels, both of which are simulcast in both standard definition and high definition – as well as a subscription video-on-demand service (The Movie Channel On Demand). The Movie Channel and multiplex service The Movie Channel Xtra respectively broadcast on both Eastern and Pacific Time Zone schedules. The individual coastal feeds of each channel are usually packaged together, resulting in the difference in local airtimes for a particular movie telecast between two geographic locations being three hours at most. Most subscription providers, however, only offer the east and west coast feeds of TMC's main channel and one coastal feed of TMC Xtra applicable to a particular region (the Eastern Time Zone feed in areas from the Central Time Zone eastward or the Pacific feed in areas from the Mountain Time Zone westward); some providers only offer the coastal feeds of the primary channel and TMC Xtra applicable to their region.

Showtime and Flix, which are also owned by ViacomCBS, operate as separate services. Although The Movie Channel is frequently sold together in a package with Showtime, TMC subscribers do not necessarily have to subscribe to the other two services. Prior to the advent of digital cable, many providers often sold The Movie Channel separately from Showtime, continuing for about two decades after Viacom acquired both Warner Communications and Warner-Amex Satellite Entertainment's respective ownership interests of the two previously autonomous services in 1985. Showtime began offering all of its channels, including TMC, Flix and Sundance Channel (now AMC Networks-owned SundanceTV), in a single package by the early 2000s; this resulted in most providers (with the exception of Comcast, DirecTV and Dish Network) ceasing to sell or promote The Movie Channel separately from Showtime (Dish Network and DirecTV offer both TMC and TMC Xtra optionally as either a package with the remainder of the Showtime multiplex, or as part of a separate movie tier to subscribers that do not already have Showtime; both The Movie Channel and Starz Encore are the only American premium channels to be offered to subscribers that do not subscribe to their co-owned premium services).

Although one or both of the channels have traditionally been carried alongside the Showtime multiplex channels on traditional pay television providers, as of 2024, The Movie Channel as well as Flix are not presently carried as live feeds on Paramount+'s premium tier (nor was it ever available on Showtime's defunct direct-to-consumer service and TV Everywhere platform Showtime Anytime, all of which only offer the Eastern and Pacific feeds of the main Showtime channel); the Paramount+ add-ons (and the predecessor Showtime aggregated OTT add-ons) sold through Apple TV Channels, Amazon Video Channels, The Roku Channel and YouTube Primetime Channels; or the Showtime add-ons sold through over-the-top subscription television services (including Hulu Live TV, Sling TV, DirecTV Stream, YouTube TV and Philo).

Channel	Description and programming
The Movie Channel	The Movie Channel is the main "flagship" feed; it carries blockbuster and smaller first-run feature films, independent films and late-night erotica. TMC broadcasts a featured movie around 8:00 pm. Eastern and Pacific Time each night and has one regularly scheduled movie block: the weekly horror movie double feature "Splatterday on Saturday" on Saturday evenings at 10:00 pm. Eastern and Pacific.
The Movie Channel Xtra	The Movie Channel Xtra is a secondary channel providing more movie choice for viewers, which is counterprogrammed to The Movie Channel with a largely separate schedule (outside of some common titles shared between the two channels during each month, which are shown in different time slots). TMC Xtra features a nightly feature movie around 9:00 pm. Eastern and Pacific Time, and rebroadcasts the previous week's edition of the "Splatterday" block as aired on the main TMC channel on Friday nights at 10:00 pm. Eastern and Pacific. The channel first launched on October 1, 1997, as The Movie Channel 2, and was renamed as The Movie Channel Xtra on March 5, 2001.

=== Related services ===
==== The Movie Channel HD ====
The Movie Channel HD is a high definition simulcast feed of The Movie Channel that broadcasts in the 1080i resolution format, and was launched on December 1, 2003. Most American subscription providers carry this simulcast.

==== The Movie Channel On Demand ====
The Movie Channel operates a subscription video-on-demand television service, The Movie Channel on Demand, which is available at no additional charge to new and existing subscribers of TMC. The service launched on December 1, 2003, with a subscriber base of two million homes. The Movie Channel On Demand offers program content available in standard or high definition categorized by four individual genres: action and adventure films, dramas, comedies and softcore pornographic films. It also offers special feature content consisting of film trivia and behind-the-scenes features including interviews. The Movie Channel on Demand's rotating program selection incorporates select new titles that are added each Friday, alongside existing program titles held over from the previous one to two weeks.

== Programming ==
=== Movie library ===
As of April 2023, The Movie Channel – through Showtime – maintains exclusive first-run film licensing agreements with Amblin Partners (including releases produced in conjunction with DreamWorks Pictures and Participant), IFC Films, A24, and Bleecker Street.

The Movie Channel also shows sub-runs – runs of films that have already received broadcast or syndicated television airings – of theatrical films distributed by Sony Pictures (including content from Columbia Pictures, TriStar Pictures, Screen Gems, Revolution Studios and Morgan Creek Productions), Warner Bros. Pictures (including content from New Line Cinema), Universal Pictures (including content from subsidiary Focus Features), Open Road Films, Screen Media, Oscilloscope, Summit Entertainment (for films released prior to 2013), Paramount Pictures (for films released prior to 2017), Amazon MGM Studios (including content from subsidiaries United Artists and Orion Pictures), Lionsgate (sub-run rights with the latter two studios are for films released prior to 2009), and Walt Disney Studios Motion Pictures (including content from Pixar, Walt Disney Animation Studios, Walt Disney Pictures, 20th Century Studios, Touchstone Pictures, Hollywood Pictures, and Marvel Studios). Miramax (including content Dimension Films (pre-2005) (a former subsidiary of Miramax#Disney_era_(1993–2010)).

Many lesser-known film titles (particularly those released as independent films) that have either not received a theatrical release or were released on DVD or home video are also commonly broadcast on TMC. The window between a film's initial release in theaters and its initial screening on Showtime, The Movie Channel and Flix is wider than the grace period leading to a film's initial broadcast on HBO, Cinemax or Starz. Films to which Showtime holds the pay-TV rights will usually also run on The Movie Channel and sister channel Flix during the period of its term of licensing.

=== Programming blocks ===
==== Current ====
- Splatterday: In May 2006, The Movie Channel introduced a weekly block called Splatterday on Saturday (also known as simply "Splatterday"). The block – which airs on the main channel each Saturday night starting at 9:00 p.m. Eastern and Pacific Time, with an encore presentation of the entire block airing the following Friday evening at 10:00 p.m. Eastern and Pacific on The Movie Channel Xtra – is a double feature of horror movies; the two films that air in that week's initial late evening block are rebroadcast on TMC's primary channel following the conclusion of the second film. From the block's debut until late 2008, the "Splatterday" lineup also included repeats of the now-defunct Showtime anthology series Masters of Horror, which is the only television series to have aired on The Movie Channel to date.
- The Good Stuff: The Movie Channel introduced a weeknight block called "The Good Stuff" in May 2006, showcasing critically acclaimed theatrical and independent films as part of its late night schedule, usually airing around 12:00 a.m. Eastern and Pacific Time.

==== Former ====
- Midnight Madness: Running from 1983 to 1988, the block originated as "The Saturday Special", a showcase of comedy and musical films that originally aired on Saturday late nights at 12:00 a.m. Eastern Time. The block, maintaining the same format and time slot, was renamed "Friday Movie Madness" upon its move to Fridays in May 1984, before being renamed "Midnight Madness" in September 1985.
- Joe Bob's Drive-In Theater: Originally debuting in January 1984 as The Movie Channel's Drive-In Theater and airing on Fridays in late prime time, the weekly double feature showcase presented a mix of cult films, B movies and some exploitation films. In January 1986, the program was moved to Saturday nights with the appointment of a regular host, Joe Bob Briggs (the alter ego of actor and film critic John Bloom, who was asked by TMC management to portray his Texan redneck character – standardly donning cowboy attire and a ten-gallon hat – for a guest hosting role on the program, after gaining notice through his one-man comedic stage show An Evening with Joe Bob Briggs, later retitled Joe Bob Dead in Concert). Each of the features presented on the retitled Joe Bob's Drive-In Theater were bookended by taped wraparound segments that featured Bloom building upon the persona he cultivated in his syndicated newspaper column and stage show, and incorporated many recurring gags from Briggs' unique way of introducing movies (featuring a summary of the amount of violence and nudity included in the films being showcased [i.e. "three dead bodies, six naked breasts..."], with nouns suffixed with "-fu" often being used to refer to objects featured in fight scenes) to colorful tales that often dealt with romantic troubles and brushes with the law that involved him rushing to see a film at a local drive-in. He also read letters from viewers on the air, who often requested specific movies to be aired, some of which were ultimately chosen to be featured on the broadcast. As Briggs, Bloom also closed each edition with the signoff, "this is Joe Bob Briggs, reminding you that the drive-in will never die". Bloom's work as the Joe Bob character also extended to roles as host of The Movie Channel's Midnight Madness block during the second half of the 1980s, and for an extension of the "Drive-In Theater", the "All-Night Drive-In", which aired on Fridays from May 1988 to May 1991 as part of the "VCR Overnight" block. After Joe Bob's Drive-In Theater ended its ten-year run on TMC on February 24, 1996, Bloom would reprise the Joe Bob Briggs character as host of TNT's horror film block MonsterVision from 1997 to 2000.
- Salute to the Academy Awards: The Movie Channel aired the "Salute to the Academy Awards" (a month-long block similar to the present-day 31 Days of Oscar annual lineup on Turner Classic Movies) from 1984 to 1997, which ran during the month proceeding the Academy Awards. It featured movies that have won or earned nominations for Academy Awards in various film and acting categories, with one Oscar-winning or Oscar-nominated film airing each evening.
- Tuesday Film Festival: Running from 1985 to 1987, the "Tuesday Film Festival" block was a prime time showcase of critically acclaimed feature films that aired on Tuesday evenings at 8:00 p.m. Eastern and Pacific Time.
- VCR Theater/VCR Overnite/TMC Overnight: The channel launched a weekly feature called "The Movie Channel's VCR Theater" in June 1986, which originally aired nightly at 3:00 a.m. Eastern and Pacific Time. The block was created in response to the rise in consumer ownership of VCRs (particularly among the channel's subscriber base) during the 1980s. The films featured were selected for the convenience of subscribers wanting to videotape a movie of particular interest while they are asleep to watch at a later time of their choosing (the overnight time slot was chosen because of the technical limitations with VCRs that prevented cable and satellite subscribers from watching one program and recording another simultaneously in the pre-digital video recorder era). The block was renamed "VCR Overnite" in 1988, at which point, it expanded to include three extended blocks: the "All-Night Drive-In" (a spin-off of "Joe Bob's Drive-In Theater") on Fridays, the "Movie Marathon" on Saturdays and "TMC Classics" on Sundays; these full-overnight weekend blocks were discontinued in 1991. The block was reduced to a weekly airing on early Wednesday mornings in 1997 as "TMC Overnight"; this iteration of the block lasted until 2004.
- TMC Top Attraction: This block, which ran from May 1988 to May 1991, was based around a featured movie title making its TMC debut that was initially showcased each Friday night at 11:00 p.m. Eastern Time. The "Top Attraction" also included encore presentations of that week's premiere film that progressively aired two hours earlier from the prior prime time telecast on Saturday (at 9:00 p.m. Eastern Time) and Sunday evenings (at 7:00 p.m. Eastern Time).
- The Movie Channel's Weekend [at the] Multiplex: Running from May 1988 to May 1991, the "Weekend Multiplex" was a weekend-long umbrella block that was primarily centered around several distinct themed film blocks during prime time on Friday through Sundays starting at 7:00 p.m. Eastern and Pacific Time. Joined alongside the Top Attraction and Joe Bob's Drive-In Theater as part of the lineup were the "TGIF Movie" (a Friday early evening showcase featuring lighter film fare), "Friday Night Action" (a weekly showcase of action films), "The Early Show" (featuring a different feature film on Saturday early evenings), the "Sunday Star Movie" (a prime time feature movie) and "Critics' Choice" (a Sunday late-evening showcase of critically acclaimed feature films). The lineup also encompassed a daytime lineup with films scheduled at less fixed airtimes – in contrast to the scheduling format adopted at the time of the May 1988 rebrand for its weekday daytime and daily nighttime programming – akin to the scheduling used by movie theaters and full late-night themed editions of "VCR Overnite".
- The Movie Channel Challenge: Running each August from 1990 to 1997, "The Movie Channel Challenge" was a month-long summer programming stunt – inspired by the "no-repeat weekends" music playlist stunts used on many radio stations – that featured a lineup of approximately 420 movies, none of which were repeated during the course of that month. The festival was developed to address a consumer complaint common with premium services like The Movie Channel, in avoiding repeat showings of select films on multiple dates and time slots during the calendar month – effectively quadrupling the number of movies that most pay services typically aired in a given month (TMC's film lineup normally averages around 100 movies per month) – and to attract potential subscribers to and increase consumer awareness of TMC (at the time the festival began, The Movie Channel had approximately 2.5 million subscribers, one-third that of sister network Showtime, which had 8.5 million). Individual marathon-style festivals consisting of a set of movies starring a particular actor or focusing on a certain film genre (similar to those later featured as part of the "TMC Marathons/Double Vision Weekends" blocks) would be aired at various points during the period.
- Tuesday Night Terrors: In May 1991, The Movie Channel introduced Tuesday Night Terrors, a weekly block of horror films (similar in format to the present-day Splatterday on Saturday block) that aired on Tuesday nights at 10:00 p.m. Eastern and Pacific Time; the block was discontinued in August 1997.
- The Movie Channel Marathons: In February 1996, TMC started airing movie marathons seven days a week, featuring three, or sometimes four, films that were tied to a specific subject (such as "Ouch" for crime dramas, or "The Eyes Have It" for films with the word "eyes" in their title such as Night Eyes 3) or actor (such as "Omar Goodness" for movies starring Omar Epps). These themed marathons were discontinued on March 2, 2006.
- TMC Double Vision Weekends: In conjunction with the daily marathons, The Movie Channel ran a special extended marathon-style lineup, the "Double Vision Weekend", on a bi-monthly basis beginning in August 1997. These three-day long blocks featured three different movies starring a particular actor or actress within various mini-marathon block, with a new themed set of films airing after the conclusion of the previous block. The "Double Vision Weekend" lineup ran throughout the daytime and evening hours each day during the Friday through Sunday period in which it was scheduled, typically encompassing a larger portion of the schedule than that of the channel's standard "TMC Marathons" blocks (the daily marathon lineups ran during the afternoon and/or evening hours). The "Double Vision Weekend" blocks were discontinued in May 2006, along with the daily film marathons.

===== Showtime After Hours =====
A signature feature of Showtime was a late-night block known as Showtime After Hours, which featured softcore pornographic films and original series. Showtime did not have set start or end times for the block, as they varied depending on the mainstream feature films – and original series on certain nights – that aired prior to and following it, and also depended on the number of programs and programs in particular that were scheduled to air within the block. Programs that aired under the Showtime After Hours banner carried either a TV-MA or R rating (usually the former), primarily for strong sexual content and nudity. The block had often been the subject of both scrutiny in the media and a source of humor in popular culture, with references to Showtime's late night programming being featured in various films and television shows.

== Branding ==
Over the years, TMC has used a myriad of unique, and sometimes bizarre logos and promotional concepts. The channel's original logo under the "Movie Channel" name incorporated a star outline made up of film strips with folded sides, indirectly referencing its previous identity as Star Channel. In 1981, the text for the network's name changed from the Broadway typeface to a stylized all-uppercase font (with a slightly enlarged letter "M") augmented to the left and underside of the star. Beginning in 1983, the network alternately used a script logo (which varied slightly in style, depending on the promo or network ID it was displayed in), sometimes more often than its "star" logo. Promos using the "script" logo were aired on the network up until the 1988 rebrand, although they were used less frequently from the summer of 1985 as the "star" logo was phased back to universal use within TMC's on-air imaging. Between 1985 and 1988, TMC began airing somewhat clever graphics for their time such as a "tour of Hollywood" introduction for its film presentations, which closed with a shot of the Hollywood skyline with a faint heart outline in the middle of the sky.

On May 1, 1988, The Movie Channel debuted its "eye and profile" logo, which used various designs incorporating facial expressions, with the channel's name rendered in Helvetica Extended on tilted black bars at the top and bottom of the logo; some viewers have commented on online blogs and video websites such as YouTube that this logo, due to the eyes being prominently displayed, had frightened them as young children (this logo was replicated somewhat when WGN America used a logo featuring a set of female eyes rimmed with green mascara from 2008 to 2009). The channel ran different and unique feature presentation opens and network IDs during the nine-year period it was in use (among which included intros in which the logo changed facial expressions at the draw of a curtain, set to a bouncy keyboard tune; a grayscale version of the logo – which then winked – rotating to face the screen in front of a gray background accompanied by a steady drumbeat; and a live-action/partially computer-animated sequence set to Indiana Jones-style adventure music in which the logo shoots lasers from its eyes to escape from the newspaper it is printed on – which is set afire as kindling in a fireplace – and embarks on a calamity-filled journey through a family's living room, seen from its point of view, as it heads toward the safety of a TV set it rappels into on a cable hooked up to a wall outlet above the fireplace's mantle).

Alternate version of current logo.

TMC adopted a very slick on-air look that predominantly used CGI graphics, with the debut of a new logo in August 1997, a 3D computer-animated green sphere with a tilted and lowercase "tmc" imprinted on it, usually shown either to the right of the channel's full name or above the name (also rendered in lowercase type). Jeff Bottoms (who has since become The Movie Channel's longest-serving promo announcer, and also does promotions for sister channel Showtime) promoted upcoming programs between films with humorous and tongue-in-cheek voiceovers. During the late 1990s and early 2000s, The Movie Channel started running a wide variety of network promotions from those akin to a movie trailer to typical promos that feature behind-the-scenes trivia relating to the film. The latter technique continued to be used by the channel – often in a more hybrid way – until the fall of 2015, when the Showtime Networks services began deemphasizing the use of voiceovers in on-air promotions, at which point film promotions shown during breaks switched to using trailers accompanied by the channel's standard title/timeslot card.

An extensively modified logo was introduced on March 5, 2001, featuring a one-dimensional circle with a lowercase "tmc" in Knockout type on it, surrounded with two lines on the corners framing the circle; the "movie" in the channel's name was rendered in bold. The Movie Channel's current logo was introduced on May 3, 2006, featuring three colored crescent-like sections in a circle framing the channel's name, rendered in the same Helvetica typeface variant used in the 1988–1997 logo. Online film reviewers were incorporated into promos for films to provide backstory on the movie at this point. On April 1, 2010, The Movie Channel and TMC Xtra began displaying digital on-screen graphic logos of the respective channels during its programming; the bug seen is an alternate version of the channel's logo with "The Movie Channel" name oriented in vertically stacked text.

=== Network slogans ===
- 1979–1983: "All Movies, 24 Hours a Day" (alternately "All Movies, Only Movies, 24 Hours a Day"; used as an alternate slogan from 1983 to 1988)
- 1980–1982: "We're Taking the Movies to America"
- 1981–1983: "You've Got The Movie Channel, The Movies You Want to See, 24 Hours a Day"
- 1982–1983: "We Do Movies Better Because Movies Are All We Do"
- 1983–1984: "Anytime You Gotta Have A Movie" (commercial slogan)
- 1984–1988: "The Heart of Hollywood"
- 1988–1990: "A Whole Channel Devoted to Movies"
- 1990–1993: "A Movie Anytime You Want One"
- 1993–1997: "You're Never More Than Five Minutes Away from a Movie [on The Movie Channel]"
- 1997–2001: "100% Pure Movies, 100% Pure Fun"
- 2001–2006: "The Stuff Movies Are Made of"
- 2006–present: "Movies for Movie Lovers"
- 2014: "Nobody has it Better than on The Movie Channel" (secondary slogan)
