= 1973 Emmy Awards =

1973 Emmy Awards may refer to:

- 25th Primetime Emmy Awards, the 1973 Emmy Awards ceremony honoring primetime programming
- 1st International Emmy Awards, the 1973 Emmy Awards ceremony honoring international programming

Preceded by 1972 (Primetime)	Emmy Awards; 1973	Succeeded by 1974
