= 1975 Emmy Awards =

1975 Emmy Awards may refer to:

- 27th Primetime Emmy Awards, the 1975 Emmy Awards ceremony honoring primetime programming
- 2nd Daytime Emmy Awards, the 1975 Emmy Awards ceremony honoring daytime programming
- 3rd International Emmy Awards, the 1975 Emmy Awards ceremony honoring international programming

Preceded by 1974	Emmy Awards; 1975	Succeeded by 1976
