= 1976 Emmy Awards =

1976 Emmy Awards may refer to:

- 28th Primetime Emmy Awards, the 1976 Emmy Awards ceremony honoring primetime programming
- 3rd Daytime Emmy Awards, the 1976 Emmy Awards ceremony honoring daytime programming
- 4th International Emmy Awards, the 1976 Emmy Awards ceremony honoring international programming

| Preceded by 1975 | Emmy Awards; 1976 | Succeeded by 1977 |
