= Showtime (TV network) =

American pay television network

- Primary logo from 1997-2024; still used for certain marketing and channel branding contexts
- Type: Pay television network
- Country: United States
- Broadcast area: Nationwide
- Headquarters: New York City, U.S.

Programming
- Languages: English; Spanish (as SAP option; select films may be subtitled in English from their native language)
- Picture format: 480i (SDTV); 1080i (HDTV)
- Timeshift service: Paramount+ with Showtime/Showtime timeshift channels: Paramount+ with Showtime (East / West); Showtime 2 (East / West); Showcase (East / West); SHO×BET (East / West); Showtime Extreme (East / West); Showtime Family Zone (East / West); Showtime Next (East / West); Showtime Women (East / West)

Ownership
- Owner: Skydance
- Parent: Skydance Direct-to-Consumer

History
- Launched: July 1, 1976; 50 years ago

Links
- Website: www.paramountplus.com/brands/showtime/

Availability

Streaming media
- Paramount+: paramountplus.com: (American internet subscribers only; requires subscription or television provider login to access main network)

Showtime (officially known as Paramount+ with Showtime (Note: Showtime was the former name of the main channel from 1976 to 2024, but is still used for certain marketing and channel branding contexts.) since 2025) is an American premium television network and the flagship property of Showtime Networks, a subdivision of the Skydance Direct-to-Consumer division of Skydance. Launched on July 1, 1976, Showtime's programming includes original television series produced exclusively for the linear network and developed for the co-owned Paramount+ streaming service, theatrically released and independent motion pictures, documentaries, and occasional stand-up comedy specials, made-for-TV movies, and softcore adult programming.

Headquartered at Paramount Plaza in the northern part of New York City's Broadway district, Showtime operates eight 24-hour, linear multiplex channels and formerly a standalone traditional subscription video on demand service; the channel's programming catalog and livestreams of its primary linear East and West Coast feeds are also available via an ad-free subscription tier of Paramount+ of the same name, which is also sold a la carte through Apple TV Channels, Prime Video Channels, The Roku Channel, and YouTube Primetime Channels. (Subscribers of Paramount+'s Prime Video add-on also receive access to the East Coast feeds of Showtime's seven multiplex channels.) It is a sister premium television network to HBO, Cinemax, The Movie Channel and Flix.

In addition, the Showtime brand has been licensed for use by a number of channels and platforms worldwide including Showtime Arabia (it has been merged into OSN) in the Middle East and North Africa, and the now defunct Showtime Movie Channels in Australia. As of September 2018, Showtime's programming was available to approximately 28.567 million American households which subscribed to a multichannel television provider (28.318 million of which receive Showtime's primary channel at a minimum).

== History ==
=== Early years (1976–1982) ===
Showtime was launched on July 1, 1976, on Times-Mirror Cable systems in Escondido, Long Beach, and Palos Verdes, California, through the conversion of 10,000 subscribers of the previous Channel One franchise. Exactly a week later Showtime launched on Viacom Cablevision's system in Dublin, California; the channel was originally owned by Viacom. The first program to be broadcast on Showtime was Celebration, a concert special featuring performances by Rod Stewart, Pink Floyd, and ABBA. By the end of its first year on the air, Showtime had 55,000 subscribers nationwide. On March 7, 1978, Showtime became a nationally distributed service when it was uplinked to satellite, becoming a competitor with Time Inc.'s HBO and other pay cable networks.

In 1979, Viacom sold 50% of Showtime to the TelePrompTer Corporation. On July 4, 1981, Showtime began a 24-hour programming schedule (rival HBO followed suit in December of the same year). In 1982, Group W Cable, a subsidiary of Westinghouse Electric Corporation (which acquired TelePrompTer the previous year), sold its 50% stake in Showtime back to Viacom for $75 million. The sale of Group W's stake in the channel happened shortly after the company began a partnership with Walt Disney Productions (now The Walt Disney Company) to develop a competing premium service, The Disney Channel. Group W left the joint venture in September, due to disagreements over creative control and financial obligations. In 1982 Showtime broadcast its first made-for-cable movie Falcon's Gold and its first original series and children's program Faerie Tale Theatre.

=== Formation of Showtime Networks and ownership by Viacom (1982–2005) ===
In August 1982, MCA Inc. (then the owner of Universal Pictures), Gulf+Western (then the owner of Paramount Pictures) and Warner Communications agreed to acquire The Movie Channel (TMC). The three companies combined acquired a controlling 75% interest in the service (with each holding a 25% ownership stake) from Warner-Amex Satellite Entertainment. The deal was spurred by the studios wanting to increase their share of revenue for licensing rights to their films to premium television services, as well as concerns that HBO's dominance of that market and its pre-buying of pay cable rights to films prior to their theatrical release would result in that service holding undue negotiating power for the television rights, resulting in a lower than suitable licensing fee rate the studios would be paid for individual films. The three companies announced an agreement in to acquire interests in TMC on November 11, 1982. In late December of the same year, the U.S. Department of Justice launched a routine preliminary inquiry into the proposed partnership. The Department of Justice had blocked a similar attempt by MCA, Gulf+Western, 20th Century Fox, and Columbia Pictures to create a competing pay service, Premiere, in an antitrust case ruling two years earlier in January 1981.

On January 7, 1983, Viacom International (adding itself as a partner) drafted an amendment to the proposal to consolidate The Movie Channel with Showtime. Under the revised proposal, the four studios would each own a 22.58% stake in the two networks, with American Express owning a 9.68% minority interest. In addition, the consortium would appoint a management team separate from those employed by the two channels–which continued to operate as separate services–to operate the joint venture. However the deal ran into regulatory hurdles because Warner, Universal, and Paramount received 50% of their respective total revenue from film releases and licensing fees from premium services. Also Showtime and TMC combined would control about 30% of the pay cable marketplace, creating an oligopoly with HBO (which in conjunction with Cinemax controlled 60% of the market).

After a four-month investigation resulted in the Department of Justice filing a civil antitrust lawsuit against the five parties to block the Showtime-TMC merger on June 10, 1983, the Department asked Warner and American Express to restructure the deal during hearings for the case. The Department's decision–citing concerns, including some expressed by HBO management, that combining the assets of Showtime and TMC would stifle competition in the sale of their programming and that of other pay cable services to cable providers–was despite the fact that under the original proposal, MCA, Gulf+Western and Warner had each agreed to continue licensing films released by their respective movie studios to competing pay television networks.

The partners involved in the merger would also set standard prices for films that were acquired for broadcast on The Movie Channel and Showtime, either those produced by the studio partners or by unassociated film studios. To address the Justice Department's concerns over the deal, the four partners submitted a revised proposal for consideration on July 19 which included guarantees of conduct agreeing that Paramount, Universal, and Warner Bros. would not receive higher residual licensing payments for films acquired by Showtime and The Movie Channel than those paid by other studios, and that all four partners would not permit the two channels in the venture to pay lower fees for films produced by three studio partners than those paid by smaller pay television services for the same films.

After the revised proposal was rejected on July 28, Warner Communications and American Express restructured the purchase to include only Viacom as a partner, bowing Gulf+Western and MCA out from the partnership. The changes – which Justice Department officials acknowledged would "prevent any anti-competitive effect from arising" following the merger, by allowing other premium services to enter the market should the venture significantly raise licensing fee prices for films–led the Justice Department to drop its challenge to the merger agreement on August 12; the department formally approved the deal the following day on August 13. When the deal was completed on September 6, 1983, the operations of The Movie Channel and Showtime were folded into a new holding company, Showtime/The Movie Channel, Inc., which was majority owned by Viacom (controlling 50% of the venture's common stock as well as investing $40 million in cash), with Warner Communications (which owned 31%), and Warner-Amex (which owned the remaining 19% interest) as minority partners.

As the consolidation of its operations with The Movie Channel was ongoing, in 1983, Showtime increased its national distribution on cable providers when competing premium service Spotlight ceased operations, effectively absorbing that channel's subscriber base.

In 1984, the network's first major promotional campaign, "We Make Excitement" (also referred to, particularly in bumpers and program introductions, as "Showtime Excitement") was created by the J. Walter Thompson company and utilizing an adapted version of the Pointer Sisters song "I'm So Excited". The campaign lasted into 1986 and coincided with both the exclusivity deal signed with Paramount for films (see below) and a graphical upgrade to the network's presentation to include computer-generated graphics.

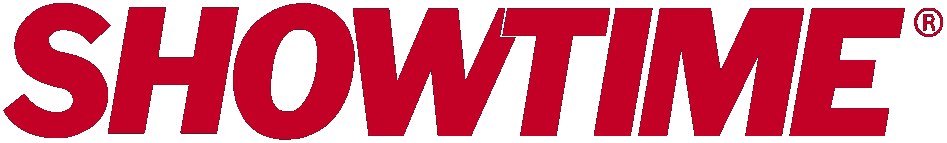
Showtime logo, used from 1981 to 1997; a 3D circle containing a TV screen (which was originally used as the channel's primary logo dating back to 1979) was used alongside this logo from 1984 to 1990. The logo was also used on Showtime Australia until 2009. It was also in use for nostalgia purposes for the marketing of the 2019 series Black Monday.

On August 10, 1985, after Time Inc. and cable provider Tele-Communications Inc. (TCI) jointly submitted a bid to buy the company for $900 million and the assumption of $500 million in debt as well as an earlier offer by American Express the previous month to buy out Warner's share of the company (under a clause in the agreement that allowed either company the option of buying out their partner's stake in Warner-Amex), Warner Communications exercised an option to acquire American Express' 50% share of Warner-Amex Cable Communications for $450 million. Among the options, barring that it chose to sell Viacom a 50% interest in the company for $450 million, the deal originally excluded Warner-Amex's 19% interest in Showtime-The Movie Channel, Inc.; that interest would have reverted to Warner, which intended to operate Warner-Amex as a wholly owned subsidiary.

Two weeks later on August 26, Viacom acquired Warner Communications and Warner-Amex's combined 50% ownership interest in Showtime/The Movie Channel, Inc. as well as full ownership of the Warner-Amex and public shareholder interests in MTV Networks for $671.7 million, giving Viacom exclusive ownership of both networks and once again making it the sole owner of Showtime through its $500 million cash payment and acquisition of 1.625 million shares from Warner for Warner's 31% stake in Showtime/The Movie Channel and Warner-Amex's 19% interest in the unit and its 60% interest in MTV Networks (Viacom owned Showtime alone or jointly with other companies–TelePrompTer Corporation, and later briefly, its successor Group W Cable–from the time it launched in July 1976). The buyout, part of an option given by Warner in its purchase of American Express' interest in MTV, was exercised in part to finance much of the buyout of Showtime/The Movie Channel without borrowing any money (ironically, Warner Communications would eventually acquire rivals HBO and Cinemax, when the company merged with Time Inc. in 1990 to form Time Warner, which is now known as Warner Bros. Discovery). The subsidiary was renamed Showtime Networks, Inc. in 1988.

Also in 1988, the company formed Showtime Event Television (now Showtime PPV) as a pay-per-view distributor of special event programming. In 1990, Showtime ventured into acquiring and premiering independent films exclusively for the channel as part of the 30-Minute Movie short film anthology series. One of its first premieres, 12:01 PM, was nominated for an Academy Award; 1992's Session Man won an Academy Award for Best Live Action Short Film. During this period, promotional voice-over work for the network was performed by Bill St. James. In the years that followed, Showtime expanded its acquisitions into the realm of feature-length fare, including the Adrian Lyne-directed 1997 remake of Lolita.

On March 1, 1994, Showtime and The Movie Channel in conjunction with rivals HBO and Cinemax implemented a cooperative content advisory system to provide to parents specific information about pay-cable programming content that may be unsuitable for their children; the development of the system—inspired by the advisory ratings featured in program guides distributed by the major premium cable services—was in response to concerns from parents and advocacy groups about violent content on television, allowing Showtime Networks and other premium services discretionary authority to assign individual ratings corresponding to the objectionable content depicted in specific programs (and categorized based on violence, profanity, sexuality or miscellaneous mature material). A revised system—centered around ten content codes of two to three letters in length—was implemented by Showtime and the other participating premium services on June 10, 1994.

In 1997, the channel's first major rebrand since the 1980s was introduced, with a new logo emphasizing the "SHO" part of the network's name within a circle (intended to be a spotlight), playing into the channel's common acronym in listings services such as TV Guide. A new slogan, "No Limits" (in reference to the fact that as a premium channel, Showtime could push the boundaries of programming without censorship, as well as offer the type of exciting programming that appealed to subscribers), and a bold red-and-black color scheme was instituted, with promotions and bumpers feature surrealistic imagery; the campaign was created by the newly formed in-house marketing and advertising agency, "Red Group".

In 2000, Showtime launched "Showtime Interactive 24.7", a service that provided DVD-style interaction of its entertainment offerings. The following year in 2001, Showtime became one of the first cable networks to launch a high-definition simulcast feed (with Star Trek: Insurrection becoming the first film on the network to be broadcast in HD); Showtime also began to provide Dolby Digital 5.1 surround sound on select programs.

=== Under CBS Corporation ownership (2005–2019) ===
Showtime logo when it was under CBS Corporation

On June 14, 2005, Viacom decided to separate itself into two companies (only five years after the company's acquisition of CBS), both of which would be controlled by Viacom parent National Amusements, amid stagnation of the company's stock price. When the split was completed on December 31, 2005, the original Viacom was restructured as CBS Corporation and kept Showtime Networks along with the original Viacom's broadcasting assets (which included the CBS television network, UPN and the company's broadcast group, which became CBS Television Stations), Paramount Television (now the separate arms CBS Studios for network and cable production, and CBS Media Ventures for production of first-run syndicated programs and off-network series distribution), advertising firm Viacom Outdoor (renamed CBS Outdoor), Simon & Schuster, and Paramount Parks (which was later sold to Cedar Fair, L.P. on June 30, 2006). A new company that assumed the Viacom name took Paramount Pictures, the MTV Networks and BET Networks cable divisions, and Famous Music (the latter of which was sold to Sony-ATV Music Publishing (CBS once owned its sister company) in May 2007).

=== Re-merger with Viacom; co-branding with Paramount+ (2019–present) ===
On August 13, 2019, the announcement was made that CBS and Viacom would merge into a new entity known as ViacomCBS (now known as Paramount Global). Viacom CEO Bob Bakish would be president and CEO of the new company, while Ianniello would become chairman and CEO of CBS and oversee CBS-branded assets. Shari Redstone would also serve as chairperson of ViacomCBS. On October 29, 2019, National Amusements approved the re-merger deal. It closed on December 4, 2019. As part of the new structure the Showtime Networks unit and its assets—Showtime, The Movie Channel and Flix—became part of the Premium Network Group division of ViacomCBS Domestic Media Networks, along with BET and temporarily Pop TV (which was transferred to the Youth & Entertainment Group division the following month, later named MTV Entertainment Group), to be overseen by SNI CEO David Nevins. ViacomCBS renamed itself as Paramount Global on February 16, 2022; the company's domestic networks division became Paramount Media Networks on the same day.

Paramount+ with Showtime logo, used since January 8, 2024.

On January 30, 2023, Paramount Global announced plans to fully integrate the Showtime direct-to-consumer service (which was sold directly to streaming-only consumers) with the premium tier of the Paramount+ streaming service; the combined service would be branded as Paramount+ with Showtime, replacing a streaming bundle of the same name that launched in August 2022. The merger commenced on June 27, 2023, with the cable-specific Showtime Anytime TV Everywhere app (which was offered to subscribers of the linear Showtime television service) ceasing operations on December 14, and the standalone Showtime app being discontinued on April 30, 2024; the primary Showtime channel was rebranded as Paramount+ with Showtime on January 8, 2024, although the former name remains in use as a standalone brand for its multiplex channels and for marketing of the network's original programs. On June 23, 2025, the premium tier of Paramount+ was renamed to Paramount+ Premium (which was its previous name from launch until the Showtime absorption), with the Essential plan introducing a sampling of Showtime-branded content. The Paramount+ with Showtime network remained unaffected by this rebrand.

== Channels ==
=== Background ===
In 1991, after HBO and sibling channel Cinemax debuted the first premium television multiplex service in the United States, Showtime followed with the testing of its own secondary service–Showtime 2–on October 1 of that year. In April 1994, Showtime announced the creation of a new themed multiplex service, consisting of five channels: Spanish-language service Showtime En Espanol; family-aimed Showtime Family Television; action-oriented service Showtime Action Television; a service featuring comedy films and series called Showtime Comedy Television; and a 24/7 film channel called Showtime Film Festival. This planned extension to the multiplex did not come to fruition–although a third multiplex service, Showtime 3, would make its debut in 1996.

The multiplex would eventually expand over time with the launch of the action-themed film channel Showtime Extreme on March 10, 1998, followed by the debut of the sci fi-themed channel Showtime Beyond in September 1999; the Showtime Unlimited name for the Showtime multiplex, TMC and Flix came into use around this time. Three additional themed channels made their debut in March 2001: Showtime Family Zone (which carries films intended for family audiences), Showtime Next (a channel featuring films and series that appeal toward adults between the ages of 18 and 34 years old) and Showtime Women (a channel featuring films, specials, and Showtime original programs that appeal toward a female audience). The programming format of Showtime 3 was overhauled five months later on July 1, 2001, to focus on theatrical film releases and Showtime's original made-for-cable films, that under the new name Showcase.

Showtime Family Zone, Showtime Next and Showtime Women do not have distribution by most pay-TV providers as extensive as the other Showtime multiplex channels. The availability of either of the three channels on cable providers varies depending on the market; Dish Network only carries Showtime Family Zone, and DirecTV carries Showtime Next and Showtime Family Zone, but not Showtime Women.

=== List of Showtime channels ===
Depending on the service provider, Paramount+ with Showtime provides up to sixteen multiplex channels–eight 24-hour multiplex channels, all of which are simulcast in both standard definition and high definition–as well as a video on demand service (Paramount+ with Showtime On Demand). Paramount+ with Showtime broadcasts its primary and multiplex channels on both Eastern and Pacific Time Zone schedules. The respective coastal feeds of each channel are usually packaged together (though most cable providers only offer the east and west coast feeds of the main Paramount+ with Showtime channel), resulting in the difference in local airtimes for a particular movie or program between two geographic locations being three hours at most.

Subscribers to the separate premium film service The Movie Channel, which is also owned by Paramount, do not necessarily have to subscribe to the linear Paramount+ with Showtime service in order to receive TMC; both The Movie Channel and co-owned fellow movie service Flix are typically sold together in a package (although in the case of Flix, this depends on the channel's provider availability), though DirecTV and Dish Network alternately sell TMC through a separate film tier. For unexplained reasons, live feeds of The Movie Channel and Flix have not been included alongside the other Showtime multiplex channels on its proprietary streaming services (including the Paramount+ premium tier) or its add-on tiers that are sold through live-TV streaming providers (such as Hulu, YouTube TV and DirecTV Stream), restricting their distribution to traditional cable, satellite and telco/fiber optic television providers. From 1999 to 2005, the package encompassing Showtime and its sister networks was marketed as "Showtime Unlimited"; the broader tier sometimes included the Sundance Channel (now Sundance TV) during this period, by way of the stake Showtime Networks held in the network from its 1996 inception until Sundance's 2008 purchase by Rainbow Media (now AMC Networks).

Channel	Description and programming
Paramount+ with Showtime	Paramount+ with Showtime is the flagship channel and features blockbuster movies, first-run feature films, stand-up comedy specials and documentaries. The channel also carries original series, with newer episodes primarily being shown on Sunday and Monday evenings, and since November 2023, offers original programming from the Paramount+ library. Launched on July 1, 1976, the channel was previously named Showtime until 2024.
Showtime 2	A secondary channel that offers a separate schedule of movies, original series and specials. Launched on October 1, 1991, the channel was previously named Showtime Too from 2001 to 2006.
Showtime Showcase	Similar to Showtime 2, Showcase features movies, first-run feature films and original made-for-cable films originally produced for Showtime. Launched in 1996, the channel was previously named "Showtime 3" until July 1, 2001. (This channel is not affiliated in any way with other channels using the "Showcase" name that exist in other countries, particularly those in Canada, Australia or Malaysia.)
SHO×BET	Launched in September 1999, it was formerly known as Showtime Beyond and featured a mix of sci-fi, fantasy and horror films, as well as made-for-cable science fiction series produced for Showtime. Beyond made way for SHO×BET on July 15, 2020, which focuses on programming aimed at African-American audiences and incorporating original scripted content targeted at that demographic from Showtime and BET's respective libraries, and until its merger into Paramount+ in 2026, selected previews of programming from BET+.
Showtime Extreme	Launched on March 10, 1998, Showtime Extreme airs movies in the action/adventure, thriller, and mob films, and sporting events (including mixed martial arts and boxing matches) in the past.
Showtime Family Zone	Launched in March 2001, Showtime Family Zone features family-oriented programming, including movies and specials aimed at a younger audience. All movies featured on this channel are exclusively rated G, PG, or PG-13 (or the equivalent TV-Y, TV-Y7, TV-G, TV-PG, or TV-14).
Showtime Next	Launched in March 2001, Showtime Next features movies geared towards adults between 18 and 34 years old.
Showtime Women	Launched in March 2001, Showtime Women features movies, Showtime original series and specials that are targeted towards women.

== Other services ==
=== Showtime HD ===
Showtime HD is a high definition simulcast feed of Showtime that broadcasts in the 1080i resolution format. In addition to its main channel, all of Showtime's multiplex channels also broadcast in the format, though availability of all of the HD feeds varies by provider. Showtime HD is available through virtually all providers which carry Showtime, along with Showtime's streaming services. Films shown on Showtime's HD simulcast feeds are broadcast in their domestic aspect ratio if that version is provided by the studios that maintain pay television distribution rights with the channel.

=== Showtime on Demand ===
Showtime operates a subscription video-on-demand television service called Showtime on Demand, which is available at no additional charge to Showtime subscribers. Showtime on Demand offers feature films, episodes of Showtime's original series, adult programming and sports events. Showtime on Demand's rotating program selection incorporates select new titles that are added each Friday, alongside existing program titles held over from the previous one to two weeks. The service began to be test marketed in 2001 and was officially launched in July 2002.

=== Showtime Anytime ===
On October 27, 2010, Showtime launched Showtime Anytime, a website that featured around 400 hours of streaming program content available in standard or high definition that was accessible to subscribers of the Showtime television service with TV Everywhere login. Content available on the service included Showtime original programming, feature films, comedy specials, documentaries and sports programming. It was available nationally to Showtime subscribers of satellite provider AT&T DirecTV, and regionally by Comcast Xfinity; Spectrum; Optimum; Cox Communications; CenturyLink Prism; Grande Communications; Mediacom; AT&T U-verse; and Verizon FIOS. The Showtime Anytime app (which was offered as a free download) was initially released on the iOS App Store for the iPad and iPhone on October 3, 2011. On October 1, 2012, an Android app became available through the Google Play platform for Android devices.

In September 2017, it was discovered that the Showtime Anytime website was injected with code that mined the cryptocurrency Monero using the viewer's CPU, which would potentially cause degraded performance for other websites and applications. The code was removed as soon as it was discovered.

The Anytime app and website viewing were shut down in December 2023.

=== SHO Sync ===
On September 22, 2011, Showtime launched Showtime Social, a second screen interactive app providing interactivity with Showtime programs including viewer-participant polls and trivia questions as well as real-time aggregation of Twitter, Facebook and blog comments about particular Showtime programs; the app utilizes Automated Content Recognition technology to generate interactive content regardless of whether it is being watched live, on-demand or by DVR; the app also displays heat maps depicting viewer reactions throughout the duration of an episode at the conclusion of the program. The app–which was renamed SHO Sync on September 13, 2012–was originally released for Apple iOS devices (iPad and iPhone), with an app for LG-manufactured Smart TVs being released on August 15, 2013.

On July 9, 2015, Showtime announced it would discontinue SHO Sync, immediately discontinuing support of the iPad app with the iPhone and LG apps to be discontinued at a later date. However, the channel hinted that the core interactive functions of SHO Sync may be restored in a different form, with the possibility of being incorporated into Showtime Anytime and the Showtime over-the-top streaming service.

=== Streaming service ===
On June 3, 2015, then-Showtime parent CBS Corporation announced that it would launch an over-the-top subscription video on demand service that would be distributed as a standalone offering without the requirement of having an existing television subscription to use (in the manner of competitor HBO's OTT offering, HBO Now). The service, which used the same branding as the linear television channel, was officially launched on July 7, 2015 (coinciding with the season premieres of Ray Donovan and Masters of Sex on July 12). The service was initially available for purchase through Apple Inc. (to Apple TV and iOS devices), Hulu, Roku, PlayStation Vue, and Amazon Prime as well as through Showtime's website (SHO.com).

The Showtime streaming service was identical to Showtime Anytime; it offered a back catalog of episodes of various past and present Showtime original series (with new episodes of Showtime original series being made available for streaming the same day as their original broadcast on the main linear Showtime channel), feature films and documentaries, and sports events and analysis programs. Subscriptions were also available over Amazon Prime (Amazon Channels), Hulu, The Roku Channel, and Apple TV (Apple TV Channels) as add-ons. Unlike HBO Now, Showtime also provided live streams of the East and West Coast television feeds of the linear Showtime channel (live streams of Showtime's multiplex services, and sister networks The Movie Channel, The Movie Channel Xtra, and Flix were not available on the service; live streams of Showtime's multiplex channels were available for Amazon Prime users as part of the Showtime add-on subscription).

==== Absorption into Paramount+ ====
The Showtime streaming service co-existed with Paramount Global's flagship streaming service Paramount+, and became part of a bundle offer with the service. In August 2022, the Paramount+ apps were updated with the ability to upgrade a subscription to the "Paramount+ with Showtime" bundle, and for subscribers to the bundle to access Showtime content from within the Paramount+ apps. Showtime would continue to be offered as a standalone service and application. However, in September, the company was in talks of moving the entire Showtime content within Paramount+. By December 2022, Paramount CEO Bob Bakish said that it "didn't make sense to run Showtime as a 100% stand-alone organization".

On January 30, 2023, Paramount Global confirmed the two services would be fully merged in the near future in the United States, with both the Showtime service and the current Paramount+ Premium tier to be rebranded "Paramount+ with Showtime", echoing similar integrations in other international markets. The "Showtime" brand will remain active as a distinct programming imprint. On May 20, 2023, Paramount Global announced that the merger of both services would take place on June 27, with the standalone Showtime app being shut down on April 30, 2024. The primary Showtime channel was rebranded as Paramount+ with Showtime on January 8, 2024, although the former name remains in use as a standalone brand for its multiplex channels.

On June 23, 2025, the "Paramount+ with Showtime" tier rebrand reverted to "Paramount+ Premium", similar to "Max" reverting to HBO Max on July 9.

== Programming ==
Paramount+ with Showtime's programming schedule currently consists largely of theatrically released feature films—which occupy much of the service's daily schedule, varying in quantity depending on channel—and original series targeted at adult audiences (including, as of June 2020, dramas such as Shameless, Homeland, Yellowjackets, Billions, The Chi, The L Word: Generation Q, and Penny Dreadful: City of Angels; comedies such as Black Monday, Our Cartoon President and Kidding; and docuseries including The Circus and Vice). In addition, Showtime has documentary films, boxing matches, sports-centric magazine series, occasional original stand-up comedy specials, and short-form behind-the-scenes specials centered mainly on theatrical films (either running in their initial theatrical or Showtime Networks broadcast window).

Since the early 1980s, Showtime has run an adult-oriented late night programming block on its main channel called "Showtime After Hours" (which was briefly branded as "Showtime Late Night" during the mid-1990s) each night after 12:00 a.m. Eastern Time; programs featured within the block include feature films, series produced specifically for broadcast during the block and occasional stand-up comedy specials. Softcore erotica programming has previously aired during the "After Hours" block, though adult films have been absent from Showtime's primary channel since the mid-2000s; the network began broadcasting a limited amount of original erotica series (such as Beach Heat: Miami) on its main channel in 2010, after having been removed for most of the previous decade. The network's multiplex channels Showtime 2 and Showtime Extreme also occasionally feature adult films during the overnight hours, though this has become less commonplace since late 2011.

Until the formation of Showtime Family Zone in 2001, Showtime heavily incorporated programming (both American and foreign) aimed at children and teenagers as part of its daytime schedule; in particular, the main channel ran a late afternoon block of teen-oriented series on Sundays (such as Ready or Not, Chris Cross and Degrassi High), as well as a morning block of shows aimed at younger children (such as OWL/TV, A Bunch of Munsch and The Busy World of Richard Scarry) during the early and mid-1990s, and a weekday mid-afternoon and Sunday morning film block called "Showtime Familytime" that ran during the 1980s and 1990s.

The main Showtime network also carried, unusually for a premium channel, news programming; the now-defunct All News Channel (partially owned by Viacom) produced 90-second long news updates that aired during Showtime's primetime promotional breaks in the early 1990s (ANC also produced news updates for fellow Viacom network VH1), in part as a response to the first Gulf War.

=== Original programming ===
Showtime has become known in recent years for the network's original television programs, the most popular of which include the crime drama Dexter, the dark comedy drama Weeds, family dramas Ray Donovan and Shameless and the drama/thriller series Homeland. Other notable past and present original series include Stargate SG-1 (which ran on Showtime for its first five seasons, before moving to the Sci-Fi Channel (now Syfy) for the remainder of its run); Dead Like Me; Californication; Gigolos; Nurse Jackie; The Tudors; Brotherhood; Soul Food; Queer as Folk; The L Word; The Big C; Penn & Teller: Bullshit!; and United States of Tara. In mid-2017, the channel aired the critically acclaimed third season of David Lynch's TV series Twin Peaks. From 2007 to 2013, multiplex service Showtime 2 broadcast an original program exclusive to that channel, the seasonal late night reality series Big Brother: After Dark, a companion to sister broadcast network CBS' American adaptation of Big Brother; the program moved to TVGN (which has since been renamed Pop) starting with the June 26, 2013, premiere of Big Brother's 15th season.

Showtime formerly produced its own original made-for-cable movies, originally branded as "Showtime Original Movies" until 1994 and "Showtime Original Pictures" thereafter until the channel largely discontinued producing television films beginning in 2007. In 1989, Showtime begin supplying movies from the in-house unit, Viacom Pictures, which was absorbed into Showtime Entertainment Group in 1992. Showtime is also one of only two premium cable services (alongside Disney Channel during its existence as a premium channel prior to 1997) that has produced original movies aimed at family audiences; these films were originally broadcast under the separate banner "Showtime Original Pictures for Kids" from 1995 to 1997 and "Showtime Original Pictures for All Ages" from 1997 to 2005.

==== Showtime After Hours ====
A signature feature of Showtime was a late-night block known as Showtime After Hours, which featured softcore pornographic films and original series. Showtime did not have set start or end times for the block, as they varied depending on the mainstream feature films–and original series on certain nights–that aired prior to and following it, and also depended on the number of programs and programs in particular that were scheduled to air within the block. Programs that aired under the Showtime After Hours banner carried either a TV-MA or R rating (usually the former), primarily for strong sexual content and nudity. The block had often been the subject of both scrutiny in the media and a source of humor in popular culture, with references to late night programming like Showtime's being featured in various films and television shows.

=== Movie library ===
As of 2026, Showtime–and sister channels The Movie Channel and Flix–maintains exclusive first-run film licensing agreements with Saban Films and Bleecker Street.

Despite being corporately reunited with Paramount Pictures in 2019 as a result of the ViacomCBS merger, Paramount maintained an existing output deal with MGM+ (formerly Epix, which Paramount co-owned with Lionsgate and MGM from its 2009 launch until 2018) until the end of 2025. The most recent Paramount films are not airing on any linear television network as of September 2026. Showtime subscribers though certain providers are able to stream certain recent Paramount Pictures films through included Paramount+ subscriptions.

Showtime also shows sub-runs – runs of films that have already received broadcast or syndicated television airings – of theatrical films distributed by IFC Films, Sony Pictures (including content from Columbia Pictures, TriStar Pictures, Screen Gems, Revolution Studios and Morgan Creek Productions), Warner Bros. Entertainment (including content from New Line Cinema), Universal Pictures (including content from subsidiary Focus Features), Open Road Films, Screen Media, Oscilloscope (select films), Summit Entertainment (for films released prior to 2013), A24 (for films released prior to 2024), Amblin Partners (including releases produced in conjunction with DreamWorks Pictures and Participant), Amazon MGM Studios (including content from subsidiary United Artists) (for films released prior to 2015), Lionsgate (for films released prior to 2015), Walt Disney Studios (including content from 20th Century Studios, Walt Disney Pictures, and Marvel Studios), and Miramax (including films from former subsidiary Dimension Films).

The window between a film's initial release in theaters and its initial screening on Showtime and sister channels The Movie Channel and Flix is wider than the grace period leading to a film's initial broadcast on HBO/Cinemax, Starz/Encore (formerly owned by Lionsgate), and Epix. Films that Showtime has pay cable rights to will usually run on The Movie Channel and Flix during the period of its term of licensing.

==== Former first-run contracts ====
Within years of its launch, Showtime entered into licensing agreements with several movie studios. Following Viacom's 1983 acquisition of a joint stake in The Movie Channel, Paramount Pictures (then owned by Gulf+Western) signed a five-year exclusive first-run distribution agreement with Showtime and The Movie Channel to carry the studio's films through 1989. On July 15, 1987, HBO signed a five-year deal with Paramount Pictures to broadcast 85 of their films released from May 1988 onward; in May 1989, after it signed a licensing deal with HBO, Paramount Pictures filed a lawsuit against Showtime Networks, Viacom and its parent National Amusements over Showtime's alleged refusal to pay a total of $88 million in fees for five films (that underperformed in their theatrical release) to reduce the minimum liability for its 75-film package from Paramount. After Paramount Pictures was purchased by Viacom in 1994, Showtime (which was also owned by Viacom at the time) signed a seven-year distribution deal with Paramount which took effect in January 1998, following the expiration of Paramount Pictures' contract with HBO.

In 1986, Showtime signed an agreement with Buena Vista Motion Pictures Group; its contract with Walt Disney Pictures expired after 1992, while output deals with Touchstone Pictures and Hollywood Pictures expired after 1996. Rival pay channel Starz signed a deal with Disney in 1994, carrying only Touchstone Pictures and Hollywood Pictures films released from January 1997 onward early on. Also in 1986, Showtime signed an agreement with Orion Pictures for an exclusive first-run film output deal, that coincides with owner Viacom purchasing a minority stake in Showtime. By 1989, Showtime had already made exclusive deals with Carolco Pictures (signed in 1988), Atlantic Entertainment Group, Cannon Films (both signed in 1986), Universal Pictures, De Laurentiis Entertainment Group, Imagine Entertainment (signed in 1986), and Weintraub Films.

On April 13, 1990, Showtime signed an exclusive first-run film output deal with New Line Cinema; in July 1993, Encore signed an output deal with New Line Cinema, broadcasting its films released between 1994 and 2004. On November 22, 1993, Showtime signed exclusive first-run premium cable rights with Metro-Goldwyn-Mayer (renewing an existing pact with the studio) and United Artists, which were renewed for nine additional years in 2000. On March 5, 1996, Showtime announced a seven-year output deal with Phoenix Pictures (as part of an agreement that also included the purchase of an 11% equity interest), broadcasting titles from that studio released between 1996 and 2002. During that time, Showtime also maintained output deals with TriStar Pictures (between 1989 and 1999, non-exclusive until 1990), Dimension Films (between 1997 and 2003), Castle Rock Entertainment (which expired after 1999), PolyGram Filmed Entertainment (which expired after 2001), and Artisan Entertainment (later Lionsgate, which expired after 2008). In 2006, Showtime entered into a partial deal with Rogue Pictures to broadcast select films released by the studio (especially those originally produced for home video release).

On December 4, 2008, Showtime signed a four-year exclusive first-run distribution deal with Summit Entertainment, broadcasting 42 films that were released by that studio between 2009 and 2012. On May 27, 2011, rival premium channel HBO had signed an output deal with Summit Entertainment, allowing films that were released between 2013 and 2017 to be broadcast on HBO. Showtime formerly had a deal with The Weinstein Company (since 2009, including releases by Dimension Films). Netflix assumed the rights to The Weinstein Company's films starting in 2016.

==== Paramount Pictures, Lionsgate, and MGM ====
The future of Showtime was put into question after negotiations to renew film output deals with Paramount Pictures (which was separated from Showtime following the December 2005 split of Viacom and CBS into two separate companies, with CBS Corporation taking ownership of Showtime; the companies would however re-merge 14 years later), Metro-Goldwyn-Mayer, and Lions Gate Entertainment broke down, due to the failure between the studios and Showtime to agree on licensing fees for movies from the channel's three largest film distributors. All three studios then entered into a joint venture, Studio 3 Partners, to form Epix as a competitor to Showtime, HBO and Starz; Epix debuted in May 2009 as a broadband Internet service, with the television channel launching on October 30 of that year.

==== A24 ====
From November 13, 2019 to December 31, 2023, Showtime was the exclusive premium cable broadcaster for films distributed by A24 (excluding titles part of A24's already-existing partnership with Apple Inc.) through an output deal made between the two entities.

=== Sports programming ===
Showtime has broadcast a limited amount of sports programming, which was historically produced by the channel's Showtime Sports division. Showtime also operates Showtime Sports PPV (formerly Showtime Event Television or SET), which formerly broadcast boxing matches and has broadcast other select event programming for pay-per-view. Beginning in March 1986, Showtime's sports programming consisted largely of boxing matches produced under the banner Showtime Championship Boxing; in 2001, the network launched ShoBox: The New Generation, focusing primarily on up-and-coming boxers. In 2004, Showtime began broadcasting all domestic fights telecast on the channel in high definition.

In December 2006, Showtime announced a deal to broadcast mixed martial arts matches from the then-newly formed Elite Xtreme Combat (or EliteXC), an MMA organization formed by Showtime Networks and ProElite, Inc., with all events broadcast under the banner ShoXC; the league folded two years later in 2008.

In 2008, Showtime acquired Inside the NFL, the longest-running program in the history of HBO, from HBO after it had cancelled the seasonal analysis and interview program in February of that year; Inside the NFL moved to Showtime that September. In 2021, Inside the NFL moved to Paramount+.

In February 2009, mixed martial arts promotion Strikeforce announced a three-year broadcast agreement with Showtime, allowing it to broadcast up to 16 events per year, as well as a deal with sister network CBS for an option to produce up to four events for that network; Strikeforce ended its run on Showtime when the league folded in January 2013. In addition to broadcasting big-ticket Strikeforce events on Showtime, the promotion also announced it would produce ShoMMA: Strikeforce Challengers, an event series highlighting up-and-coming fighters.

In 2010, Showtime debuted another original sports insider program, Inside NASCAR, focusing on interviews and analysis from around the NASCAR circuit. In 2011, Showtime expanded its MMA programming by televising events produced by M-1 Global, the Russian PTC company of popular Strikeforce fighter Fedor Emelianenko. In November 2012, Showtime debuted a sports-themed spinoff of CBS' long-running newsmagazine 60 Minutes, titled 60 Minutes Sports.

From 2012 to 2015, Showtime also aired an hour-long program called Jim Rome on Showtime, featuring the CBS Sports Radio host's commentary and interviews with personalities in the sports world.

On February 9, 2021, it was announced that Showtime would be the exclusive home of Bellator MMA beginning with Bellator 255 on April 2 (the ViacomCBS merger made Bellator and Showtime corporate siblings). It was the first time mixed martial arts aired on Showtime since Strikeforce was absorbed by the UFC.

Showtime Sports ceased operations on December 31, 2023, and sports programming has been moved to the CBS Sports branding.

== International ==
Outside of the United States, several pay television networks have used the Showtime name and former logo through licensing agreements with Showtime Networks for a while such as Showtime Australia, Showtime Arabia, Showtime Scandinavia and Spain's Showtime Extreme (now XTRM). Showtime launched a South African version as part of the new TopTV satellite provider's package on May 1, 2010.

In January 2015, CBS announced an exclusive Canadian brand and content licensing agreement with domestic broadcaster Bell Media, under which Showtime programming would air exclusively on Bell's services including The Movie Network and CraveTV (later consolidated under the Crave name); prior to this, The Movie Network and now-defunct counterpart Movie Central had been licensing Canadian rights to current Showtime programming. Later that year, Chinese streamer PPTV agreed to a multi-year license to stream CBS and Showtime series in the country, giving 400 million users access to select Showtime series from CBS.

Showtime programming is also distributed in selected countries/territories through localized versions of Paramount+, including Australia, Latin America, UK and Ireland.

=== SkyShowtime ===
SkyShowtime logo

SkyShowtime is a joint-venture between Skydance's Showtime and Comcast's Sky which combines programming from the corporations' Paramount+ and Peacock services. SkyShowtime launched in European markets where Sky does not operate their satellite and cable services.
