= Showtime Networks =

American entertainment company

Showtime Networks, Inc.
- Formerly: Showtime/The Movie Channel, Inc. (1983–1988)
- Type: Subsidiary
- Industry: Entertainment
- Predecessor: Warner-Amex Satellite Entertainment
- Founded: September 6, 1983; 43 years ago
- Founder: Viacom; Warner-Amex Satellite Entertainment
- Headquarters: New York City, United States
- Key people: Laurel Weir (president/CEO); Nina Diaz (CCO); Keyes Hill-Edgar (COO)
- Products: Pay television; Television production
- Brands: Paramount+ with Showtime; The Movie Channel; Flix
- Revenue: $1 billion (2021)
- Number of employees: 1,000
- Parent: Viacom (1983–2005); CBS Corporation (2005–2019); Skydance Global Cable Media (2019–present)
- Website: paramountpluswithshowtime.com

Showtime Networks, Inc. is a subsidiary of American media conglomerate Skydance under its networks division that oversees the company's premium cable television channels, including its flagship namesake service. It was founded on September 6, 1983.

== Overview ==
The company was established in 1983 as Showtime/The Movie Channel, Inc. after Viacom and Warner-Amex Satellite Entertainment (now Paramount Media Networks) merged their premium channels, Showtime and The Movie Channel respectively, into one division. In 1984, American Express sold their interest in Warner-Amex to Warner Communications (now Warner Bros. Discovery) making Warner the new half-owner of Showtime/TMC. In 1985, Warner sold its half-interest to Viacom, making the company a wholly owned subsidiary of Viacom. The acquisition was completed on May 20, 1986, along with MTV Networks. It also saw the pay-per-view service Viewer's Choice become part of the operation; it merged with rival PPV service Home Premiere Television in 1988, and Viacom ceded control to the cable companies that owned HPT (Viacom still held a stake until the 1990s). In 1988, the company was renamed Showtime Networks, Inc.

On March 1, 1994, a partnership between Showtime Networks and Home Box Office, Inc. (parent of HBO and Cinemax) implemented a cooperative content advisory system that was initially unveiled across Showtime, The Movie Channel and the HBO properties that would provide specific content information for pay-cable subscribers to determine the suitability of a program for children. The development of the system—inspired by the advisory ratings featured in Showtime and The Movie Channel's respective program guides and those distributed by other participating premium cable services—was in response to concerns from parents and advocacy groups about violent content on television, allowing the Showtime Networks and other services to assign individual ratings corresponding to the objectionable content depicted in specific programs (and categorized based on violence, profanity, sexuality or miscellaneous mature material). Labels are assigned to each program at the discretion of the participating service. A revised system—centered around ten content codes of two to three letters in length—was implemented across the Showtime Networks and Home Box Office services on June 10, 1994.

Showtime Networks became part of CBS Corporation when it officially split from Viacom on December 31, 2005. Showtime Networks managed Sundance Channel as part of a joint venture with Robert Redford and NBC Universal until 2008, when it was sold to Rainbow Media (now AMC Networks). CBS Corporation re-merged with Viacom to form ViacomCBS (later Paramount Global and now Paramount Skydance) in early December 2019.

In February 2023 when Showtime Networks' parent Paramount Global integrated Showtime's streaming platforms into Paramount+, Showtime Networks had merged its production operations and its unit Showtime Studios alongside its leadership team into Paramount's fellow production arm MTV Entertainment Studios forming a combined entity renaming the latter to Showtime/MTV Entertainment Studios with Nina L. Diaz President of Content and CCO of the combined entitly became Head of Scripted at the merged production unit under the Showtime Studios name whilst Amy Israel continued leading Showtime Networks as executive VP of scripted.

== Cable networks currently owned by SNI ==
Year in parentheses denotes when each network and channel was brought into the SNI fold.

- Paramount+ with Showtime (1983)^{+}
  - SHO2 (formerly SHOTOO) (1991)
  - Showcase (formerly Showtime 3) (1996)
  - Showtime Extreme (1998)
  - SHO×BET (2020)^{*}
  - Showtime Next (2001)
  - Showtime Family Zone (2001)
  - Showtime Women (2001)
- The Movie Channel (1983)^{+}
  - The Movie Channel Xtra (1997)
- Flix (1992)

^{+}Channel launched under Warner-Amex Satellite Entertainment prior to 1983.
^{*}Channel originally named Showtime Beyond from 1999 to 2020.

SNI won a Peabody Award in 2002 for Bang Bang You're Dead. In 2008, SNI was honored at the 59th Annual Technology & Engineering Emmy Awards for Outstanding Achievement in Advanced Media Technology for Best Use of Commercial Advertising on Personal Computer for the companion website to the series The L Word.
