= 1st International Emmy Awards =

1973 awards ceremony

- Date: November 19, 1973
- Location: Plaza Hotel, New York City

The 1st International Emmy Awards took place on November 19, 1973, at the Plaza Hotel in New York City. The award ceremony, presented by the International Academy of Television Arts and Sciences, honors all programming produced and originally aired outside the United States.

== Ceremony ==
The International Emmy Award was created by the International Council of the National Academy of Television Arts and Sciences (currently International Academy of Television Arts and Sciences) in 1973. The first awards ceremony was attended by Herbert S. Schlosser president of NBC, John Cannon vice chairman of the National Academy of Television Arts and Sciences, Hartford S. Gunn president of the Public Broadcasting Service, John A. Schneider president of CBS, David Webster Director of BBC, Charles Curran Director General of the BBC and president of the European Broadcasting Union, Antonio Mercero and Joaquim Bordiu directors of Televisión Española, Walter A. Schwartz, president of ABC and Ralph Baruch, president of Viacom International. The American TV executives were there as presenters of awards.

Mr. Curran was the first person to receive the Directorate Award. Mr. Webster won the best documentary award for the BBC by Horizon. The Televisión Española for the dramatic play La Cabina ("The Telephone Booth").

== Winners ==
- Best Popular Arts Program: La cabina (tve)
- Best Documentary: Horizon (BBC)
- Directorate Award: Charles Curran (Director-General of the BBC)
