= Flix (TV network) =

American movie-oriented pay television network

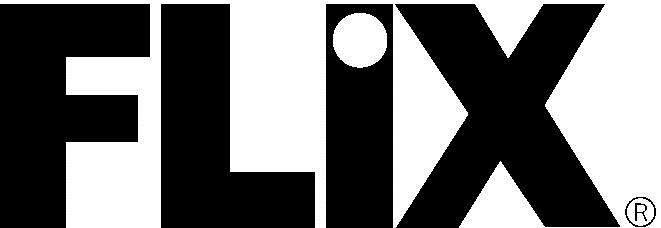
- Country: United States
- Broadcast area: Nationwide
- Headquarters: New York City

Programming
- Languages: English; Spanish (via SAP audio track; some films may be broadcast in their native language and subtitled into English)
- Picture format: 480i (SDTV); 1080i (HDTV)

Ownership
- Owner: Skydance Global Cable Media (Skydance)
- Parent: Showtime Networks
- Key people: Chris McCarthy (Chairman/CEO, Showtime Networks); Michael Crotty (EVP/CFO, Showtime Networks); Tom Christie (COO, Showtime Networks)
- Sister channels: list of assets owned by Skydance

History
- Launched: August 1, 1992; 34 years ago

Availability

Streaming media
- Affiliated streaming service: Paramount+

Flix (stylized as FLiX) is an American premium cable and satellite television network owned by Showtime Networks, a subsidiary of Skydance operated through its Skydance Global Cable Media division. Its programming consists solely of theatrically released motion pictures released from the 1970s to the present day, interspersed with some films from the 1950s and 1960s.

It is the only premium television service in the United States that does not operate any multiplex channels that provide additional programming alongside the main service. Although Flix is typically offered as part of the Showtime multiplex, the channel's carriage varies depending on both the cable provider and market, therefore it may not be available alongside Showtime and The Movie Channel's multiplex services in all areas. Although one or both of the channels have traditionally been carried alongside the Showtime multiplex on cable and satellite providers, as of 2018, Flix as well as The Movie Channel are not presently carried by any of the over-the-top subscription television services – Hulu Live TV, Sling TV, YouTube TV and DirecTV Now – that carry most or all of the eight Showtime multiplex channels.

In recent years, Flix has lost carriage with the growth of streaming alternatives including its parent company's Paramount+, and has generally been depreciated by Skydance in current retransmission consent negotiations with cable and streaming providers.

== History ==
The network launched on August 1, 1992, as a single-channel "mini-pay" service. Flix originally featured movies from the 1960s to the 1980s, although it would gradually begin to scatter some 1990s film titles onto the network's schedule over time. At its launch, Flix had been one of the last premium channels to restrict the broadcast of R-rated films to the nighttime hours. A notable aspect of Flix during its early days was that the channel did not solely advertise the channel's own prime time lineup, but also ran "Premium Tonight" interstitials which listed programs slated to air that evening on competing major U.S. premium channels HBO and Cinemax as well as sister networks Showtime, The Movie Channel, and Sundance Channel – during breaks between daytime movies (since 2002, Showtime has been the only other premium service that the network has provided prime time listings during its prime time lineup segment).

Three years prior to the channel's launch, in 1989, Tele-Communications Inc. made a failed bid to acquire a 50% ownership stake in Showtime from Viacom. There was some debate as to whether Viacom or TCI originally conceived the idea for Encore, another (one-time) "mini-pay" service that was originally similar in format to Flix, which also focused on films from the 1960s to the 1980s until a format change in 1999 in which that channel added more recent films to its schedule. Viacom executives insisted that TCI lifted part of the idea for Encore from the company's Showtime Networks division. John Sie, the president of Encore at the time, said in a 1991 interview with Multichannel News that TCI brought up the concept of the Encore network as a way to revitalize Showtime, either by launching a new tertiary service from scratch or by overhauling the format of Showtime's existing sister network The Movie Channel.

On June 14, 2005, Viacom decided to separate itself into two companies (only six years after the company's acquisition of CBS), both of which would be controlled by Viacom parent National Amusements, amid stagnation of the company's stock price. The original Viacom was restructured as CBS Corporation and acquired Showtime Networks along with CBS' broadcasting assets, Paramount Television (now the separate arms CBS Television Studios for network and cable production, and CBS Television Distribution for production of first-run syndicated programs and off-network series distribution), advertising firm Viacom Outdoor (renamed CBS Outdoor), Simon & Schuster and Paramount Parks (which was later sold); the new Viacom kept Paramount Pictures, the MTV Networks and BET Networks cable divisions, and Famous Music (the latter was sold off in 2007).

In 2007, Flix began to broadcast certain R-rated movies during daytime timeslots. That same year, Flix began to air movies released in 2000, including such titles as Reindeer Games and Pitch Black; other films released during the 2000s have been added to the network's schedule since then.

On August 13, 2019, National Amusements officially announced that CBS and Viacom would re-merge into a new entity known as ViacomCBS, to be headed by Viacom CEO Bob Bakish as the new company's president and CEO, while National Amusements CEO Shari Redstone would serve as chairperson. On October 29, 2019, National Amusements approved the re-merger deal; it closed on December 4, 2019. As part of the new structure, the Showtime Networks unit and its assets—Showtime, The Movie Channel and Flix—became part of the Premium Content Group division of Paramount Media Networks, along with BET and temporarily Pop TV (which was transferred to the Youth & Entertainment Group division the following month), to be overseen by SNI CEO David Nevins.

== Related services ==
=== Flix On Demand ===
Flix On Demand.

Flix On Demand is the channel's subscription video-on-demand service; it is available to subscribers who receive the channel along with the other Showtime multiplex channels, though a few cable systems carry it as a free service that does not require a subscription as an inducement for customers to subscribe to the full Showtime suite of channels. Launched in 2005, Flix On Demand offers classic movies released between the 1950s and the 1990s, which are divided by category based on the decade of their release: 1950s and 1960s, 1970s, 1980s and 1990s.

== Programming ==
=== Movie library ===
As of April 2023, Flix – through Showtime – maintains exclusive first-run film licensing agreements with Amblin Partners, IFC Films, A24, and Bleecker Street.

Flix also shows sub-runs – runs of films that have already received broadcast or syndicated television airings – of theatrical films distributed by Sony Pictures Releasing (all divisions, and including content from Revolution Studios and Morgan Creek Productions), Warner Bros. Entertainment (including content from New Line Cinema), Universal Pictures (including content from subsidiary Focus Features), Open Road Films, Screen Media, Oscilloscope, Summit Entertainment (for films released prior to 2013), Paramount Pictures (for films released prior to 2017, and including content from MTV Films and Nickelodeon Movies), Amazon MGM Studios (including content from subsidiaries United Artists and Orion Pictures), Lionsgate (sub-run rights with the latter two studios are for films released prior to 2009), and Walt Disney Studios (including content from Disney, 20th Century Studios, and Miramax (a subsidiary of Disney) from 1993 to 2010).

Many lesser-known film titles (particularly those released as independent films) that have either not received a theatrical release or were released on DVD or home video are also commonly broadcast on Flix. The window between a film's initial release in theaters and its initial screening on Showtime, The Movie Channel and Flix is wider than the grace period leading to a film's initial broadcast on HBO, Cinemax or Starz. Films that Showtime has pay cable rights to will usually also run on Flix and The Movie Channel during the period of its term of licensing.

== Branding ==
=== Network slogans ===
- 1992–1997: "Movies You Grew Up With"
- 1997–2007: "Cool Classics. For the Movie Generation"
- 1997–2007: "For the Movie Generation"
- 2007–present: "Cool Classics."
