= La cabina =

- Genre: Telefilm
- Written by: Antonio Mercero; José Luis Garci
- Directed by: Antonio Mercero
- Starring: José Luis López Vázquez
- Country of origin: Spain
- Original language: Spanish

Production
- Running time: 35 min.
- Production company: Televisión Española

Original release
- Network: TVE1
- Release: December 13, 1972

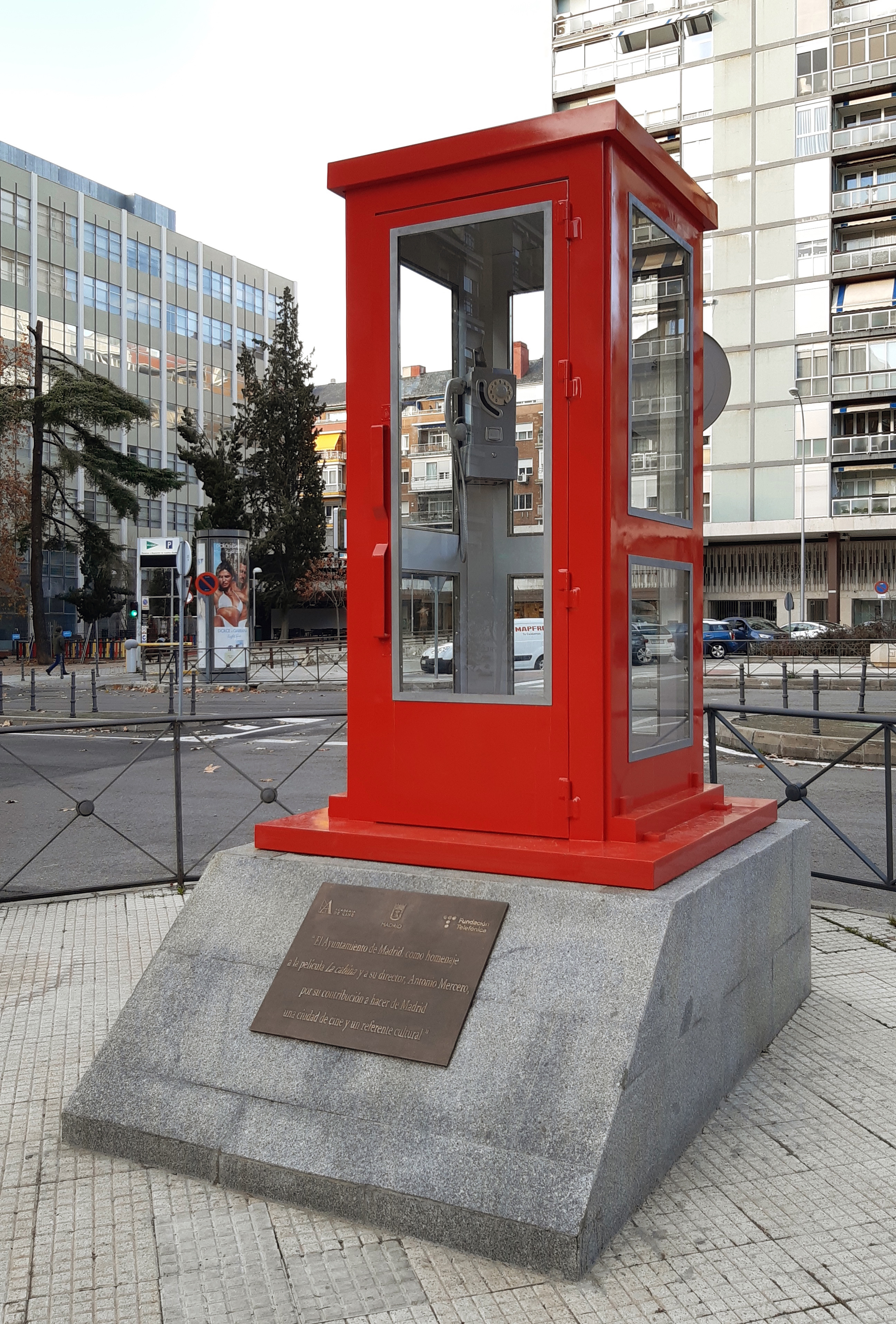
In December 2021 a replica of the red phone booth was inaugurated as a tribute to the film and its director Antonio Mercero near its filming location in Madrid.

La cabina (English: The Telephone Box) is a 1972 Spanish television film directed by Antonio Mercero, and written by himself and José Luis Garci, starring José Luis López Vázquez. It first aired on 13 December 1972 on Televisión Española. In the 35-minute film, a man becomes trapped in a telephone booth, while passersby seem unable to help him.

The film won the 1973 International Emmy Award for Fiction, the only Spanish programme to have won it. It was uploaded on YouTube in August 2019 by RTVE Archivo.

== Plot ==
The film opens with workmen installing a phone booth in the middle of a square. Later, a man takes his son to the school bus. He enters the phone booth to make a call, and the door slowly closes behind him. The man realizes that the phone does not work, so he tries to leave, only to discover that the door is stuck. He tries desperately to get it open, but nothing works.

Eventually, two businessmen come by and try to help him out, but to no avail. This gathers the attention of many passers-by, who begin to congregate and watch the action. Several people (including a strong man, a repair man and a police officer) try to open the door, but it remains stuck. Eventually, as a firefighter is about to try to break the glass roof of the phone booth, workers from the phone booth company appears. They unbolt the booth and take it away on their truck, with the man still inside it. The crowd cheers and waves him away.

The man watches frantically as he is carted across town. He tries to scream for help from people but everyone, apart from some dwarves, just smile and wave. There are allusions to his fate along the way, with a dwarf holding a ship in a bottle and a glass coffin containing a corpse being mourned. Eventually the truck stops next to another truck also carrying a man stuck in a phone booth. The two men try to communicate, but cannot. After many hours, the truck arrives at a massive underground warehouse. The phone booth is lifted into the air by a giant magnet and the truck drives away. The phone booth is carried by a forklift through the warehouse, which is full of phone booths containing decaying remains of other trapped citizens. The man struggles in fear but cannot escape. The forklift drops him and leaves. The man looks to his right and sees the trapped man he saw on his way to the warehouse, who has strangled himself with the telephone cord. In other booths lie corpses in various states of decay. The man collapses out of frame in despair. The film ends with the phone booth company setting up a similar booth in the same park.
