= 2nd International Emmy Awards =

1974 awards ceremony

- Date: November 25, 1974
- Location: Plaza Hotel, New York City

The 2nd International Emmy Awards took place on November 25, 1974, at the Plaza Hotel in New York City, New York. The award ceremony, presented by the International Academy of Television Arts and Sciences, honors all programming produced and originally aired outside the United States.

== Ceremony ==
The first ceremonies of the International Emmy Awards, had only two categories, Fiction and Non-fiction, and were won in most part by United Kingdom productions and Canada. Over the following years, new categories were added in the competition, covering a larger number of competitors from different countries.

== Winners ==
- Directorate Award - Joseph V. Charyk (won)
