= John A. Schneider =

American television executive (1926–2019)

John A. ("Jack") Schneider (December 4, 1926 - December 10, 2019 in Stamford, CT) was a former president of the CBS Television Network from 1965-1976, and from 1979 until 1984, the first president of Warner Amex Satellite Entertainment, the company that created MTV.

== Career ==
Schneider joined CBS in Chicago in 1950 and was working in national advertising sales when the network in 1958 bought WCAU-TV in Philadelphia, Pennsylvania. Schneider was named general manager of the station, serving until October 1964, when he was named general manager of WCBS-TV in New York City.

On February 28, 1965, Schneider was appointed president of the CBS Television Network and a vice president and board member of CBS, Inc. Schneider told The New York Times upon taking the job "I'm 38 now, but I'll be 55 next week" on the suddenness of the promotion, having no experience at the network level. Schneider next became the first president of the newly formed CBS Broadcast Group in 1966. He became an executive VP of CBS Inc. in 1969 and held that position until 1978. He was responsible for the CBS Television Network, CBS News, CBS stations, and CBS radio. CBS was the preeminent broadcast network under his tenure.

In 1977 CBS removed Schneider as president of the broadcast group; he was made a senior vice president on the corporate level, responsible for governmental, industrial and international relations. He was the original president of Warner-Amex Satellite Entertainment Company in 1979, a joint venture of Warner Communications' Warner Cable and American Express. By 1981, he oversaw the launch of MTV.

He was also awarded the IRTS (International Radio and Television Society) Gold Medal.

== Personal life ==
Schneider was born in Chicago, Illinois. The son of Arnold and Anna Schneider, following high school, he enrolled at the University of Notre Dame to study Naval Science and Tactics where he earned his B.S. degree in Naval Science in 1946. He served as an ensign in the Navy aboard the destroyer USS Hobson during World War II. After the war, he returned to Notre Dame and earned a degree in Marketing in 1948.
