= 3rd International Emmy Awards =

1975 awards ceremony

- Date: November 24, 1975
- Location: Plaza Hotel, New York City

The 3rd International Emmy Awards took place on November 24, 1975, in New York City. The award ceremony, presented by the International Academy of Television Arts and Sciences, honors all programming produced and originally aired outside the United States.

== Ceremony ==
The International Emmy Awards are given annually by the International Academy of Television Arts and Sciences. The winners include the British network BBC with two awards, the non-fiction for Marek, a drama that tells the story of a child who undergo an operation on the heart, and that due to a complication called pulmonary atresia, dies. The film talks about the courage of a family in a time of crisis. And the Popular Arts Award for The Evacuees.

During the ceremony, the Academy honored the president of Tokyo Broadcasting System, Junzo Imamichi with 1975 International Emmy Directorate Award.

== Winners ==
- Best Popular Arts Program: The Evacuees (BBC Two)
- Best Drama: Marek (BBC Two)
- Directorate Award: Junzo Imamichi (President of TBS TV)
