= 4th International Emmy Awards =

1976 awards ceremony

- Date: November 22, 1976
- Location: Plaza Hotel, New York City

The 4th International Emmy Awards took place on November 22, 1976 in New York City. The award ceremony, presented by the International Academy of Television Arts and Sciences, honors all programming produced and originally aired outside the United States.

== Ceremony ==
The 4th International Emmys ceremony took place on the night of November 22, 1976, in New York City. It was organized by the International Academy of Television Arts and Sciences (IATAS). British TV network Thames Television was awarded in the fiction category for The Naked Civil Servant, a biographical film based on the 1968 book of the same name by Quentin Crisp, starring John Hurt and directed by Jack Gold, the award was presented by the actor Telly Savalas. The non-fiction category went to Japan's Nippon TV documentary Reach for Tomorrow.

Robert T. Howard of NBC presented the Directorate Award to Talbot Duckmanton, Secretary General of the Asia-Pacific Broadcasting Union. Howard Thomas and Brazilian journalist Roberto Marinho, founder of TV Globo, were also honored during the ceremony.

== Winners ==
- Best Fiction Program: The Naked Civil Servant (Thames Television)
- Best Non-Fiction Program: Reach for Tomorrow (Nippon TV)
- Directorate Award: Talbot Duckmanton, Secretary General of the ABU
